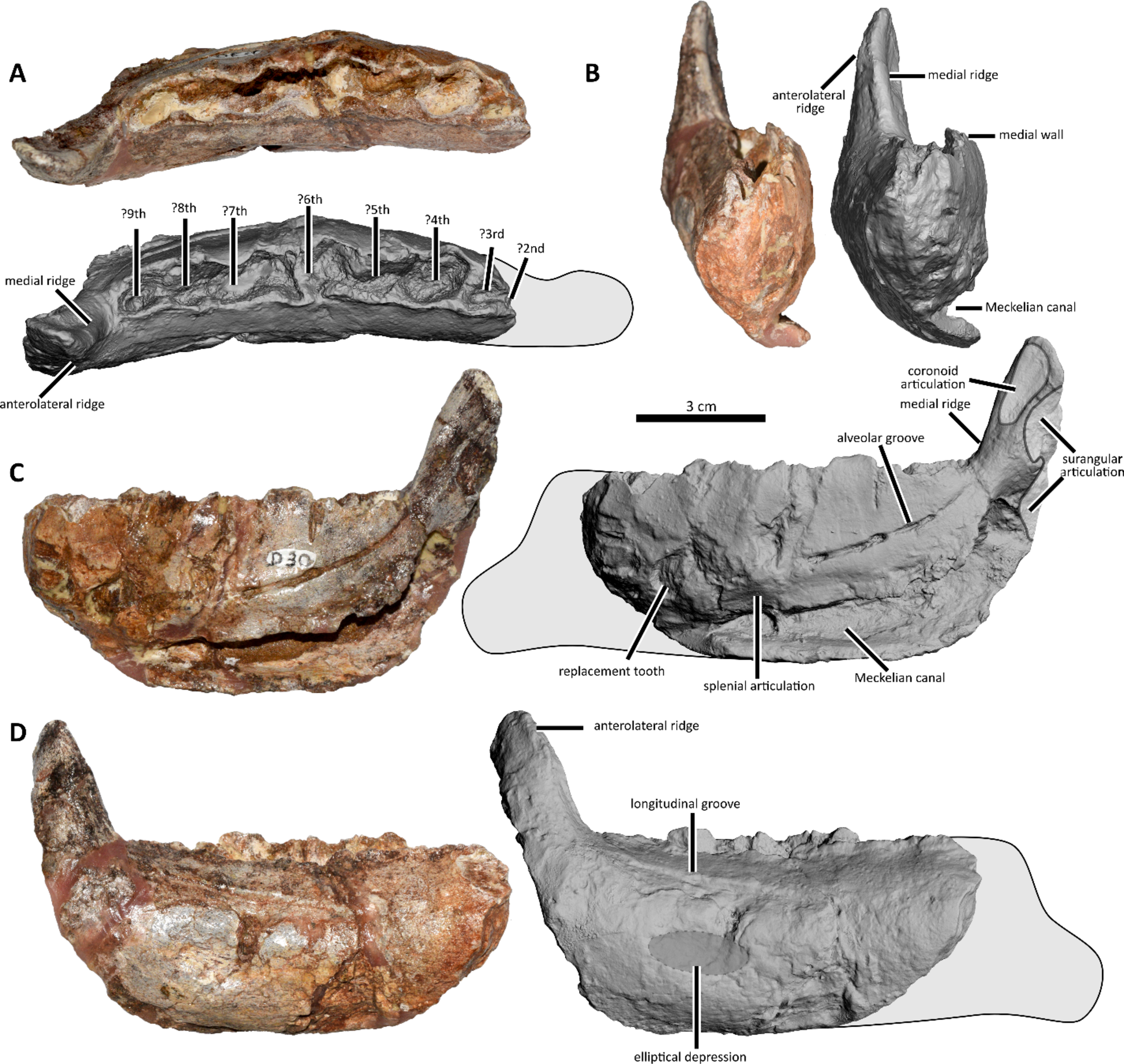
- Holotype jaw

Scientific classification
- Kingdom: Animalia
- Phylum: Chordata
- Clade: Dinosauria
- Clade: †Ornithischia
- Clade: †Ornithopoda
- Clade: †Rhabdodontomorpha
- Genus: †Obelignathus; Czepiński & Madzia, 2025

Type species
- †Rhabdodon septimanicus Buffetaut & Le Loeuff, 1991

= Obelignathus =

Obelignathus Temporal range: Late Cretaceous, upper Campanian–lower Maastrichtian

Genus of ornithopod dinosaurs

Obelignathus (meaning "Obelix jaw") is an extinct genus of rhabdodontomorph ornithopod dinosaurs from the Late Cretaceous 'Grès à Reptiles' Formation of France. The genus contains a single species, O. septimanicus, known from a right dentary. The species was initially classified as a species of the coeval Rhabdodon.

== Discovery and naming ==
The Obelignathus holotype specimen, MDE D30, was discovered in 1990 in outcrops of the 'Grès à Reptiles' Formation near Montouliers in Saint-Chinian commune of Hérault, southern France. The specimen consists of an isolated right dentary, missing the anterior (front) part.

The specimen was first described in 1991 by Éric Buffetaut and Jean Le Loeuff. Based on the general morphology and dental anatomy, they identified it as belonging to the genus Rhabdodon, named as a hypsilophodont in 1869. However, they described it as a new species, R. septimanicus due to other differing anatomical characteristics. The specific name references Septimania, a historic region of France corresponding to Languedoc, where the type locality in Montouliers is.

In 2025, Czepiński & Madzia described Obelignathus as a new genus of rhabdodontomorphs for "Rhabdodon" septimanicus based on these fossil remains. The generic name, Obelignathus, combines a reference to Obelix, a fictional character in the cartoon Asterix and Obelix, with the Greek γνάθος (gnáthos), meaning "jaw", referencing the similar strength of the character and robust morphology of the holotype dentary.

== Classification ==
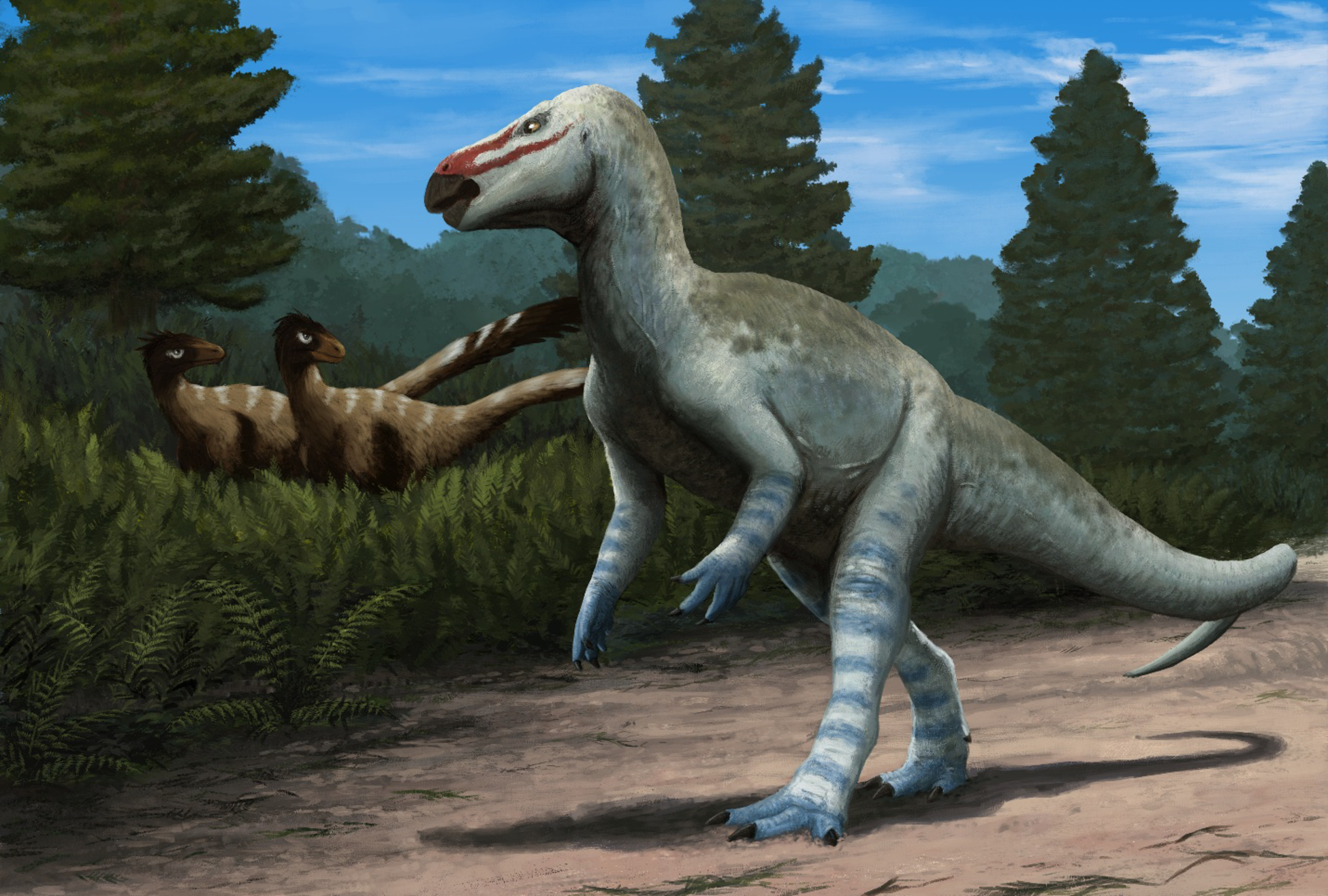
Speculative life restoration of Obelignathus and two dromaeosaurids in their environment

To determine the phylogenetic affinities of Obelignathus, Czepiński & Madzia (2025) used an updated version of the comprehensive phylogenetic dataset of Fonseca et al. (2024), who had independently recovered "Rhabdodon" septimanicus outside of the genus Rhabdodon and suggested it may represent a taxon distinct from Rhabdodon priscus.

Czepiński & Madzia included the 'Quarante rhabdodontomorph' as a separate operational taxonomic unit (OTU); the specimens comprising this OTU were referred to cf. "R." septimanicus in a doctoral thesis but have not yet been formally described. Using implied weighting and K-values of 15 and 21, the authors recovered Obelignathus as the most basal member of the Rhabdodontomorpha. These results are displayed in the cladogram below:

- Rhabdodontomorpha
  - Obelignathus
  - - Transylvanosaurus
    - 'Quarante rhabdodontomorph'
    - Ampelognathus
    - Tenontosauridae
      - Convolosaurus
      - - Iani
        - - Tenontosaurus tilletti
          - Tenontosaurus dossi
    - Rhabdodontoidea
      - Rhabdodon
      - Foskeia ('Vegagete ornithopod')
      - - Mochlodon vorosi
        - Mochlodon suessi
      - - Zalmoxes shqiperorum
        - Zalmoxes robustus
        - Pareisactus
        - Matheronodon
