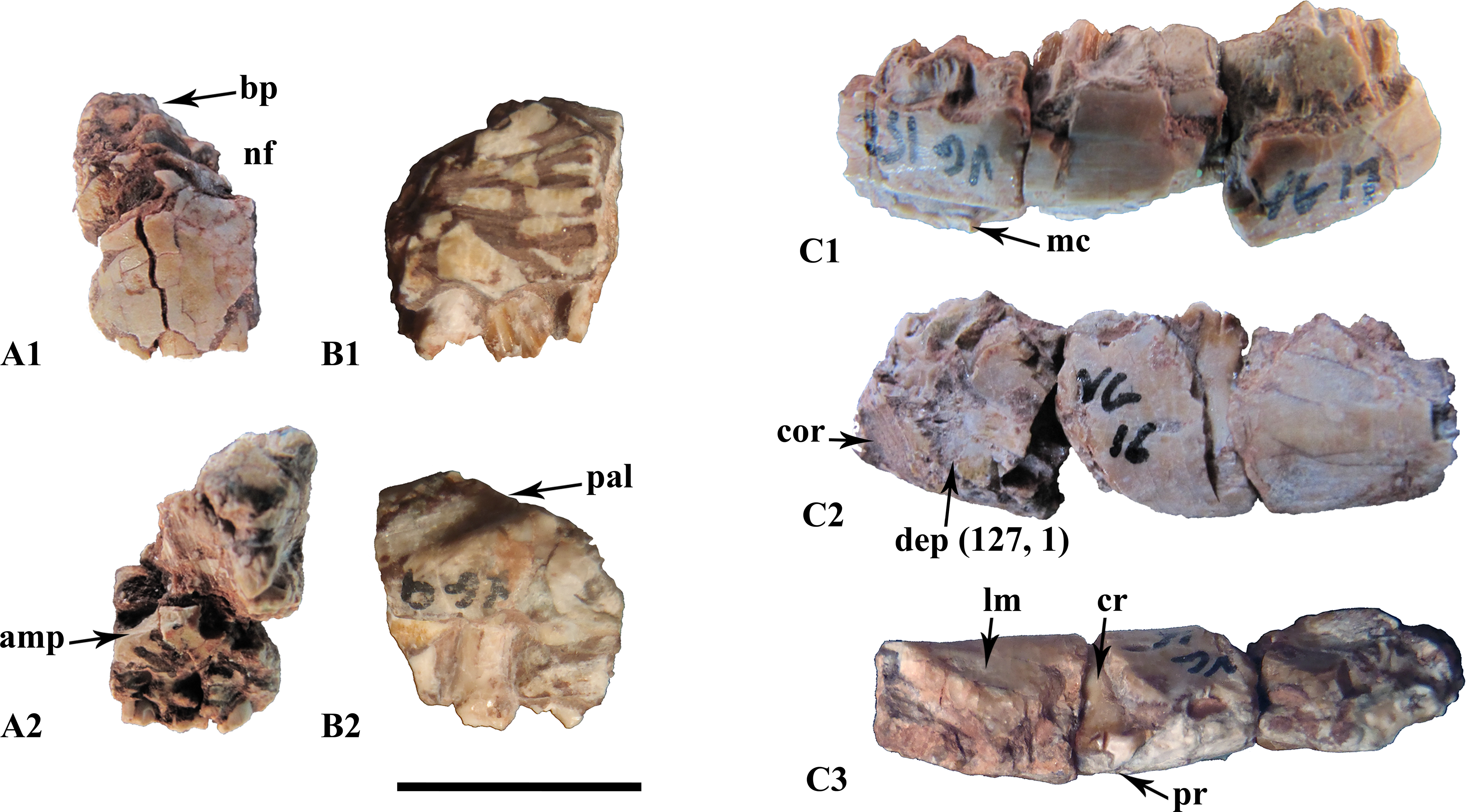
- Snout elements of the paratype (A) and holotype (B-C) of F. pelendonum

Scientific classification
- Kingdom: Animalia
- Phylum: Chordata
- Class: Reptilia
- Clade: Dinosauria
- Clade: †Ornithischia
- Clade: †Ornithopoda
- Clade: †Rhabdodontomorpha
- Genus: †Foskeia; Dieudonné et al., 2026
- Species: †F. pelendonum

Binomial name
- †Foskeia pelendonum Dieudonné et al., 2026

= Foskeia =

Foskeia Temporal range: Early Cretaceous, Barremian–Aptian

Genus of iguanodontian dinosaurs

Foskeia is an extinct genus of rhabdodontomorph ornithopod dinosaurs known from the Early Cretaceous (Barremian to Aptian ages) Castrillo de la Reina Formation of Spain. The genus contains a single species, Foskeia pelendonum, known from fossils of multiple individuals of different ontogenetic stages. Before its formal description, it had been nicknamed the "Vegagete ornithopod."

== History of discovery ==
In 2016, Dieudonné et al. reported the discovery of at least five individuals of a gracile, small-bodied ornithopod (approximately 0.5 m (1.6 ft) long), representing several distinct ontogenetic stages. Despite the abundance of material, the describers refrained from assigning a binomial name to it, instead referring to it as the "Vegagete ornithopod," after the locality where the fossils were found. This locality is part of the Castrillo de la Reina Formation (Cameros Basin) in Burgos Province, Spain, a site known for its rich diversity of Early Cretaceous dinosaur remains.

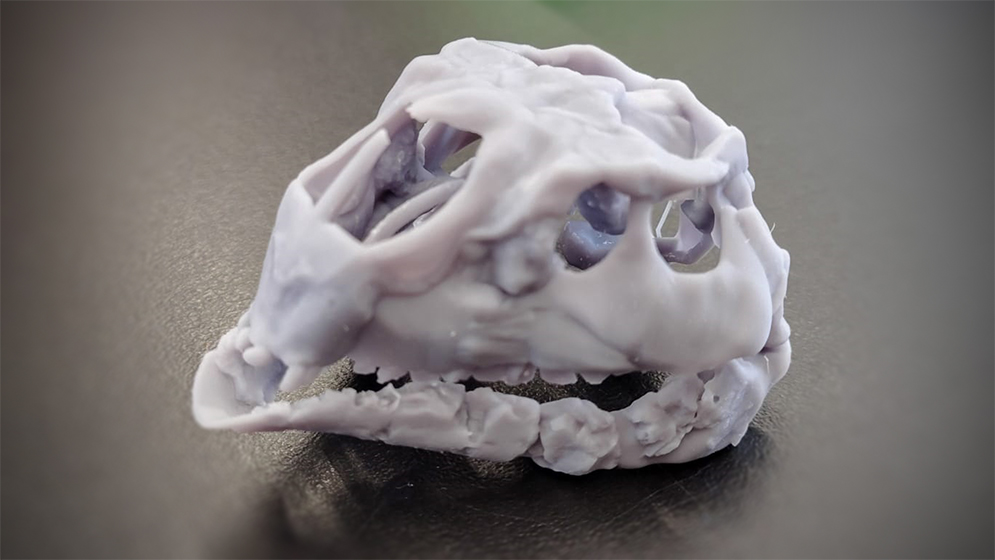
3D skull reconstruction

The discovery of new cranial elements in subsequent fieldwork and assessment of this material via μCT scanning allowed the remains to be formally described as a new genus and species of rhabdodontomorph ornithopod in 2026. The generic name, Foskeia, is derived from the Ancient Greek words φῶς (light) and βόσκειν (to forage), referring to its small size and presumed herbivorous habits. The specific name, pelendonum, is a reference to the Pelendones, a Celtiberian tribe from the Fuentes de Duero, near the type locality.

== Paleobiology ==
Analysis of the limb bones performed by Dieudonné et al. (2023) revealed that Foskeia juveniles began life as quadrupedal animals. However, at an early stage in their ontogeny, they transitioned to bipedalism. Histological analysis of the limb bones further revealed that the largest known individual of Foskeia represents a late subadult, which supports the interpretation that the species was among the smallest ornithopods. The study showed that the ontogenetic pathway of Foskeia involved significant skeletal changes, with muscle attachment marks observed on the femora and tibiae indicating the gradual development of a more dynamic and efficient locomotor system as the animal matured. This postural transition is consistent with other early rhabdodontomorphs.

== Classification ==
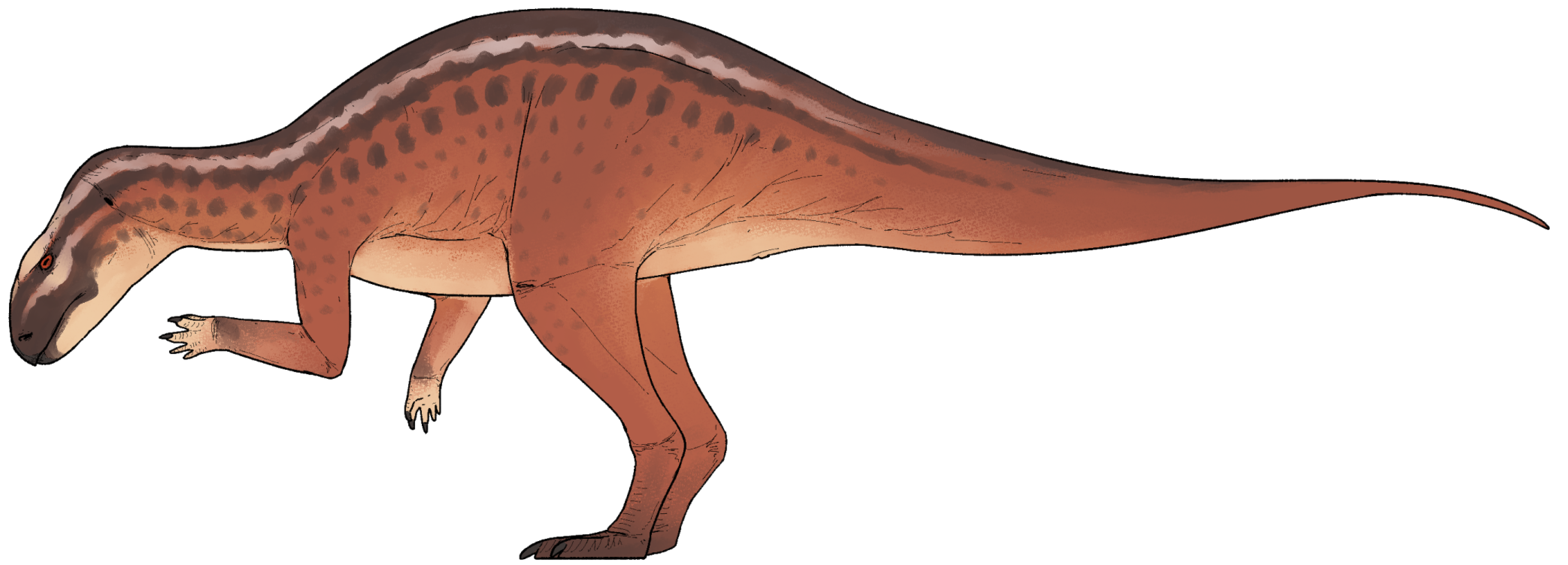
Speculative life restoration

When it was first described by Dieudonné and colleagues in 2016, the then-unnamed Vegagete ornithopod was found to be a basal member of the newly named clade Rhabdodontomorpha, diverging after Muttaburrasaurus as the sister-taxon of the Rhabdodontidae. A cladogram adapted from their analysis is shown below:

- Iguanodontia
  - - Anabisetia
    - - Tenontosaurus
      - Dryomorpha
  - Rhabdodontomorpha
    - Muttaburrasaurus
    - - Vegagete ornithopod
      - Rhabdodontidae
        - Mochlodon
        - - Rhabdodon
          - Zalmoxes

In 2025, Czepiński & Madzia re-analyzed all rhabdodontomorph material known at that time. Scoring their results in the comprehensive ornithischian-focused phylogenetic analysis of Fonseca et al. (2024), they recovered the Vegagete ornithopod as a member of the Rhabdodontoidea. The broader rhabdodontomorph clade was recovered in a basal (primitive) position within the Iguanodontia. The rhabdodontomorph results of their analysis are shown below:

- Rhabdodontomorpha
  - Obelignathus
  - - Transylvanosaurus
    - 'Quarante rhabdodontomorph'
    - Ampelognathus
    - Tenontosauridae
      - Convolosaurus
      - - Iani
        - - Tenontosaurus tilletti
          - Tenontosaurus dossi
    - Rhabdodontoidea
      - Rhabdodon
      - Vegagete ornithopod
      - - Mochlodon vorosi
        - Mochlodon suessi
      - - Zalmoxes shqiperorum
        - Zalmoxes robustus
        - Pareisactus
        - Matheronodon

In 2026, upon the formal naming of the Vegagete ornithopod, Dieudonné et al. placed the taxon within a novel subclade within the Rhabdodontomorpha, which they named Rhabdodontia. Foskeia was recovered diverging after Muttaburrasaurus and Fostoria, as the sister taxon to a traditional Rhabdodontidae. Contrary to previous analyses, the rhabdodontomorph clade was placed in a more derived (advanced) position, at the base of the Ankylopollexia. A cladogram adapted from their analysis is shown below:

- Iguanodontia
  - Dryosauridae
  - - - Uteodon
      - Ankylopollexia
    - Rhabdodontomorpha
      - Muttaburrasaurus
      - - Fostoria
        - Rhabdodontia
          - Foskeia
          - Rhabdodontidae
            - Rhabdodon
            - - Zalmoxes
              - - Mochlodon vorosi (=Ajkaceratops)
                - - Mochlodon suessi
                  - 'K2 rhabdodontid'
