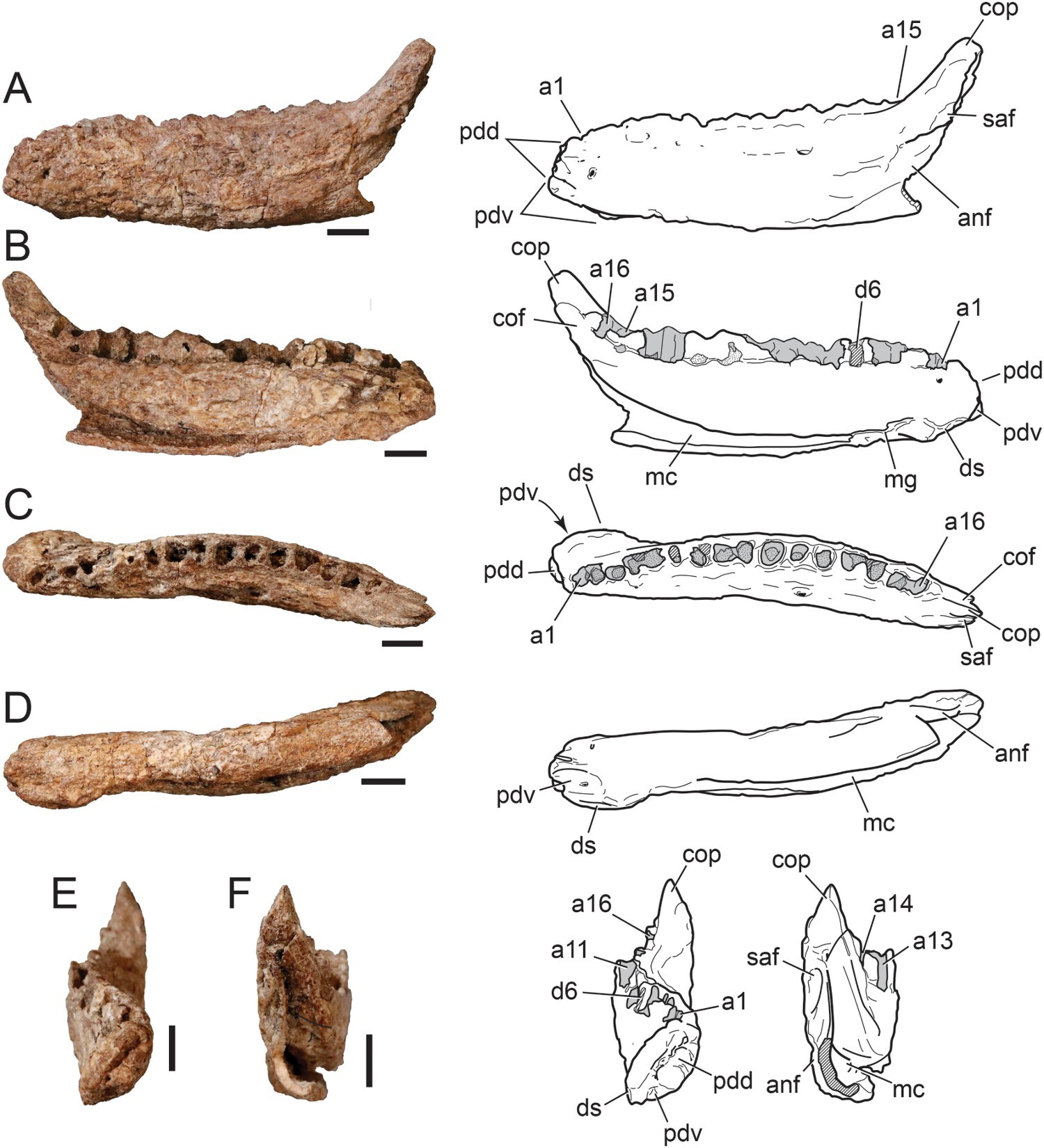
- Holotype dentary

Scientific classification
- Kingdom: Animalia
- Phylum: Chordata
- Clade: Dinosauria
- Clade: †Ornithischia
- Clade: †Ornithopoda
- Clade: †Iguanodontia
- Clade: †Rhabdodontomorpha (?)
- Genus: †Ampelognathus
- Species: †A. coheni

Binomial name
- †Ampelognathus coheni Tykoski, Contreras & Noto, 2023

= Ampelognathus =

Ampelognathus Temporal range: Late Cretaceous, Cenomanian

Genus of ornithopod dinosaurs

Ampelognathus (meaning "grapevine jaw") is an extinct genus of possibly rhabdodontomorph ornithopod dinosaurs from the Late Cretaceous (Cenomanian) Lewisville Formation of Texas. The type species is Ampelognathus coheni.

== Discovery and naming ==
The Ampelognathus holotype, DMNH 2021-05-02, was found in sediments of the Lewisville Formation of the Woodbine Group (Arlington or Tarrant Member), dated to the Cenomanian age of the Late Cretaceous period, in the Grapevine Lake emergency spillway of Tarrant County in Texas, United States. The specimen consists of a single, nearly-complete left dentary. It was found 100 metres (330 ft) away from the holotype of the enantiornithean bird Flexomornis.

In 2023, Tykoski, Contreras & Noto described Ampelognathus coheni as a new genus and species of ornithopod dinosaur. The generic name, "Ampelognathus", combines the Greek words "ampelos", meaning "grapevine", and "gnathos", meaning "jaw", in reference to the type locality in the emergency spillway of Grapevine Lake in Texas. The specific name, "coheni", honors Murray Cohen, the discoverer of the holotype specimen.

== Phylogeny ==
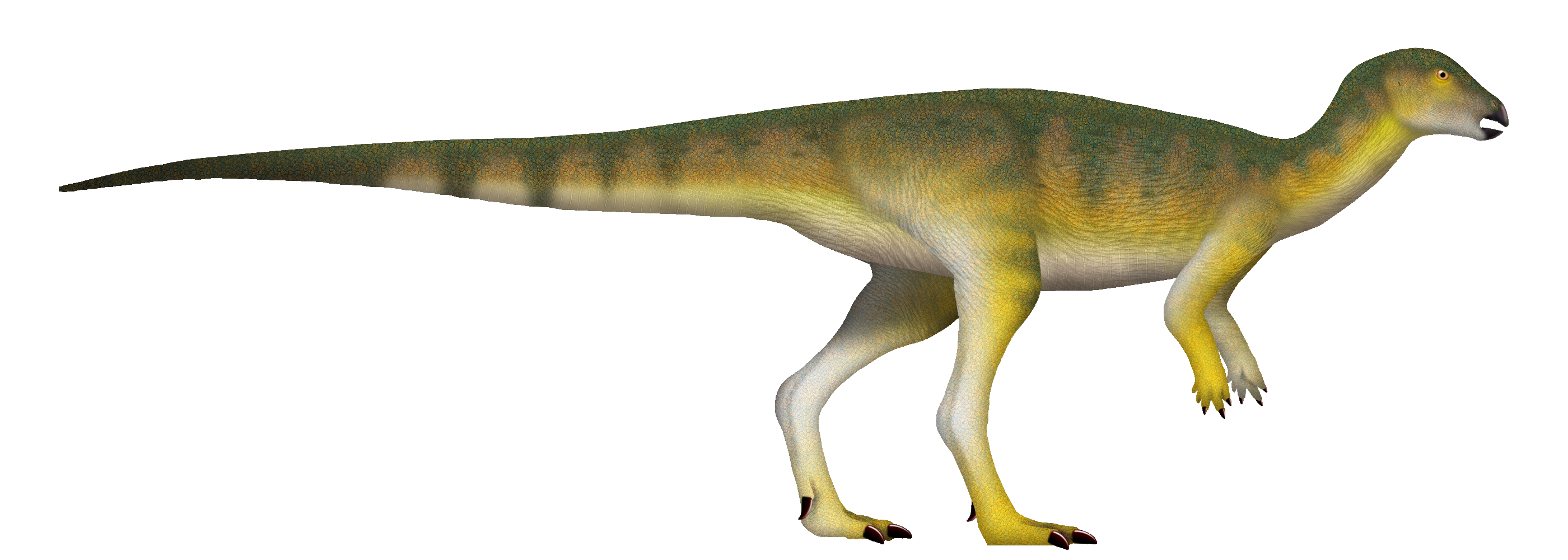
Speculative life restoration based on the initial interpretation

In their phylogenetic analyses, Tykoski, Contreras & Noto (2023) recovered Ampelognathus as a basal member of the Ornithopoda, as the sister taxon to the clade containing Thescelosaurus and the Iguanodontia. Ampelognathus was thus likely more closely related to iguanodontians than to the morphologically similar "hypsilophodonts". The results of their phylogenetic analyses are shown in the cladogram below:

- Ornithopoda
  - Nanosaurus
  - - Changchunsaurus
    - - Jeholosaurus
      - - Haya
        - - Yandusaurus
          - - Convolosaurus
            - Hypsilophodon
            - Koreanosaurus
            - Orodromeus
            - Yueosaurus
            - Zephyrosaurus
            - - Kulindadromeus
              - - Gasparinisaura
                - Parksosaurus
            - - Ampelognathus
              - - Thescelosaurus spp.
                - Iguanodontia

In 2024, Fonseca et al. comprehensively reanalyzed the interrelationships of early ornithischians, but were unable to include Ampelognathus in their phylogenetic analysis as the paper describing it was published after their data collection was completed. However, they commented on its relationships, stating that certain traits supported it as a member of Rhabdodontomorpha, but a more basal member than either Tenontosauridae or Rhabdodontoidea. This position was subsequently supported in a 2025 publication by Czepiński & Madzia focused on rhabdodontomorphs, who included Ampelognathus in the phylogenetic dataset of Fonseca et al. (2024) and recovered results consistent with those postulated by the latter authors. These results are displayed in the cladogram below:

- Rhabdodontomorpha
  - Obelignathus
  - - Transylvanosaurus
    - 'Quarante rhabdodontomorph'
    - Ampelognathus
    - Tenontosauridae
      - Convolosaurus
      - - Iani
        - - Tenontosaurus tilletti
          - Tenontosaurus dossi
    - Rhabdodontoidea
      - Rhabdodon
      - Foskeia ('Vegagete ornithopod')
      - - Mochlodon vorosi
        - Mochlodon suessi
      - - Zalmoxes shqiperorum
        - Zalmoxes robustus
        - Pareisactus
        - Matheronodon
