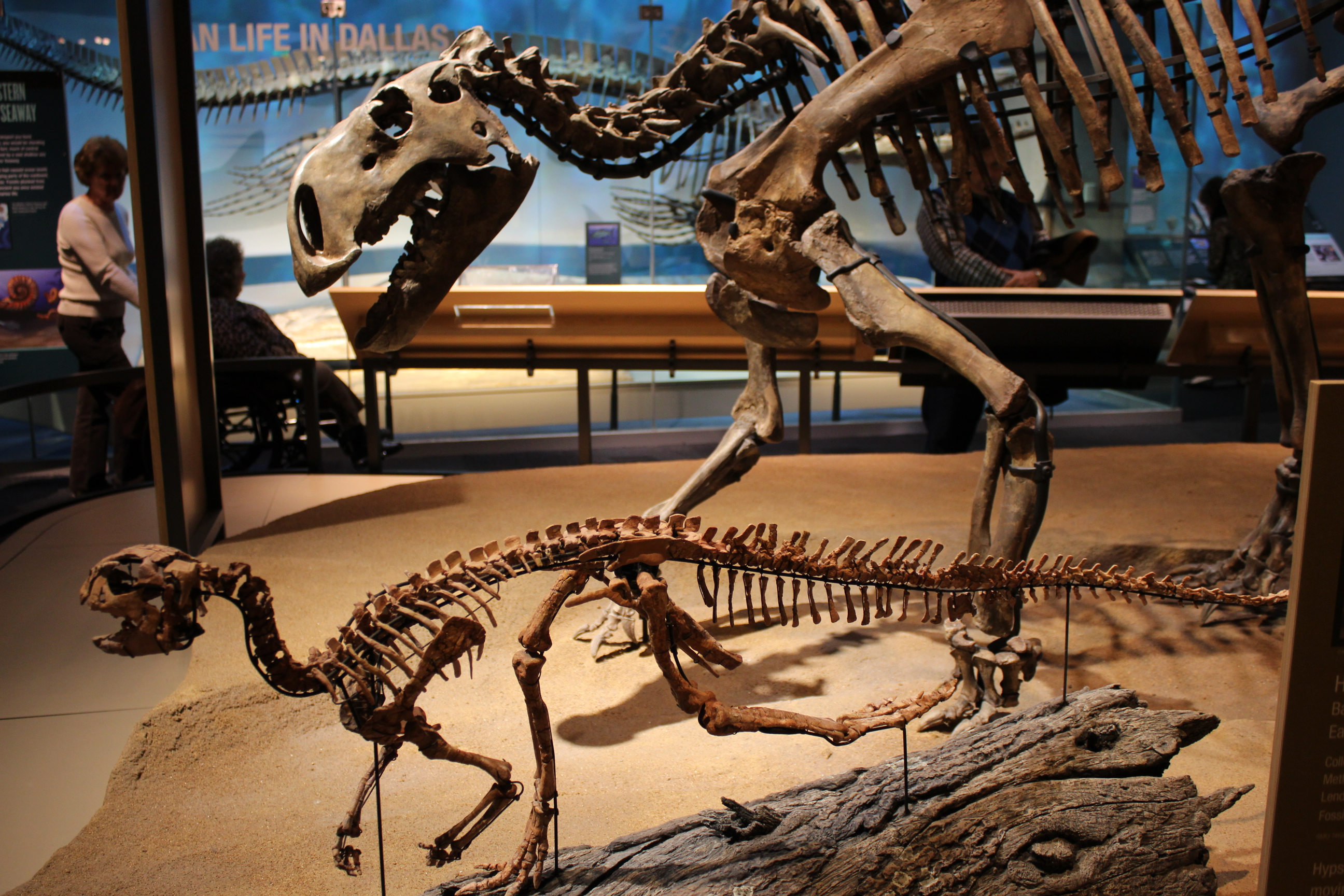
- Tenontosaurus (background) and Convolosaurus (foreground), both tenontosaurids

Scientific classification
- Kingdom: Animalia
- Phylum: Chordata
- Class: Reptilia
- Clade: Dinosauria
- Clade: †Ornithischia
- Clade: †Ornithopoda
- Clade: †Iguanodontia
- Clade: †Rhabdodontomorpha; Dieudonné et al., 2016

Subgroups
- †Ampelognathus; †Emiliasaura?; †Foskeia; †Fostoria?; †Muttaburrasaurus?; †Obelignathus; †Tenontosauridae? Fonseca et al., 2024; †Convolosaurus; †Iani; †Tenontosaurus; †Rhabdodontoidea Poole, 2022; †Mochlodon; †Transylvanosaurus; †Rhabdodontidae

= Rhabdodontomorpha =

Rhabdodontomorpha Temporal range: Cretaceous, 140–66 Ma

Clade of iguanodont dinosaurs

Rhabdodontomorpha is a clade of basal iguanodont dinosaurs. This group was named in 2016 in the context of the description, based on Spanish findings of an early member of the Rhabdodontidae. A cladistic analysis was conducted in which it was found that Muttaburrasaurus was the sister species of the Rhabdodontidae sensu Weishampel. Therefore, Paul-Emile Dieudonné and colleagues defined Rhabdodontomorpha as a node-based clade: the group consisting of the last common ancestor of Rhabdodon priscus and Muttaburrasaurus langdoni, and all its descendants. Within the clade Zalmoxes and Mochlodon are also included. In 2021, Daniel Madzia redefined Rhabdodontomorpha in the PhyloCode as "the largest clade containing Rhabdodon priscus, but not Iguanodon bernissartensis and Hypsilophodon foxii". The clade is characterized by the following synapomorphies:

- the outline of the dorsal iliac margin is sigmoidal in dorsal view, with the postacetabular process deflected medialward and the pre-acetabular process deflected laterally
- the dorsal iliac margin is mediolaterally broader and swollen from above the ischiac peduncle anteriorly (present in Muttaburrasaurus) or above the postacetabular process all along (present in Zalmoxes spp.)
- the presence of a weak, dorsally convex ridge on the ventromedial side of their postacetabular process
- the ischiac peduncle of the ilium is lenticular and uniquely anteroposteriorly long
- the acetabulum is noticeably low

The group consists of small to large plant eaters from Europe and Gondwana. It must have split from other iguanodont groups during the Middle Jurassic. In 2020, the Australian iguanodont Fostoria was also found to belong to this clade. The slightly less inclusive Rhabdodontoidea was named by Karen Poole in 2022 and defined by Fonseca and colleagues in 2024 in the PhyloCode as "the largest clade containing Rhabdodon priscus, but not Hypsilophodon foxii, Iguanodon bernissartensis, and Tenontosaurus tilletti". This clade includes the family Rhabdodontidae and all rhabdodontomorphs closer to them than to the tenontosaurids. Tenontosaurus and its close relatives belong to the family Tenontosauridae, defined in the PhyloCode as "the largest clade containing Tenontosaurus tilletti, but not Hypsilophodon foxii, Iguanodon bernissartensis, and Rhabdodon priscus". They have been tentatively recovered as basal members of Rhabdodontomorpha, representing a North American radiation of this group. Iani, described in 2023, is interpreted as a transitional taxon between Tenontosaurus and Rhabdodontidae.
