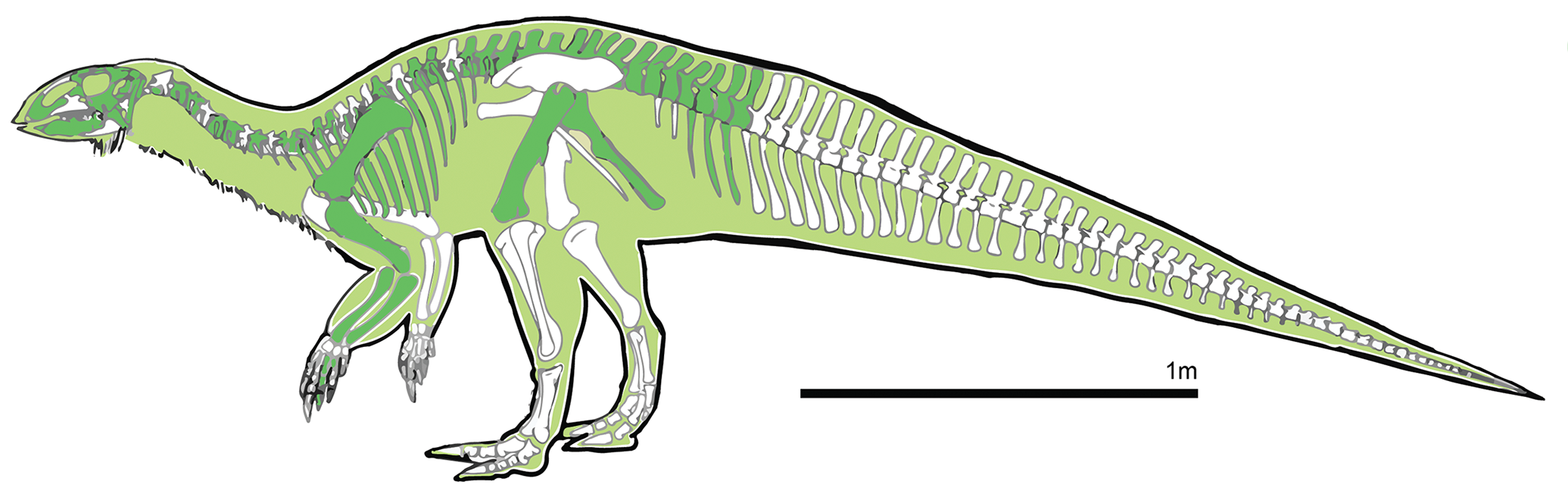
- Skeletal reconstruction showing known material in green

Scientific classification
- Kingdom: Animalia
- Phylum: Chordata
- Class: Reptilia
- Clade: Dinosauria
- Clade: †Ornithischia
- Clade: †Ornithopoda
- Clade: †Rhabdodontomorpha
- Genus: †Iani; Zanno et al., 2023
- Species: †I. smithi

Binomial name
- †Iani smithi Zanno et al., 2023

= Iani =

Iani Temporal range: Late Cretaceous (Cenomanian), ~99.5 Ma

Genus of iguanodontian dinosaur

Iani (after Ianus) is an extinct genus of rhabdodontomorph iguanodontian dinosaur known from the Late Cretaceous Cedar Mountain Formation of Utah, United States. The genus contains a single species, Iani smithi, known from a partial skeleton including the skull. Its discovery serves as a morphological link between the genus Tenontosaurus and Late Cretaceous members of the clade Rhabdodontomorpha.

== Discovery and naming ==
The Iani smithi holotype specimen, NCSM 29373, was discovered in 2014 in sediments of the Cedar Mountain Formation (lower Mussentuchit Member) in Emery County, Utah, United States. The specimen consists of a partial skeleton including a nearly complete, disarticulated skull, cervical, dorsal, sacral, and caudal vertebrae, ribs and haemal arches, partial pectoral and pelvic girdles, and the right arm and leg.

In 2023, Lindsay Zanno and colleagues described Iani smithi as a new genus and species of rhabdodontomorph iguanodontian based on these fossil remains. The generic name, "Iani", alludes to Ianus, the Roman god of transitions, referencing the changing biota of the time. The specific name, "smithi", honors Joshua Aaron Smith and his paleontological contributions.

== Classification ==
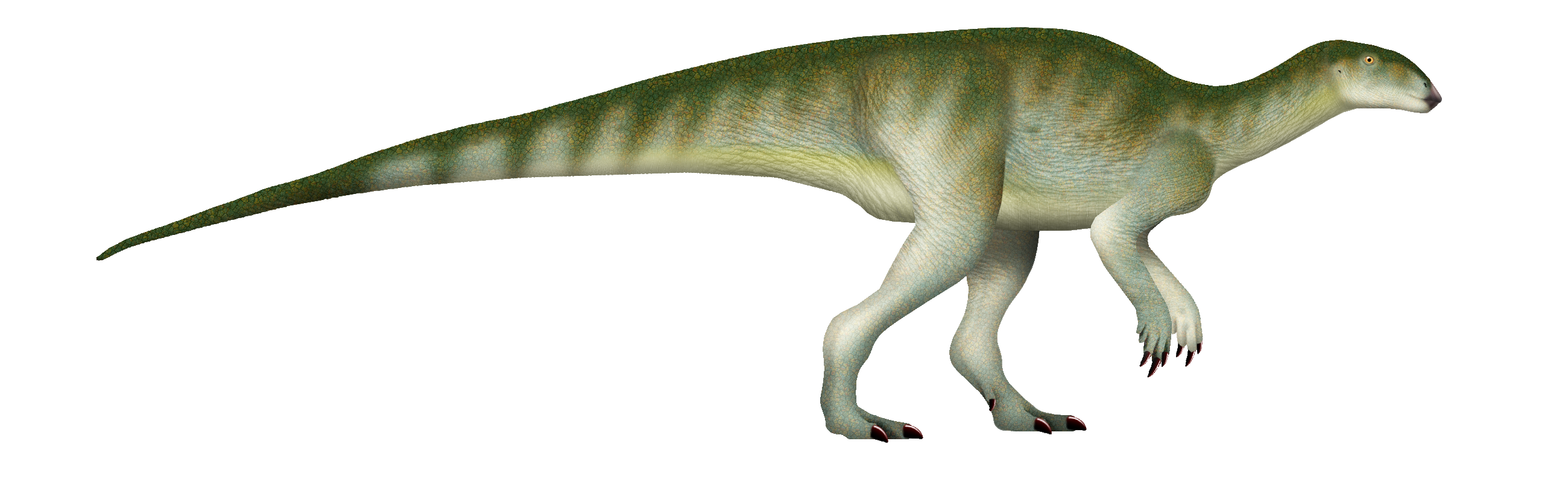
Life reconstruction of Iani

Zanno et al. (2023) recovered Iani as a basal rhabdodontomorph member of the Iguanodontia. They interpreted it as a transitional taxon between Tenontosaurus and other Late Cretaceous rhabdodontomorphs (the Rhabdodontidae). The cladograms below display the results of their phylogenetic analyses using different datasets:

Topology 1: Poole (2022) dataset

- Rhabdodontomorpha
  - Muttaburrasaurus
  - - - Iani
      - - Tenontosaurus dossi
        - Tenontosaurus tilletti
    - - Rhabdodon
      - - Zalmoxes shqiperorum
        - Zalmoxes robustus

Topology 2: Dieudonné et al. (2021) dataset

- Rhabdodontomorpha
  - - Tenontosaurus dossi
    - Tenontosaurus tilletti
  - - Iani
    - - - Rhabdodon sp1
        - Rhabdodon priscus
      - - - Zalmoxes shqiperorum
          - Zalmoxes robustus
        - - - Mochlodon vorosi
            - Mochlodon suessi
          - - Transylvanosaurus
            - - Foskeia ('Vegagete ornithopod')
              - - Muttaburrasaurus
                - - Fostoria
