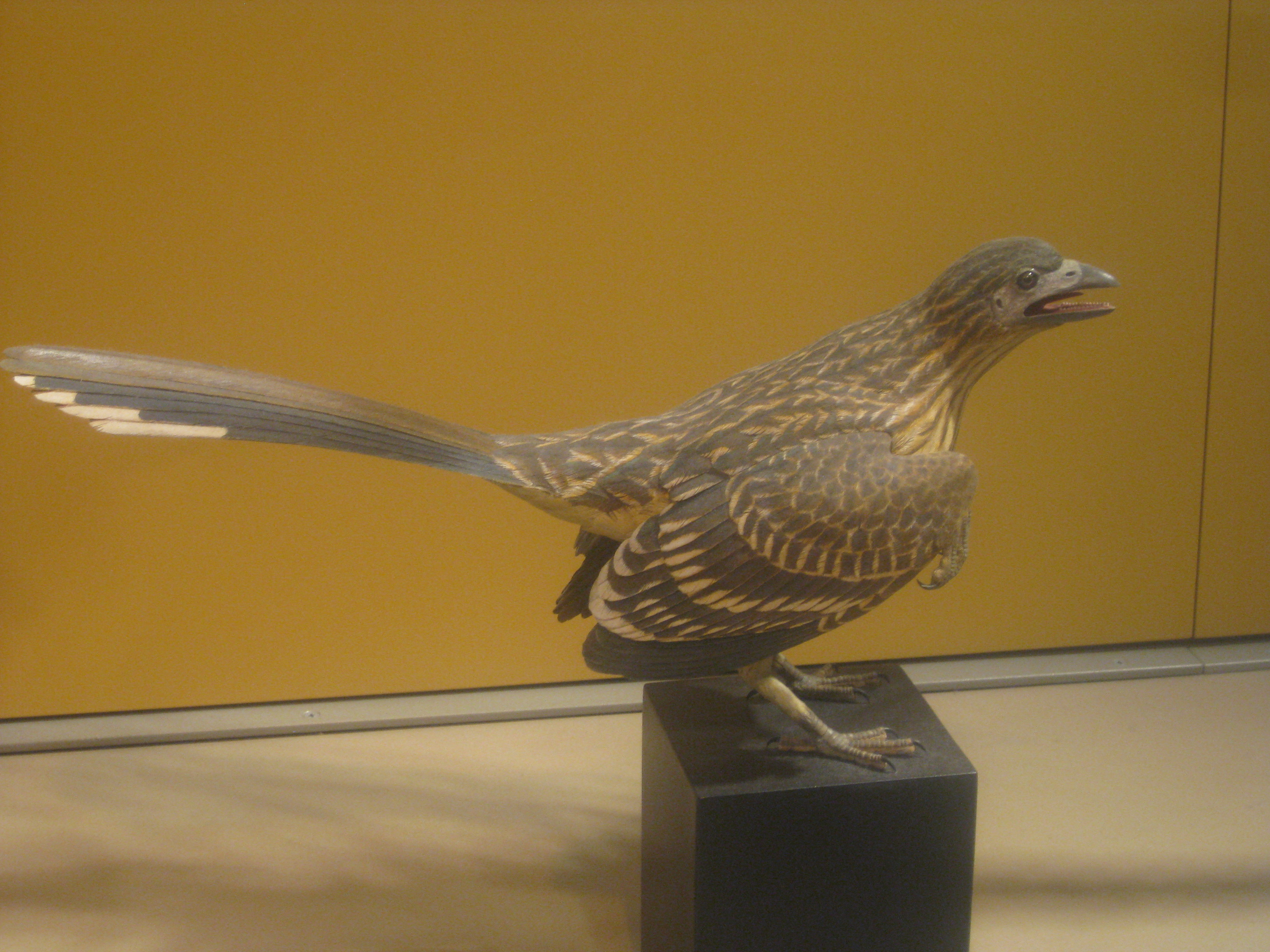
- Model at the Perot Museum of Nature and Science

Scientific classification
- Kingdom: Animalia
- Phylum: Chordata
- Class: Reptilia
- Clade: Dinosauria
- Clade: Saurischia
- Clade: Theropoda
- Clade: Avialae
- Clade: †Enantiornithes
- Genus: †Flexomornis; Tykoski & Fiorillo, 2010
- Species: †F. howei

Binomial name
- †Flexomornis howei Tykoski & Fiorillo, 2010

= Flexomornis =

Flexomornis Temporal range: Late Cretaceous, 96 Ma

Extinct genus of bird

Flexomornis (meaning "flexed shoulder bird") is an extinct genus of enantiornithean bird known from the Woodbine Formation (Lewisville Member) of Texas, United States, dating to the middle Cenomanian age of the late Cretaceous period. It contains a single species, Flexomornis howei, named for the amateur fossil hunter Kris Howe, who discovered the site where the fossils were found.

The holotype of F. howei was found 100 metres (330 ft) away from the holotype of Ampelognathus coheni.
