= Attila Ősi =

Hungarian geologist and paleontologist

- Born: May 12, 1980 (age 46); Ajka, Hungary
- Education: Eötvös Loránd University
- Known for: Research at the Iharkút Cretaceous vertebrate site
- Scientific career
- Fields: Geology, Paleontology
- Workplaces: Hungarian Academy of Sciences – Hungarian Natural History Museum

Attila Ősi (born 12 May 1980) is a Hungarian geologist and paleontologist. He is one of the discoverers of the Iharkút Cretaceous vertebrate site in the Bakony Mountains and has led its excavations since 2000. He is currently a research fellow of the Hungarian Academy of Sciences and Hungarian Natural History Museum Paleontology Research Group.

== Career ==
Ősi became interested in paleontology as a high school student in Ajka, where he and friends collected fossils in the Bakony region. After winning a national geology competition, he entered Eötvös Loránd University in 1999 without entrance exams. In 2000, he and a colleague discovered vertebrate remains in the Iharkút bauxite mine, leading to the identification of a rich Late Cretaceous vertebrate site. He organized annual excavations, which continue under his leadership. He received his MSc in geology in 2003, with a thesis on the Late Cretaceous dinosaur fauna of Hungary, and earned his PhD in 2006 with a dissertation on heterodont crocodiles.

In 2010, Ősi and his team unearthed an 85-million-year-old ceratopsian, later named Ajkaceratops.

== Awards ==
- Junior Prima Award (2010, science category)
