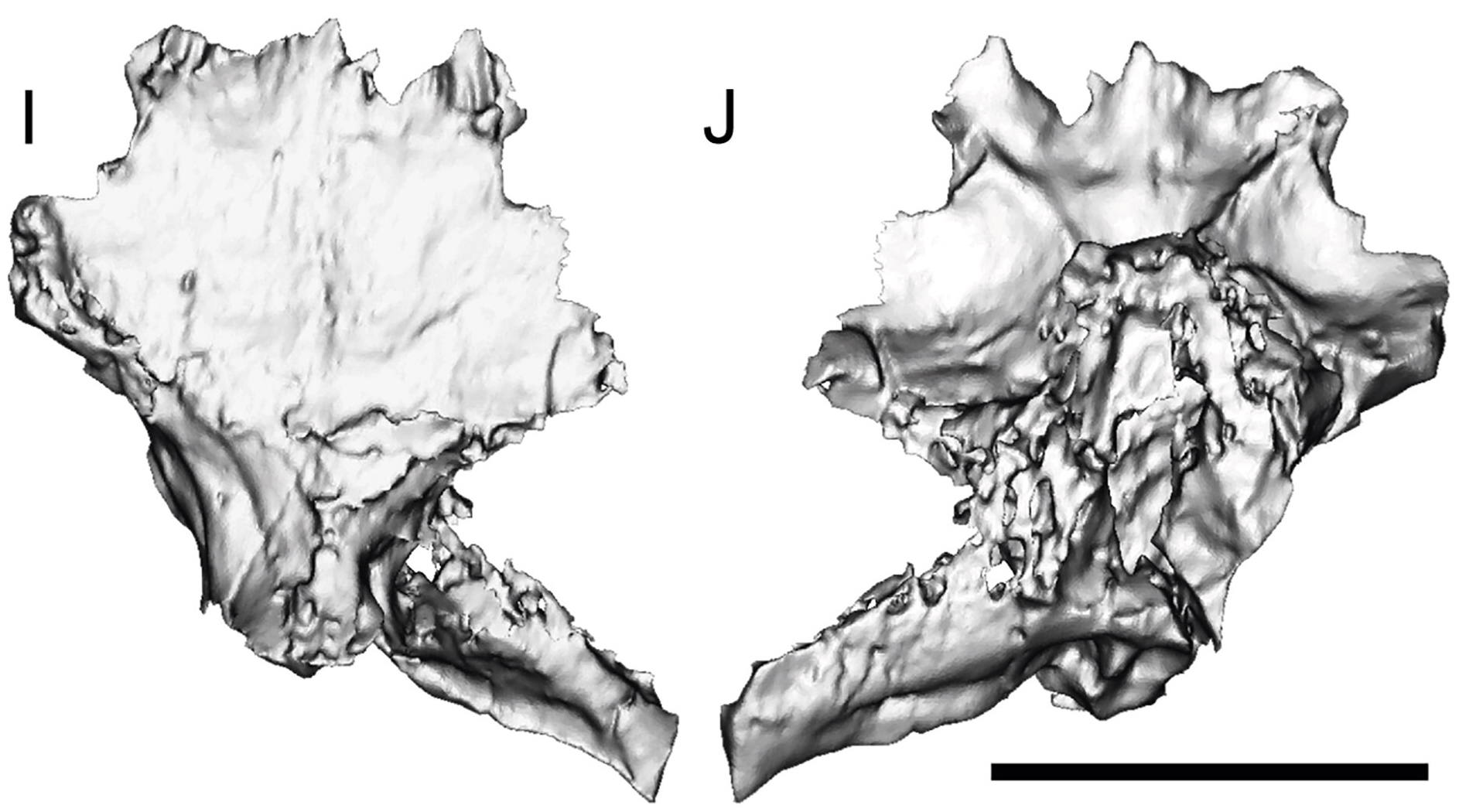
- 3D rendering of the braincase

Scientific classification
- Kingdom: Animalia
- Phylum: Chordata
- Class: Reptilia
- Clade: Dinosauria
- Clade: †Ornithischia
- Clade: †Ornithopoda
- Clade: †Rhabdodontomorpha (?)
- Genus: †Fostoria; Bell et al., 2019

Type species
- †Fostoria dhimbangunmal Bell et al., 2019

= Fostoria dhimbangunmal =

Fostoria Temporal range: Late Cretaceous, Cenomanian

Extinct species of dinosaur

Fostoria (named after Robert Foster who discovered the type locality and bones; the specific name dhimbangunmal means "sheep yard" in the languages of the Yuwaalaraay, Yuwaalayaay, and Gamilaraay peoples of Australia) is a genus of iguanodontian ornithopod dinosaur from the Griman Creek Formation of New South Wales, Australia. The type and only species, Fostoria dhimbangunmal was described in 2019.

== Classification ==
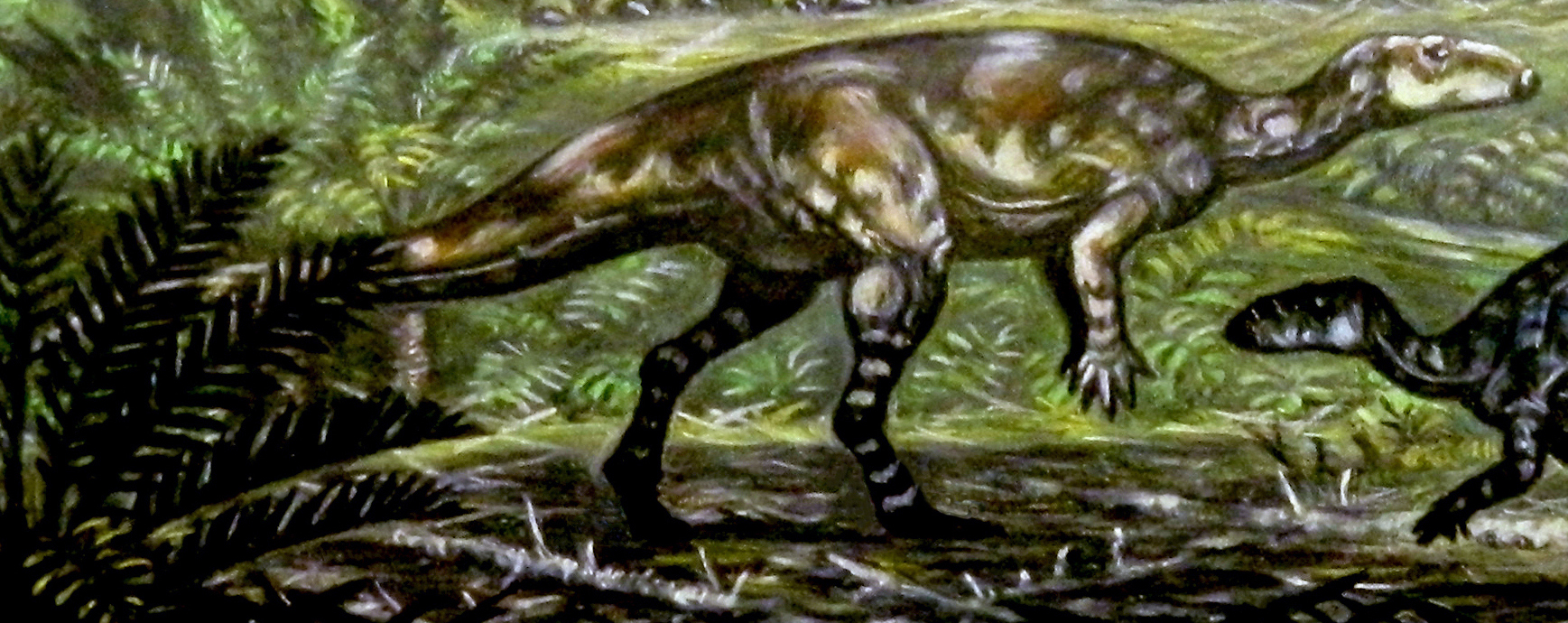
Life restoration

Fostoria was classified within the clade Iguanodontia by the describing authors, who entered it into a recent phylogenetic matrix but with some modifications and recodings. It was found to be the most basal of a clade comprising Anabisetia, Muttaburrasaurus. and Talenkauen, supported by the following synapomorphies:

- frontals contacting less than 25% of the orbit
- paroccipital processes (exoccipital-opisthotic complex) extending laterally and are slightly dorsoventrally expanded distally
- caudal ribs located on neural arch

However, a recent study covering the phylogeny of Cerapoda using the same matrix as Bell et al. (2019) found Fostoria to be within the Rhabdodontomorpha, sharing the following features with the derived rhabdodontids: (1) A nearly vertical suture between its supraoccipital and opisthotics and (2) the length of the distolateral condyle on the distal extremity of femur (not accounting for its posterolateral condylid) is less than 40% the total distal width of the femur.

== History of discovery ==
In 1984, Bob Foster, an opal miner, discovered a vertebra from an ornithopod in Lightning Ridge. Foster originally interpreted the fossil as a hoof belonging to a horse. Foster eventually found so many fossils in his mine that he showed his finds to paleontologists of the Australian Museum in Sydney. After they had a look at the Fostoria fossils, paleontologist Alexander Ritchie with some army reservists travelled to the mine to excavate more fossils. The fossils were prepared but remained unstudied until 2015. Foster in the early 21st century removed the finds from a private opal museum and exhibited them in, and later donated them to the Australian Opal Centre in Lightning Ridge, where they remain to this day.
