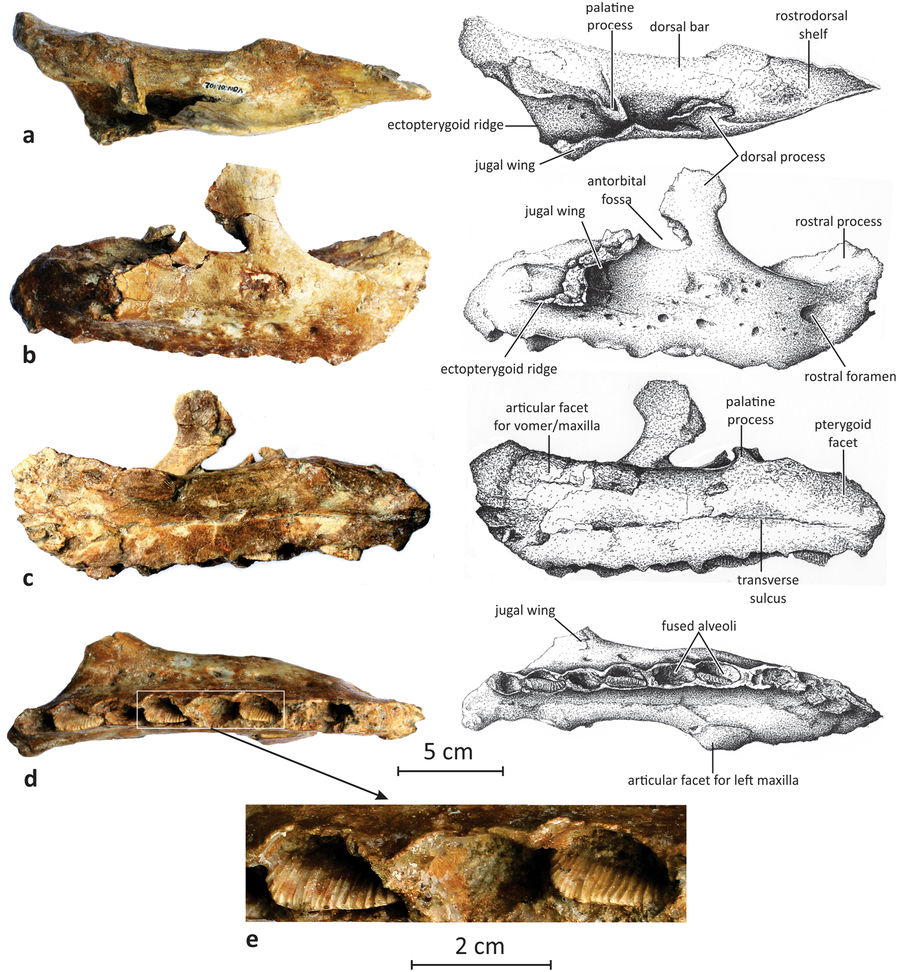
- Holotype maxilla

Scientific classification
- Kingdom: Animalia
- Phylum: Chordata
- Class: Reptilia
- Clade: Dinosauria
- Clade: †Ornithischia
- Clade: †Ornithopoda
- Family: †Rhabdodontidae
- Genus: †Matheronodon; Godefroit et al., 2017

Type species
- Matheronodon provincialis Godefroit et al., 2017

= Matheronodon =

Matheronodon Temporal range: Late Campanian, 74–72 Ma

Extinct genus of dinosaurs

Matheronodon (meaning "Matheron tooth") is a genus of rhabdodontid ornithopod dinosaur from the late Cretaceous Period of the Grès à Reptiles Formation in France. The genus contains a single species, M. provincialis, which is known from a single maxilla and associated teeth. It was named by Pascal Godefroit and colleagues in 2017. The teeth of Matheronodon are large but few in number. The teeth are also in an unusual arrangement, emerging alternatingly from one of a pair of fused tooth sockets in its mouth. In life, the teeth would have functioned like a pair of scissors, allowing Matheronodon to feed on the tough leaves of monocot plants.

== Description ==
Like other rhabdodontids, Matheronodon would have been a bipedal herbivore. The length of the genus has been estimated at 5 metres (16 ft) by its lead describer Pascal Godefroit.

The maxilla of Matheronodon is a short, robust bone. The front portion is particularly shortened and also angled upwards, differentiating Matheronodon from other rhabdodontids. It measures 22 cm (8.7 in) long, and 10 cm (3.9 in) high. When viewed from the top, the front portion is triangular, and forms a broad rostrodorsal shelf. Both Rhabdodon and Zalmoxes lack the shelf. There is a bar-like structure on the interior surface, the dorsal bar, which is also present in Rhabdodon. Immediately below this bar, there is a horizontal groove, or transverse sulcus. Further behind, the upward-projecting dorsal process is wider and angled further backwards than Rhabdodon, and larger than Zalmoxes. From the base of this process, a "wing" extends backwards to articulate with the jugal bone. Also at the base of the dorsal process is a small triangular projection delimiting the back of the antorbital fenestra, which is shorter than Rhabdodon.

=== Teeth ===
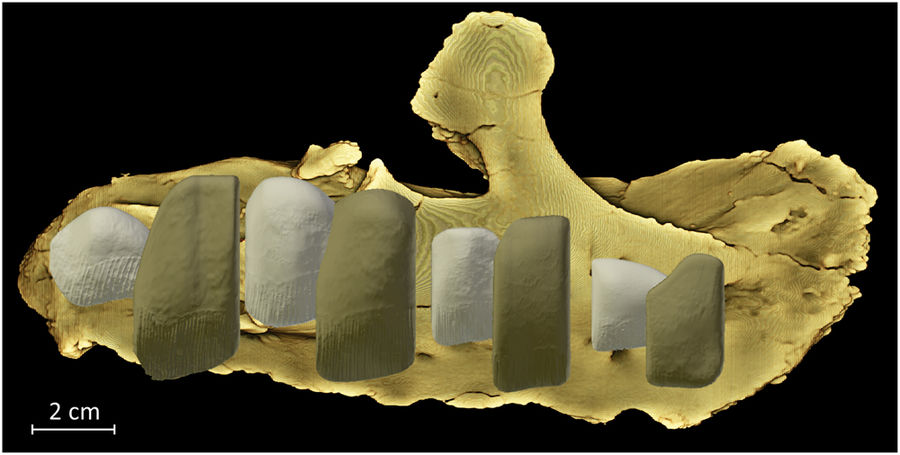
Reconstruction of the teeth in the maxilla

Like Rhabdodon, Zalmoxes, and Mochlodon, the maxillary tooth crowns of Matheronodon are shaped like cleavers. They are unusually large, being up to 5 cm (2.0 in) long. More than these other rhabdodontids, there are at least 25 ridges on the inner surface of each tooth. The ridges are all roughly the same size, and there is no "primary" ridge, identifying Matheronodon as a rhabdodontid. A single wear facet is oriented 60° below the horizontal, like Zalmoxes and Mochlodon. Enamel covers all sides of the teeth, unlike hadrosaurids, being thicker on the inner surface (particularly on the ridges, compared to Edmontosaurus). Also unlike hadrosaurids, the tubular structure of the dentine below the enamel does not appear to vary in orientation. The scratches on the dentine's surface are vertical like Zalmoxes and Mochlodon.

Even though the maxilla is large, it bears only eight tooth sockets. Zalmoxes has up to 10, and Rhabdodon has 11. The walls separating adjacent sockets appear to have been resorbed such that the sockets have fused into four pairs, which is not known in either Rhabdodon or Zalmoxes. Only one functional tooth would have been present in each pair at any time. From the preserved replacement teeth, it appears that tooth replacement progressed from the back to the front of the jaw, with teeth alternatingly emerging from the front and rear sockets in each pair. The tooth of each front socket would have overlapped those from the rear socket, due to the size of the crowns.

Unlike the teeth of the maxilla, the teeth of the lower jaw are leaf-shaped, and bear a primary ridge displaced backwards from the center of the crown. However, they are also large. The subsidiary ridges flanking the primary ridge are also more numerous than Rhabdodon or Mochlodon, with there being at least 12 on each side. These ridges stretch to the bottom edge of the crown, instead of stopping short as in Mochlodon.

== Discovery and naming ==
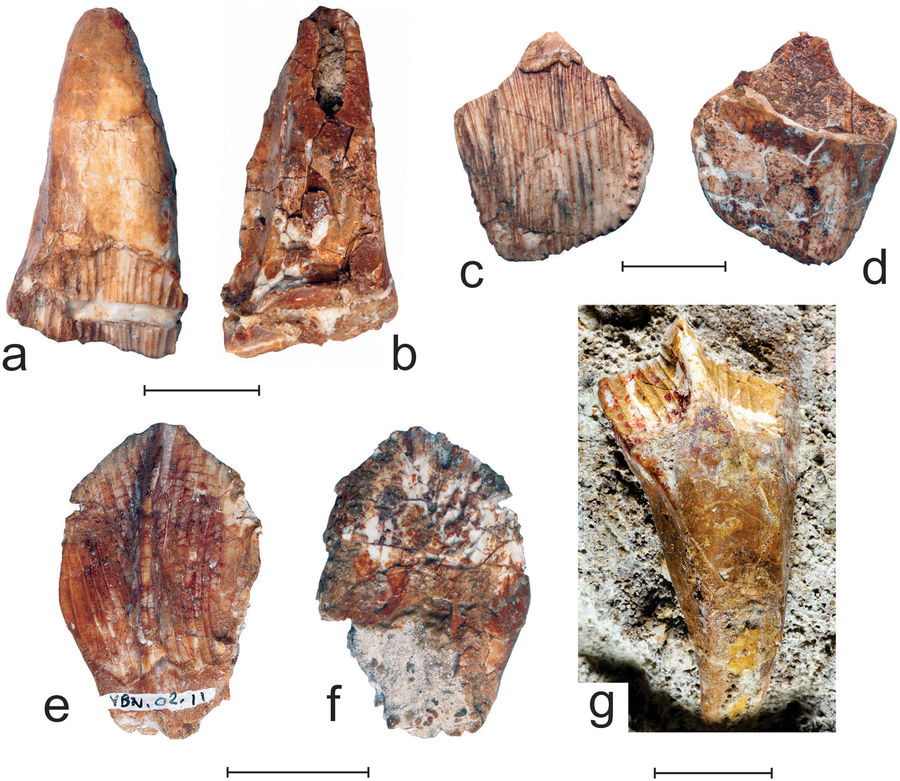
Teeth from the maxilla (a-d) and lower jaw (e-g)

All specimens of Matheronodon have been found at the locality of Velaux-La Bastide Neuve, in the Aix-en-Provence basin, Bouches-du-Rhône, France. The sandstones at this locality, which was discovered by Xavier Valentin in 1992, are part of the Begudian regional stage (which correlates to the late Campanian epoch, about 74 to 72 million years ago). After their discovery, the fossils were stored in the paleontology and archaeology collections of the municipality of Velaux, and labelled as belonging to the Musée du Moulin Seigneurial/Velaux-La Bastide Neuve (MMS/VBN). The type specimen is MMS/VBN-02-102, a right maxilla; associated with it are maxillary teeth (-93-34, -09-149a, -09-150, and -12-22) and dentary teeth: (-02-11, -09-43c, and -12-A002).

In 2017, the fossil material was described by Godefroit along with Géraldine Garcia, Bernard Gomez, Koen Stein, Aude Cincotta, Ulysse Lefèvre, and Valentin in a research paper published by the journal Nature Communications. They assigned this material to the genus Matheronodon, with the name being formed from Philippe Matheron (who described the first dinosaur fossils found in Provence, or the southeastern region of France) and the suffix -odon, a derivative of odous (Greek for "tooth"). They also named the type and only species M. provincialis, with provincialis being Latin for Provence. For the study, a CT scan of the type maxilla was conducted at the University of Liège, and a thin section of an isolated maxillary tooth was examined under a microscope.

== Palaeobiology ==
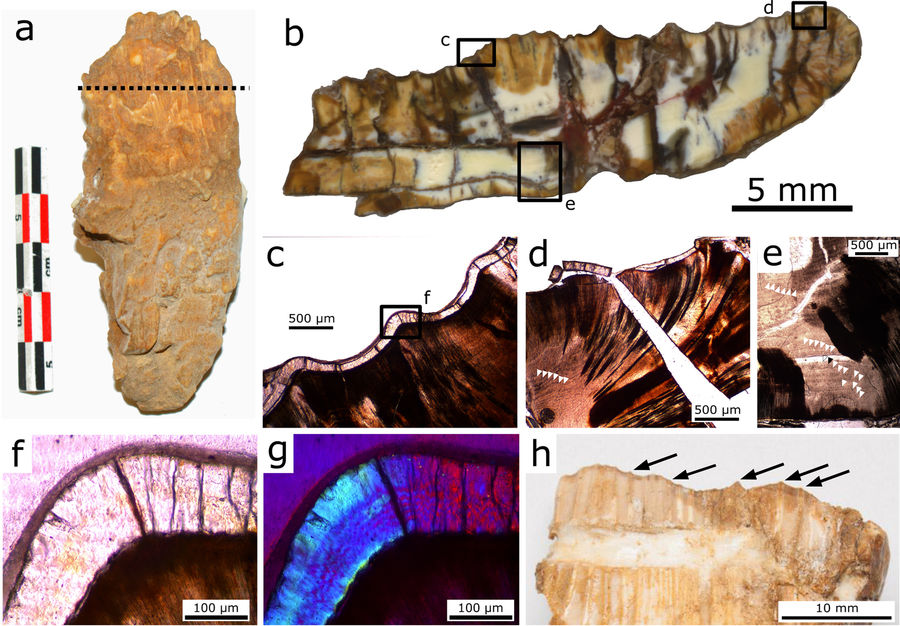
Microstructure of a thin slice from an isolated tooth

Inferences regarding the method of feeding in Matheronodon can be made from the unique morphology of its teeth. The hadrosaurs, a contemporary successful group of ornithopods, had a large number of wide, high crowned teeth in tightly packed rows. These were used in a complex method of chewing, a culmination of continued specialization throughout the evolution of iguanodonts. Rhabdodontids, which were more basal, had a far simpler arrangement, with teeth more similar to those of less specialized ornithopods. Fewer teeth were present in the jaw, but they were taller, thinner, and individually larger. In life, they would have functioned like a pair of scissors in powerful but simple slicing bites. The microstructure of the teeth in Mantheronodon was also adapted for this action.

These differences would have led to different diets in the two groups of ornithopods. Where they co-occurred, they were likely ecologically partitioned. Rhabdodontids would have had more limited diets, compared to the diverse and likely cellulose-rich and perhaps conifer-based diets of hadrosaurs. Mantheronodon and its relatives may have fed on monocot plants, such as the palms Sabalites and Pandanites, common in Europe at the time. Sclerenchyma fibres, abundant in monocot leaves but largely absent in eudicots and conifers, result in tougher plant tissue, and would have necessitated the more powerful bites of rhabdodontids to be consumed.

== Palaeoecology ==
Velaux-La Bastide Neuve represents a continental deposit. However, it was probably close to the shoreline, judging by the presence of claws from decapods, gastropods, and unionid mussels at the site. Fossils from the locality are well-preserved and were likely slowly transported. Other dinosaurs discovered at the site include the titanosaur Atsinganosaurus, in addition to teeth from nodosaurid ankylosaurs as well as neoceratosaurian and dromaeosaurid theropods. Additional faunal elements include the eusuchian Allodaposuchus, pterosaurs, the turtles Solemys and Polysternon, the hybodont elasmobranch Meristonoides, and a gar.

== See also ==
- 2017 in archosaur paleontology
- Magyar, J. et al. 2024. Rhabdodontid (Dinosauria, Ornithopoda) diversity suggested by the first documented occurrence of associated cranial and postcranial material at Vălioara (uppermost Cretaceous Densuș-Ciula Formation, Hațeg Basin, Romania), Cretaceous Research, Volume 156, April 2024, 105810, doi: https://doi.org/10.1016/j.cretres.2023.105810
