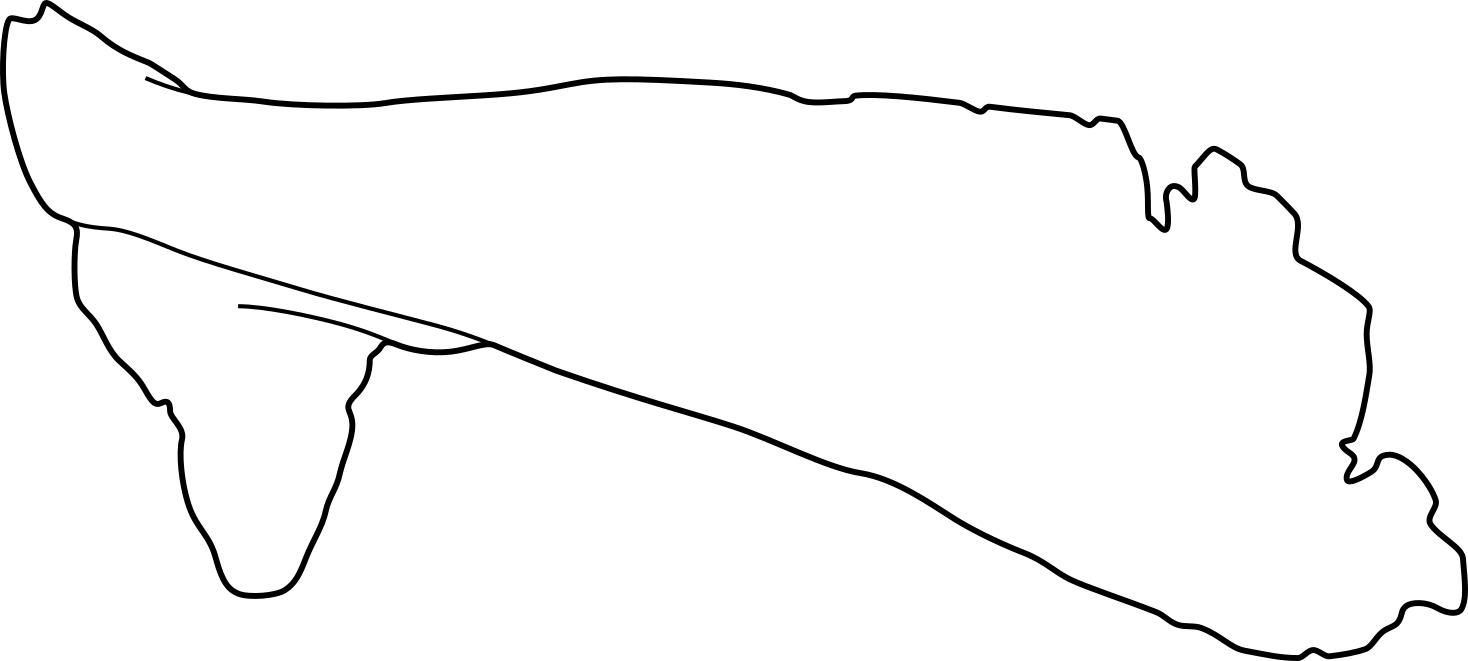
- Scapula of Pareisactus

Scientific classification
- Kingdom: Animalia
- Phylum: Chordata
- Class: Reptilia
- Clade: Dinosauria
- Clade: †Ornithischia
- Clade: †Ornithopoda
- Family: †Rhabdodontidae
- Genus: †Pareisactus; Párraga et al., 2019

Type species
- Pareisactus evrostos Párraga et al., 2019

= Pareisactus =

Pareisactus Temporal range: Late Cretaceous, lower Maastrichtian

Extinct genus of reptiles

Pareisactus (from the Greek "pareisaktos", meaning "intruder", referring to being represented as a single element among hundreds of hadrosaurid bones) is a genus of rhabdodontid ornithopod dinosaur from the Late Cretaceous (lower Maastrichtian) Conquès Member of the Tremp Formation in the Southern Pyrenees of Spain. The type and only species is P. evrostos, known only from a single scapula.
