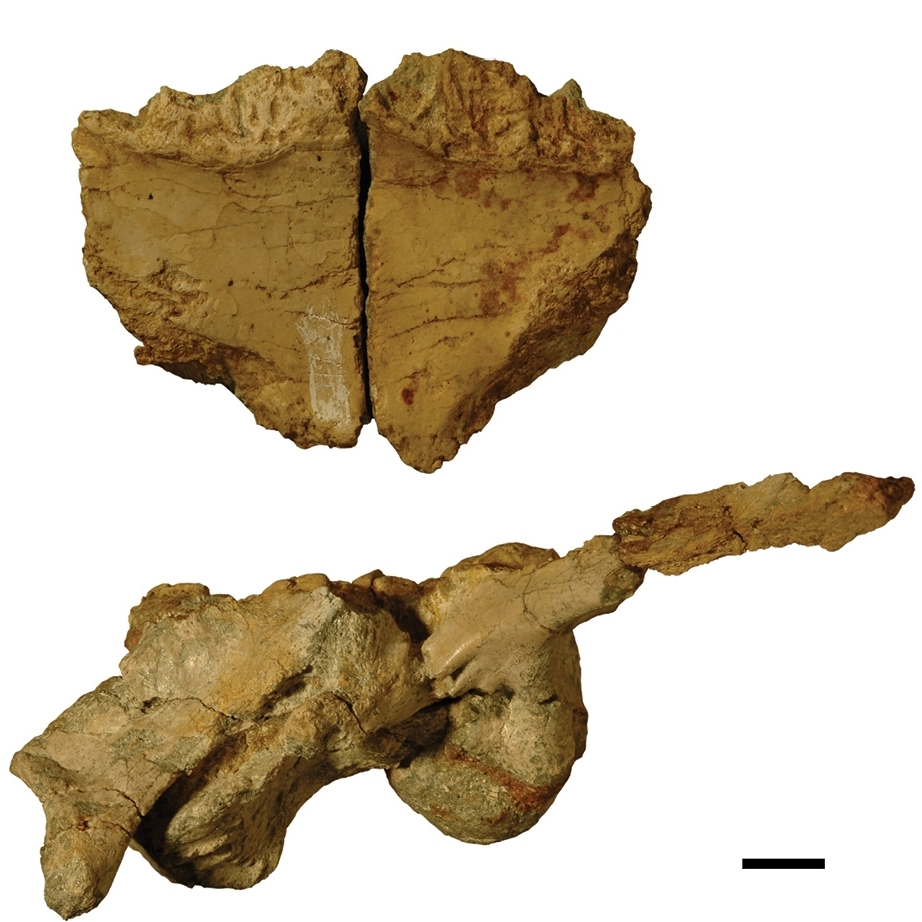
- Holotype specimen

Scientific classification
- Kingdom: Animalia
- Phylum: Chordata
- Class: Reptilia
- Clade: Dinosauria
- Clade: †Ornithischia
- Clade: †Ornithopoda
- Family: †Rhabdodontidae
- Genus: †Transylvanosaurus; Augustin et al., 2022
- Species: †T. platycephalus

Binomial name
- †Transylvanosaurus platycephalus Augustin et al., 2022

= Transylvanosaurus =

Transylvanosaurus Temporal range: Late Cretaceous, Maastrichtian

Extinct genus of ornithopod dinosaurs

Transylvanosaurus (meaning "lizard from across the forest") is an extinct genus of rhabdodontid ornithopod dinosaur from the Late Cretaceous (Maastrichtian) Hateg Basin of Romania. The type species is Transylvanosaurus platycephalus, known from a fragmentary skull.

== Discovery and naming ==
The holotype specimen, LPB (FGGUB) R.2070, was found in 2007 in the 'Pui Beds' in the Bărbat River Valley section of Haţeg Basin, Hunedoara County, Romania. This locality is dated to the middle Maastrichtian age of the Late Cretaceous period. It consists of a fragmentary skull, including the articulated basicranium and articulated frontals.

In 2022, Transylvanosaurus platycephalus was described as a new genus and species of rhabdodontid ornithopod dinosaurs by Felix J. Augustin, Dylan Bastiaans, Mihai D. Dumbravă, and Zoltán Csiki-Sava based on these remains. The generic name, "Transylvanosaurus", is derived from the Latin words "trans", meaning "across" and "silva", meaning "forest", and the Greek word "sauros", meaning "lizard" (σαύρος). The generic name references Transylvania, the region that contains the type locality of the genus in the Haţeg Basin . The specific name, "platycephalus", combines the Greek words "platys" (πλατύς), meaning wide, and "kephale" (κεφαλῇ), meaning head, in reference to the unusual width of the skull compared to related taxa.

== Classification ==
In their phylogenetic analyses, Augustin et al. (2022) recovered Transylvanosaurus as a member of the Rhabdodontidae, in an unresolved polytomy with most other rhabdotontids. Despite these results, the authors proposed especially close relationships to Rhabdodon based on morphological comparisons. The cladogram below displays the results of their phylogenetic analyses.

- Rhabdodontomorpha
  - Muttaburrasaurus
  - Rhabdodontidae
    - Rhabdodon
    - - Transylvanosaurus
      - Mochlodon vorosi
      - Mochlodon suessi
      - Zalmoxes shqiperorum
      - Zalmoxes robustus
