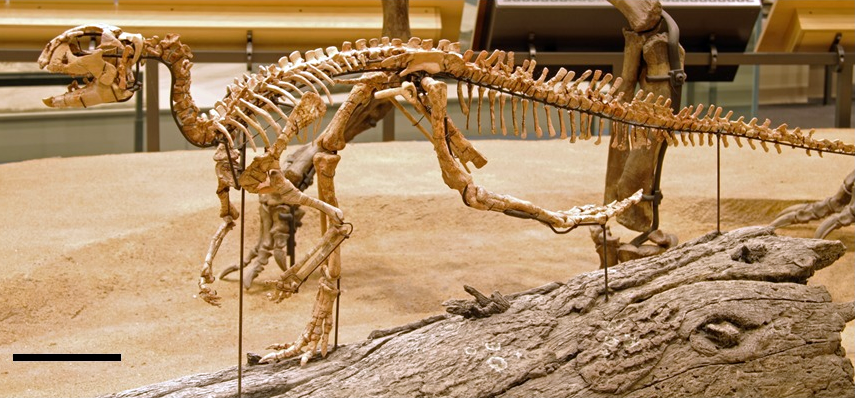
- Composite skeleton in Perot Museum of Nature and Science

Scientific classification
- Kingdom: Animalia
- Phylum: Chordata
- Class: Reptilia
- Clade: Dinosauria
- Clade: †Ornithischia
- Clade: †Ornithopoda
- Genus: †Convolosaurus; Andrzejewski, Winkler & Jacobs, 2019

Type species
- †Convolosaurus marri Andrzejewski, Winkler & Jacobs, 2019

= Convolosaurus =

Convolosaurus Temporal range: Early Cretaceous, Aptian 125 Ma

Extinct genus of dinosaurs

Convolosaurus (/ˌkɒnvələˈsɔːrəs/, meaning "flocking lizard" after the concentration of juvenile fossils found) is a genus of basal ornithopod dinosaur from the Twin Mountains Formation from Proctor Lake in Comanche County, Texas. The type and only species is Convolosaurus marri.

== Discovery and naming ==
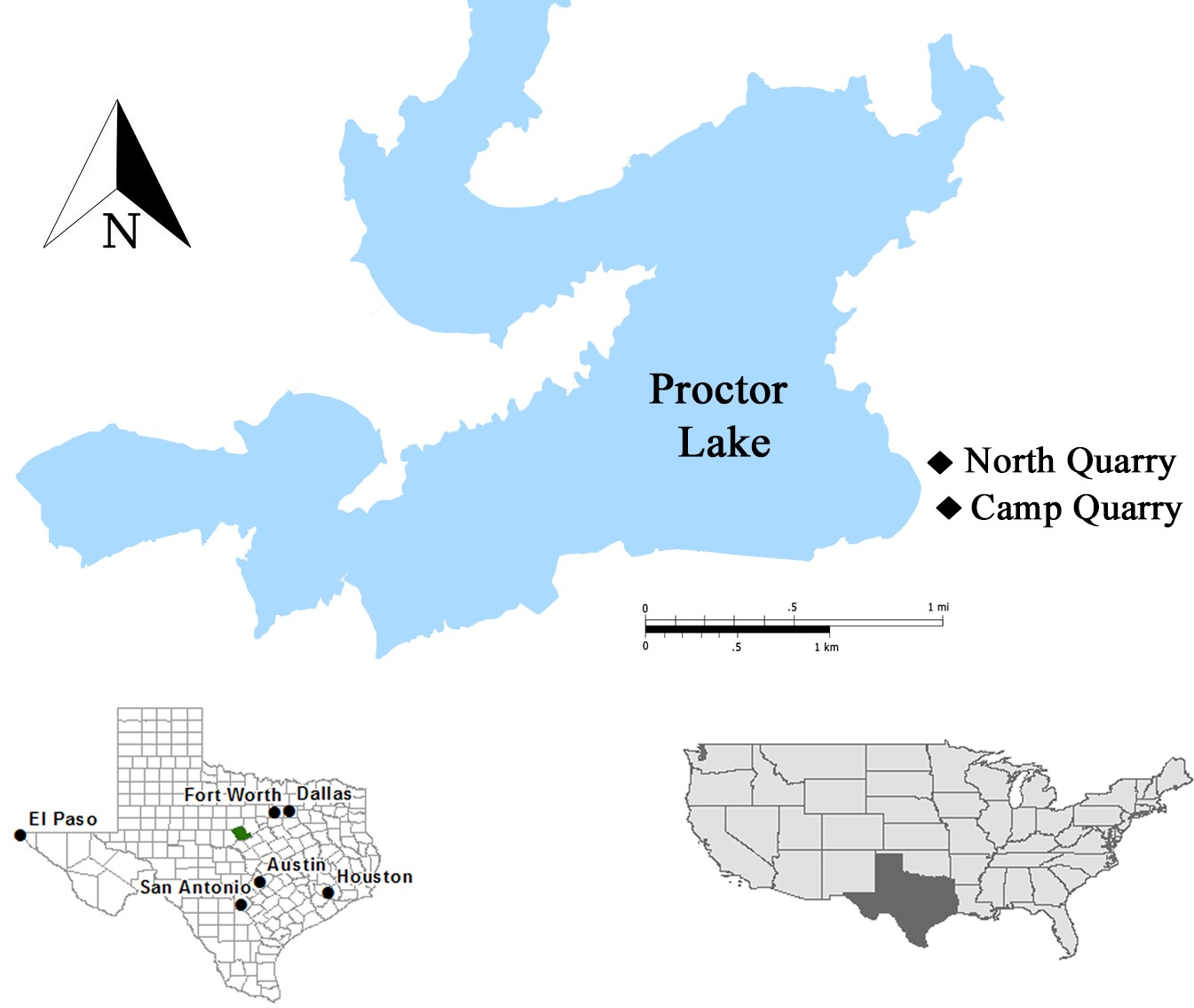
Maps showing location of fossils

In May 1985, James "Rusty" Branch at the Proctor Lake in Comanche County, Texas, discovered a dinosaur fossil site which was among the richest from the Lower Cretaceous of North America. The Shuler Museum of Paleontology, part of the Southern Methodist University at Dallas, excavated a large number of specimens on the southeastern bank of the lake, in the Camp Quarry and the North Quarry. The discovery was in 1988 reported in the scientific literature. Remains found were combined into three mounted skeletons displayed at respectively the Proctor Lake US Army Corps of Engineers Office at Proctor (based on specimen SMU 70456), the Perot Museum of Nature and Science, (a composite of specimens SMU 74087, SMU 74093 and SMU 74104), and the Fort Worth Museum of Science and History (based on specimen SMU 74663). The taxon, new to science, was informally indicated as the "Proctor Lake hypsilophodontid". Later it was understood that the Hypsilophodontidae are an invalid paraphyletic grouping.

In 2019, the type species Convolosaurus marri was named and described by Kate A. Andrzejewski, Dale A. Winkler and Louis Leo Jacobs. The generic name is derived from the Latin convolare, "to flock", a reference to the dense concentration of fossils. The specific name honours Dr. Ray H. Marr who has propagated the Society of Vertebrate Paleontology at the SMU.

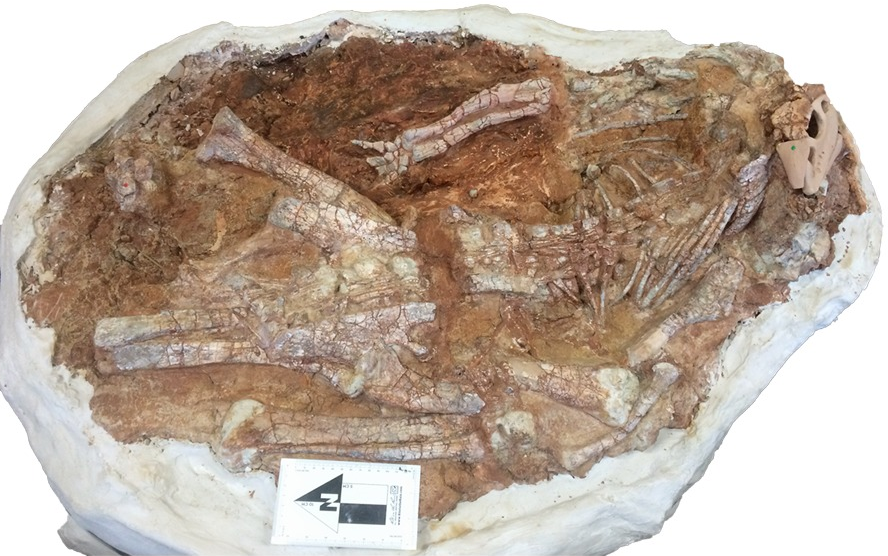
Articulated specimen SMU 70456

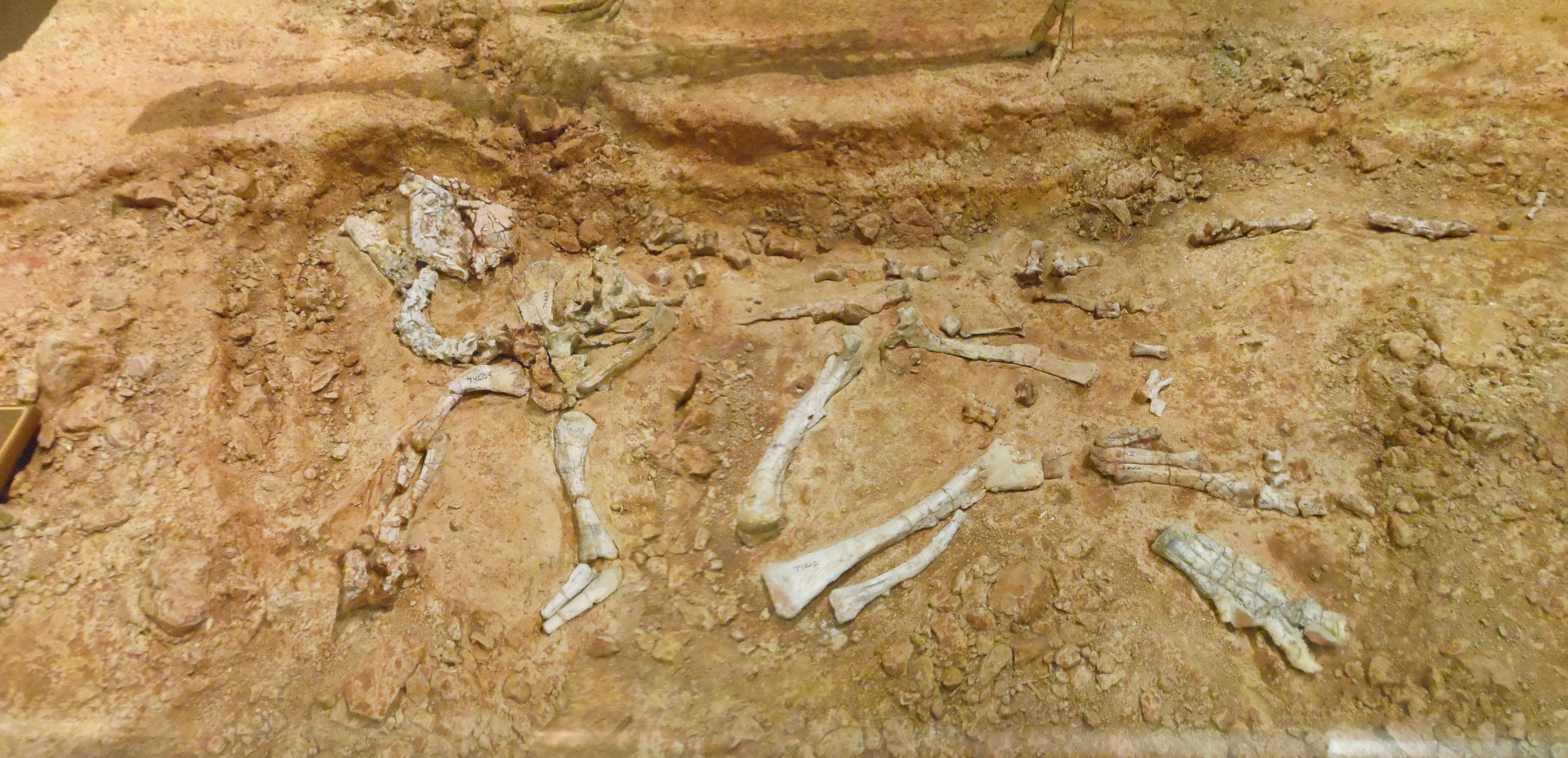
Reconstruction of Convolosaurus skeleton as found, Perot Museum of Nature and Science.

The holotype, SMU 72834, was found in a layer of the Twin Mountains Formation dating from the Aptian. It consists of a partial skeleton with skull. It preserved the cranium with the lower jaws, the vertebral column up to the twenty-third tail vertebra, the shoulder girdle, the left arm, the right humerus, the pelvis, both thighbones, both shinbones and the left calfbone. It represents a subadult individual. A large amount of fossils have been referred to the species. In 2019 these amounted to 488 specimens, representing at least twenty-nine individuals, ranging from small juveniles to subadults. Almost the entire skeleton is now known.

== Description ==
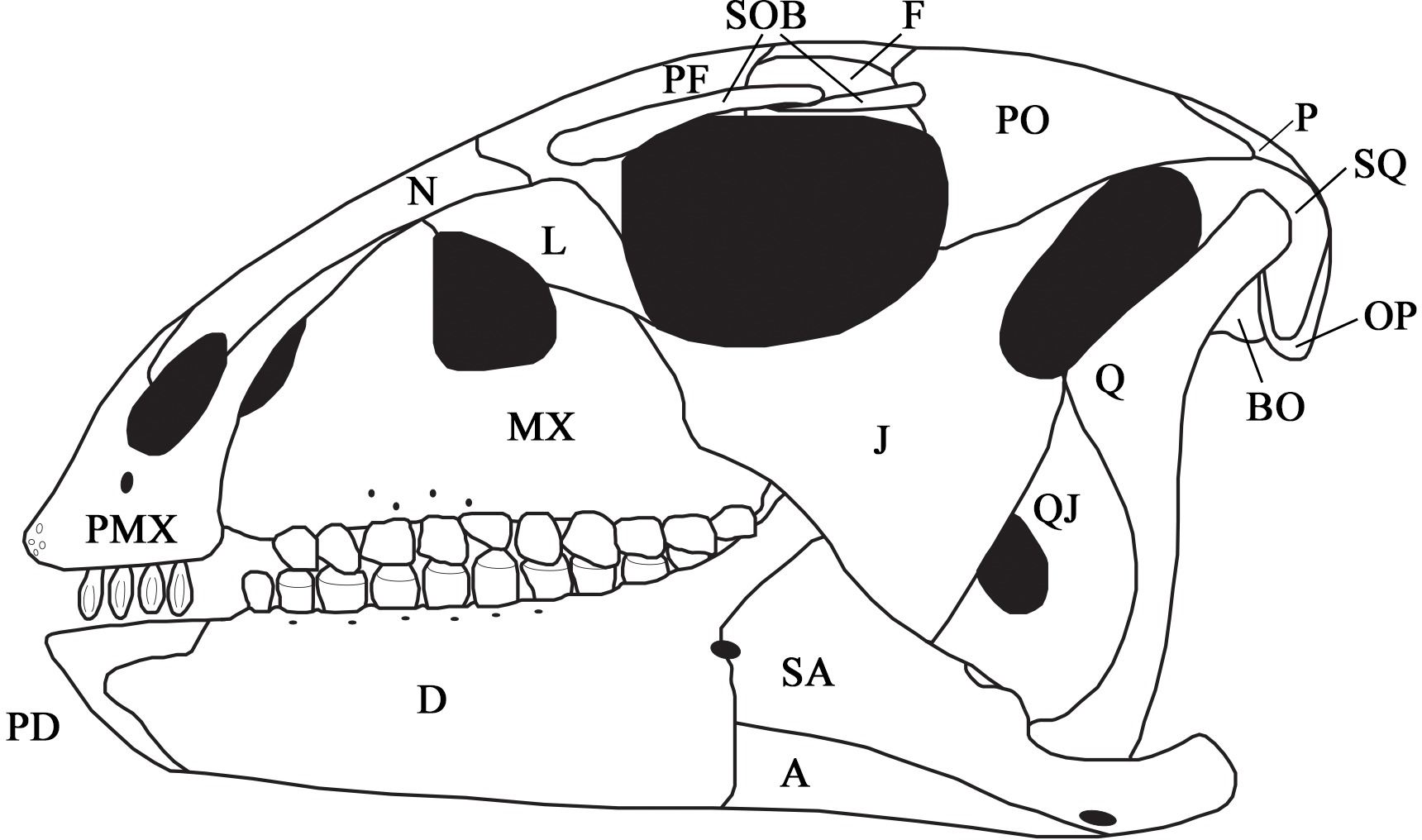
Skull reconstruction

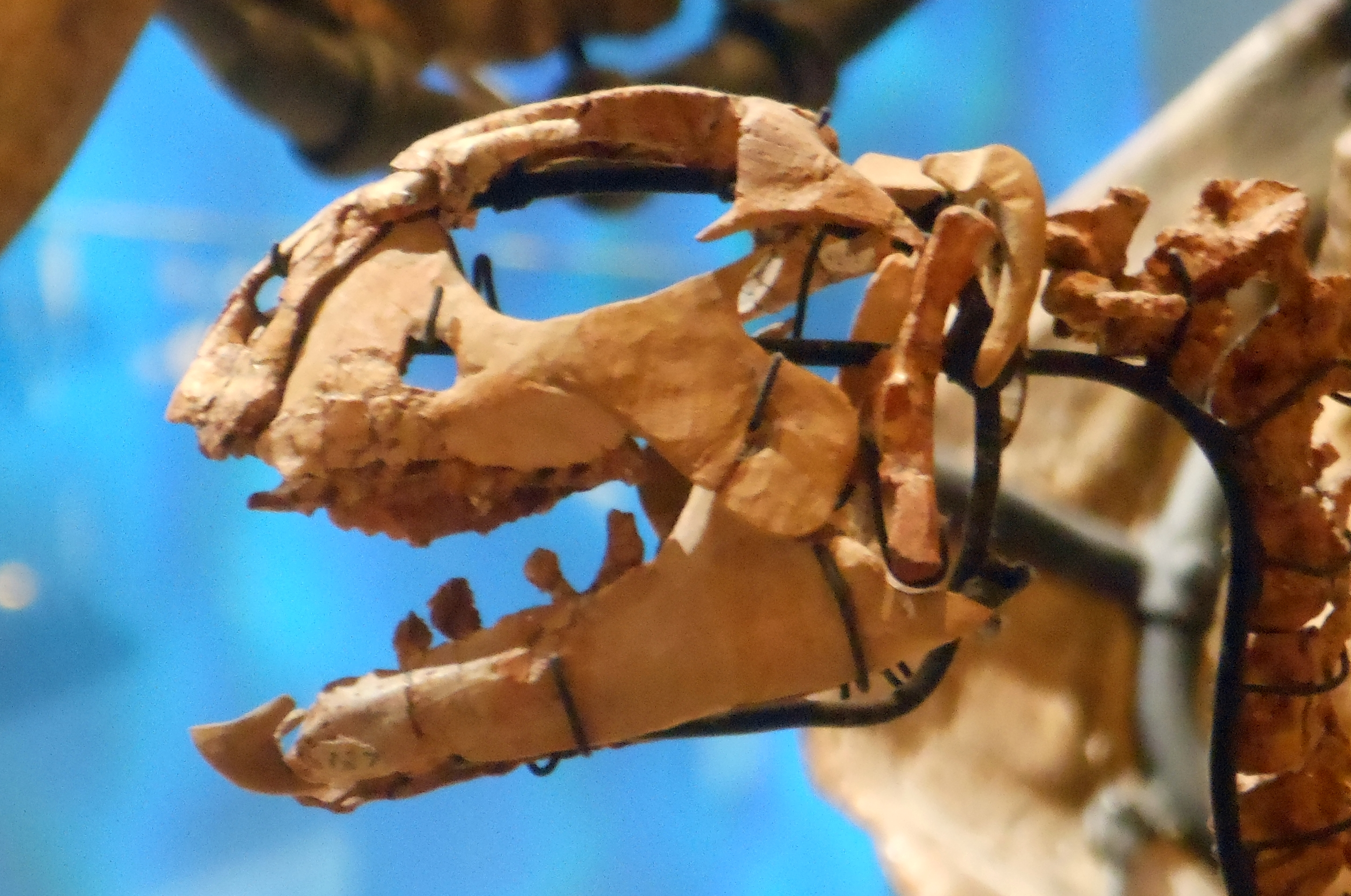
Skull of Convolosaurus. The premaxillae are missing

The holotype individual had an estimated length of between 2.5 and 3 metres (8.2 and 9.8 ft). It was not yet fully grown, so the adult size was considered to be unknown. The thighbones vary between 5.1 and 31.5 centimetres (2.0 and 12.4 in) in length.

The describing authors established a number of distinguishing traits. One of these is an autapomorphy, a unique derived character. The premaxilla bears four teeth, which have a vertical trough on the outside.

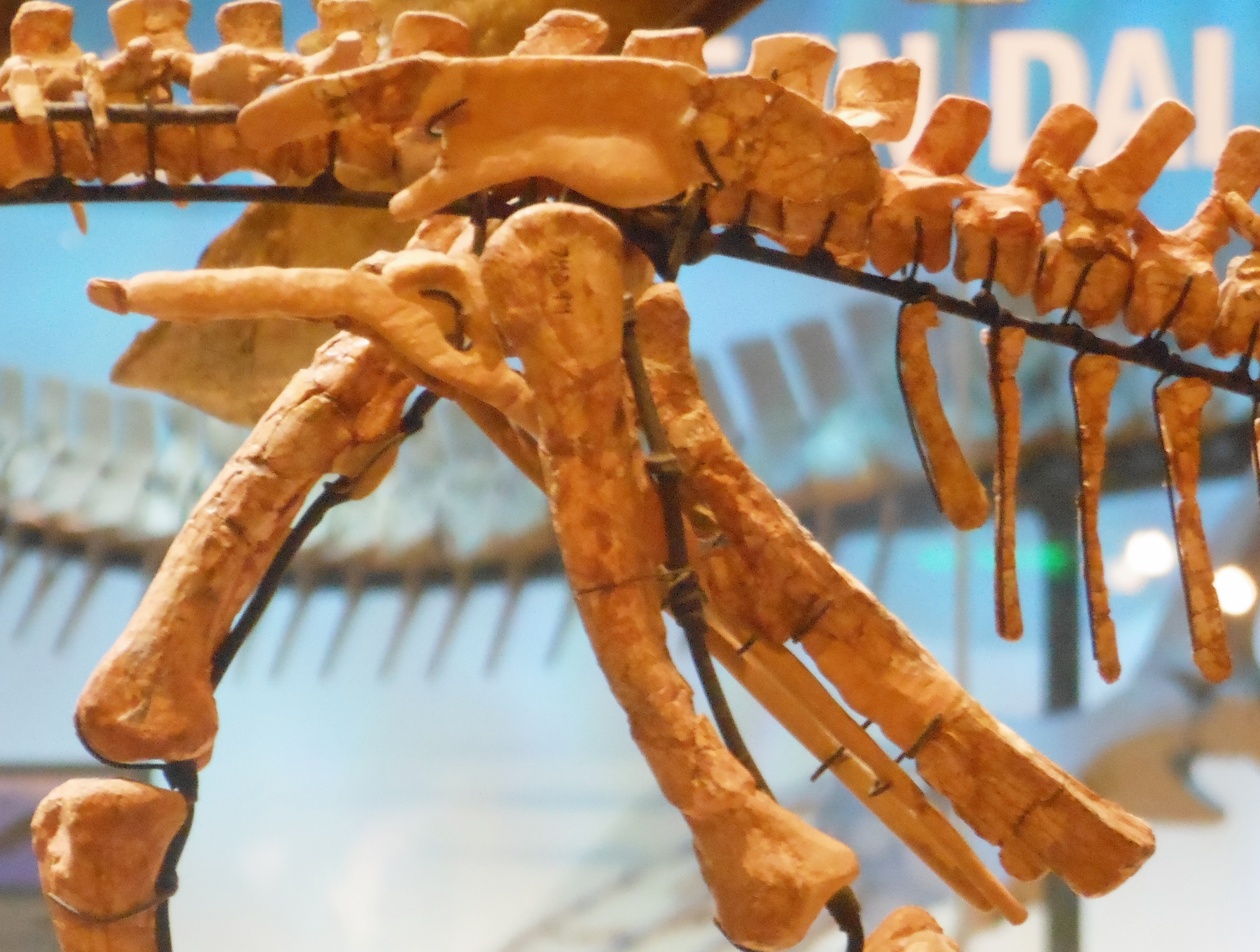
Reconstructed pelvis of Convolosaurus

Additionally, a unique combination of traits is present that in themselves are not unique. Some of these traits are basal or symplesiomorphies. The premaxilla bears teeth. The entire upper rim of the eye socket is covered by two supraorbitals. Other traits are derived characters, indicating a position higher in the evolutionary tree. The roots of the maxillary teeth are curved. The neck vertebrae are opisthocoelous, convex at the front and concave at the rear. With the sacral vertebrae the neural spines have twice the height of the vertebral body. The rear end of the ischium is expanded into a "foot". Between the fronts of the condyles of the thighbone only a shallow groove is present. The prepubic process of the pubic bone is transversely flattened.

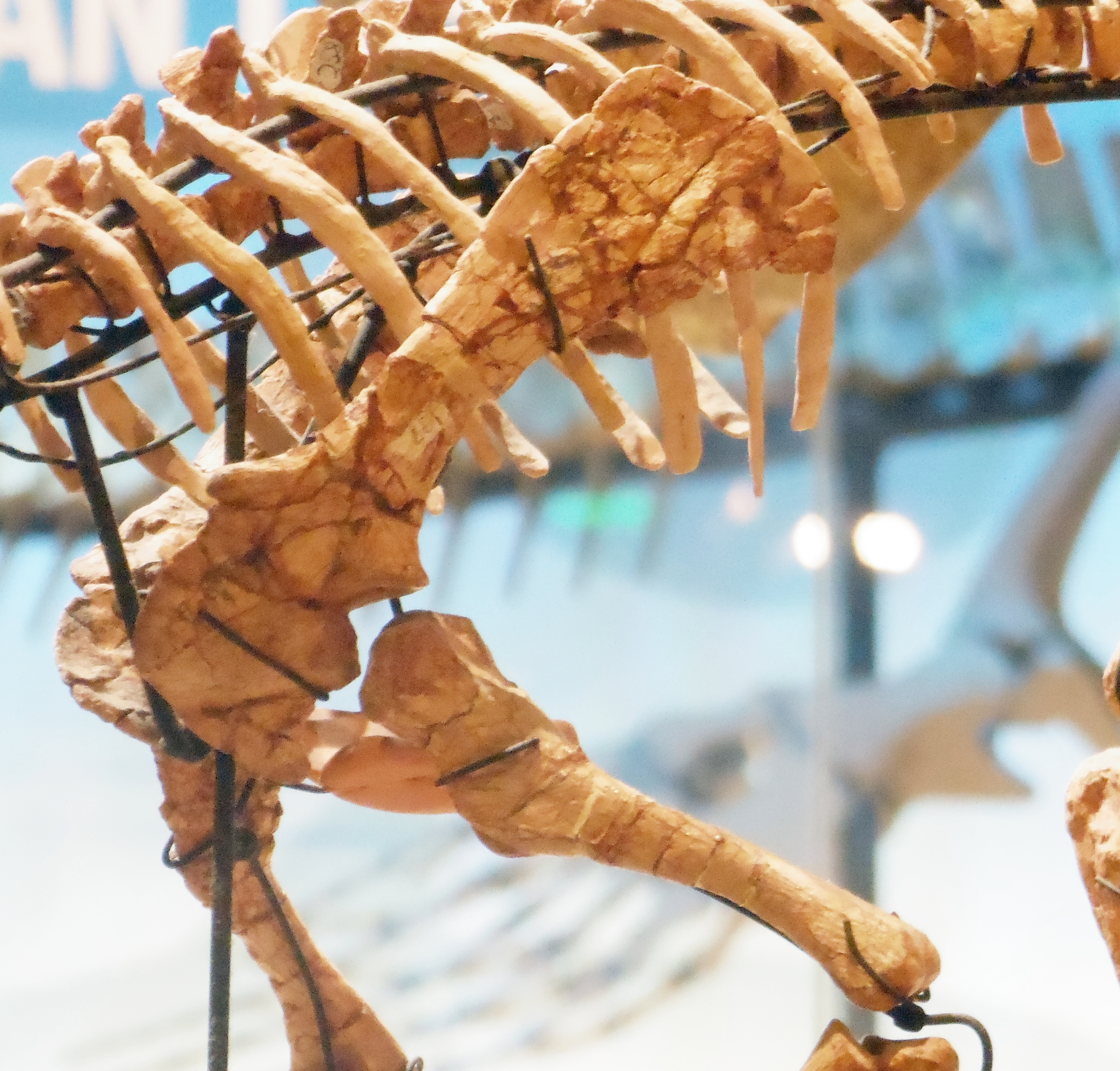
Reconstructed forelimb of Convolosaurus

== Phylogeny ==
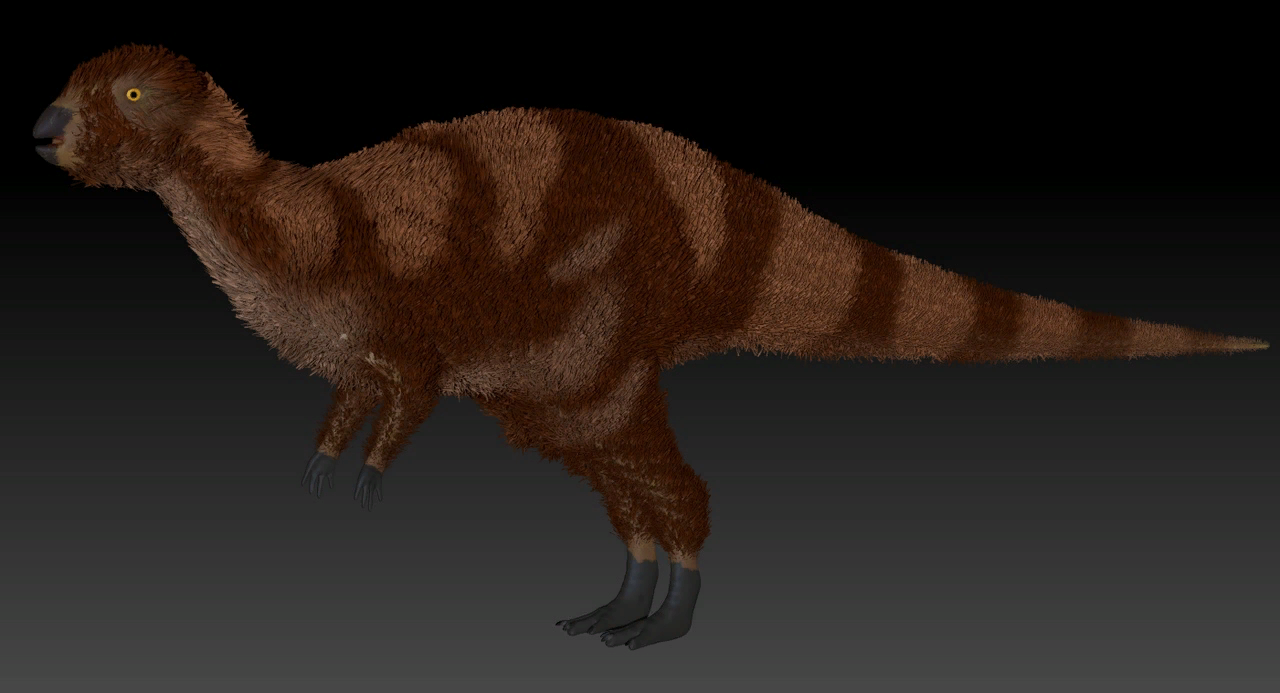
3D restoration of Convolosaurus marri

While initially considered a member of the Hypsilophodontidae, Convolosaurus was in 2019 placed in the Ornithopoda in a basal position, between Hypsilophodon and Thescelosaurus in the evolutionary tree. Previous analyses had found Thescelosaurus to be more basal than Hypsilophodon but this was now reversed as Convolosaurus possessed two supraorbitals that it shared with Thescelosaurus, indicating that Hypsilophodon had lost this trait independently.

The cladogram below results from analysis by Andrzejewski et al., 2019.

- Ornithischia
  - Pisanosaurus
  - - Eocursor
    - Heterodontosauridae
    - - Lesothosaurus
      - Thyreophora
      - Neornithischia
        - Agilisaurus
        - - Hexinlusaurus
          - - Othnielosaurus
            - Cerapoda
              - Marginocephalia
              - Ornithopoda
                - - Zephyrosaurus
                  - Orodromeus
                - - - Haya
                    - - Jeholosaurus
                      - Changchunsaurus
                  - - Hypsilophodon
                    - - Convolosaurus
                      - - Thescelosaurus
                        - - Talenkauen
                          - - Parksosaurus
                            - Gasparinisaura
                          - Iguanodontia
                            - Rhabdodontidae
                            - - Dryomorpha
                                - Ankylopollexia
                                - Dryosauridae
                              - Tenontosaurus
