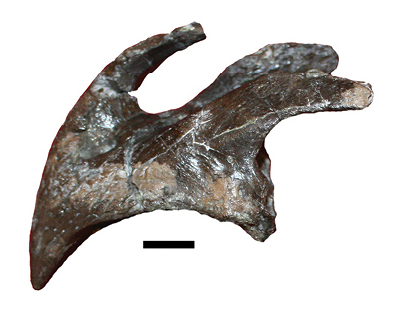
- Holotype proposed rostral fused with premaxillae

Scientific classification
- Kingdom: Animalia
- Phylum: Chordata
- Class: Reptilia
- Clade: Dinosauria
- Clade: †Ornithischia
- Clade: †Ceratopsia
- Genus: †Ajkaceratops; Ősi et al., 2010
- Species: †A. kozmai

Binomial name
- †Ajkaceratops kozmai Ősi et al., 2010

Synonyms
- Mochlodon vorosi Ősi et al., 2012

= Ajkaceratops =

Ajkaceratops Temporal range: Santonian ~85 Ma

Extinct genus of dinosaurs

Ajkaceratops (pronounced "oi-ka-sera-tops") is a genus of ceratopsian dinosaur described in 2010. It lived during the Late Cretaceous in the western Tethyan archipelago, in what is now Europe. The type species, A. kozmai, was originally described as a ceratopsian most closely related to forms in east Asia, from where its ancestors may have migrated by island-hopping. Later research, however, questioned this assignment and treated Ajkaceratops as an ornithischian of unresolved affinity. In 2026, more complete cranial remains referable to the species were described, supporting its placement as a ceratopsian.

== Discovery ==
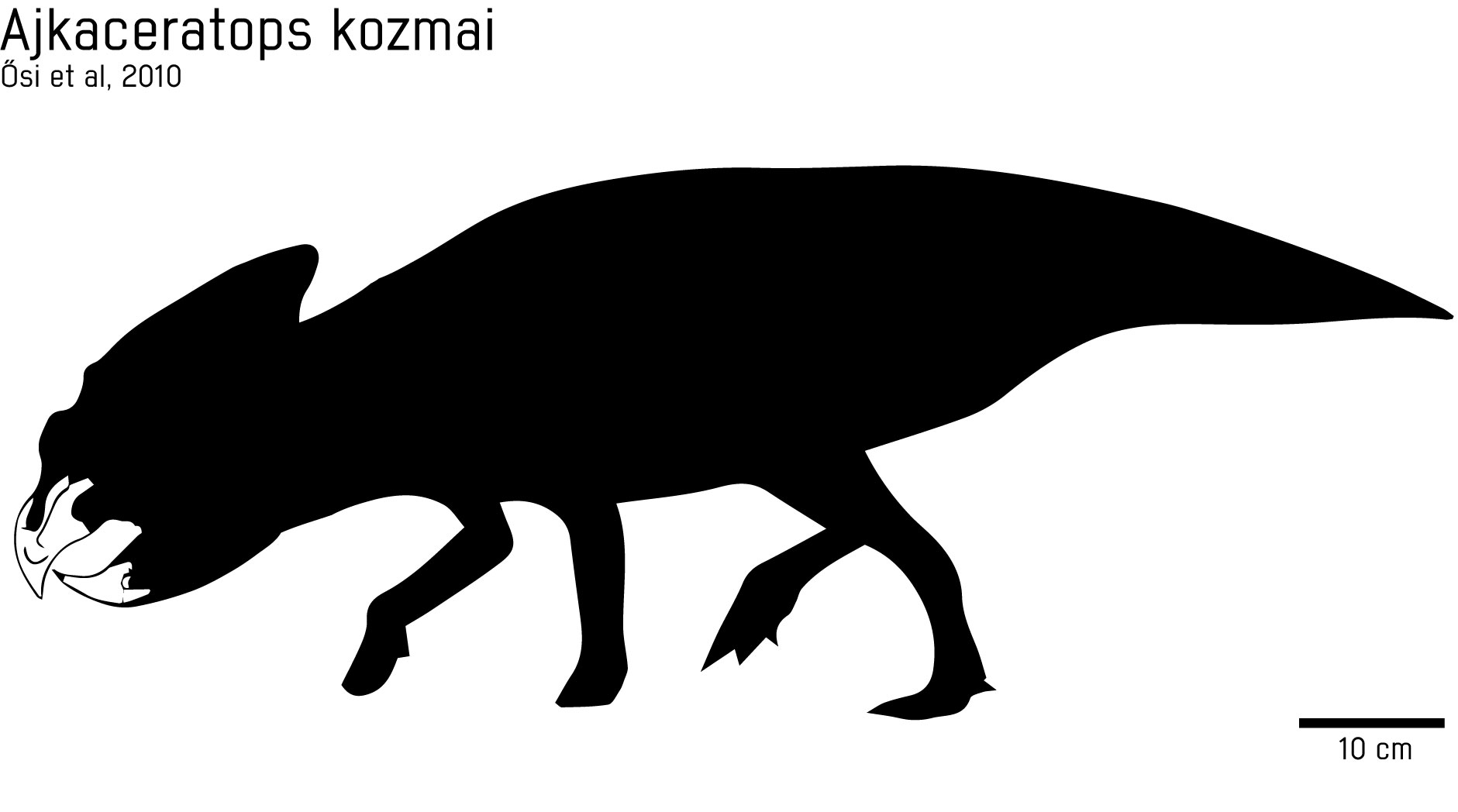
Skeletal reconstruction showing first known material

The holotype, cataloged as MTM V2009.192.1, consists only of a few skull fragments, including snout with proposed rostral bone, fused premaxillae, and maxillae fragments (beak and jaw fragments). These fossils are kept in the Hungarian Natural History Museum, in Budapest. The generic name, Ajkaceratops, honors Ajka, a town in Hungary where the fossils were first discovered, combined with the given greek nomination ceratops, meaning "horned face". The specific name, "kozmai", honors Károly Kozma.

== Description ==
Although the fossils are fragmentary, the paper describing Ajkaceratops estimated a body length of 1 m (3.3 ft). Other material includes four predentary bones, cataloged as MTM V2009.193.1, V2009.194.1, V2009.195.1, and V2009.196.1; these are also believed to have belonged to Ajkaceratops, although they are proportionately smaller, and probably came from other individuals of the genus. It is possible that Ajkaceratops lacked the frill and horns seen in other ceratopsians.

== Classification ==
When first described, the fossils were stated to most closely resemble those of the Asian protoceratopsid Bagaceratops. Those similarities indicate Ajkaceratops is a ceratopsian related to the protoceratopsids, but more primitive than the Zuniceratops and the Ceratopsidae.

However, later research questioned this referral. The proposed rostral bone of Ajkaceratops differs markedly from the rostral morphology of other ceratopsians, possessing a sub-circular cross-section, pitted texture instead of grooves, and a lack of lateral slicing edges. Furthermore, the proposed rostral bone appears to have fully fused with the premaxilla, a feature that is only seen in the ontogenetically oldest members of derived ceratopsids. This has cast doubt as to whether Ajkaceratops possesses a rostral bone in the first place, a defining feature of the ceratopsian group, and instead the hooked beak represents a highly derived, hypertrophied premaxilla. While there is the possibility Ajkaceratops is a highly unique ceratopsian, it was referred to as an enigmatic ornithischian of uncertain affinities by the authors. In a redescription of the cranial anatomy of the Early Cretaceous neornithischian Jeholosaurus, Bertozzo et al. (2025) tested the phylogenetic position of Ajkaceratops based on the premaxilla reinterpretation and recovered it as a sister taxon to Changmiania, implying a position as a basal ornithopod.

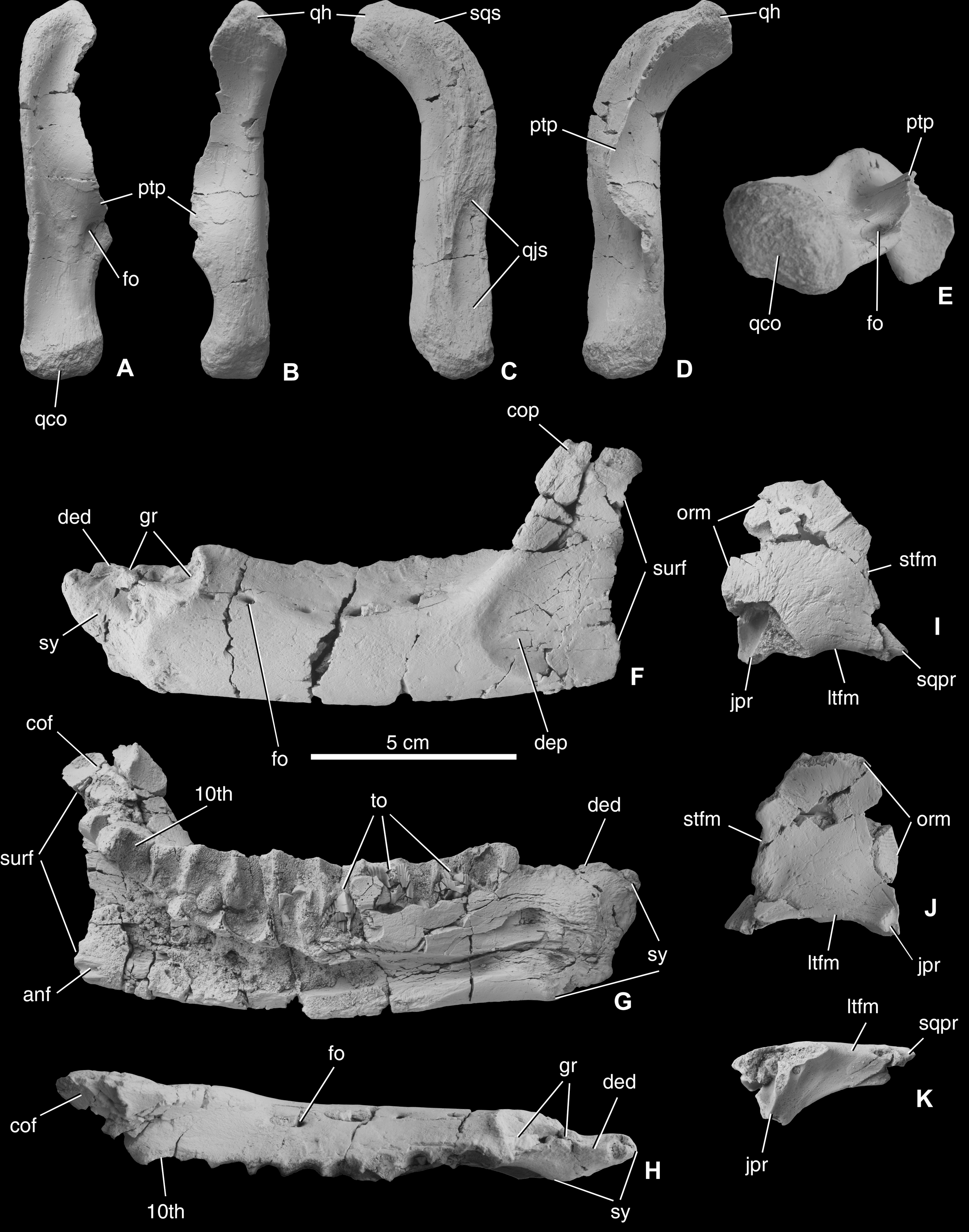
Fossils originally identified as Mochlodon vorosi, considered a junior synonym in 2026

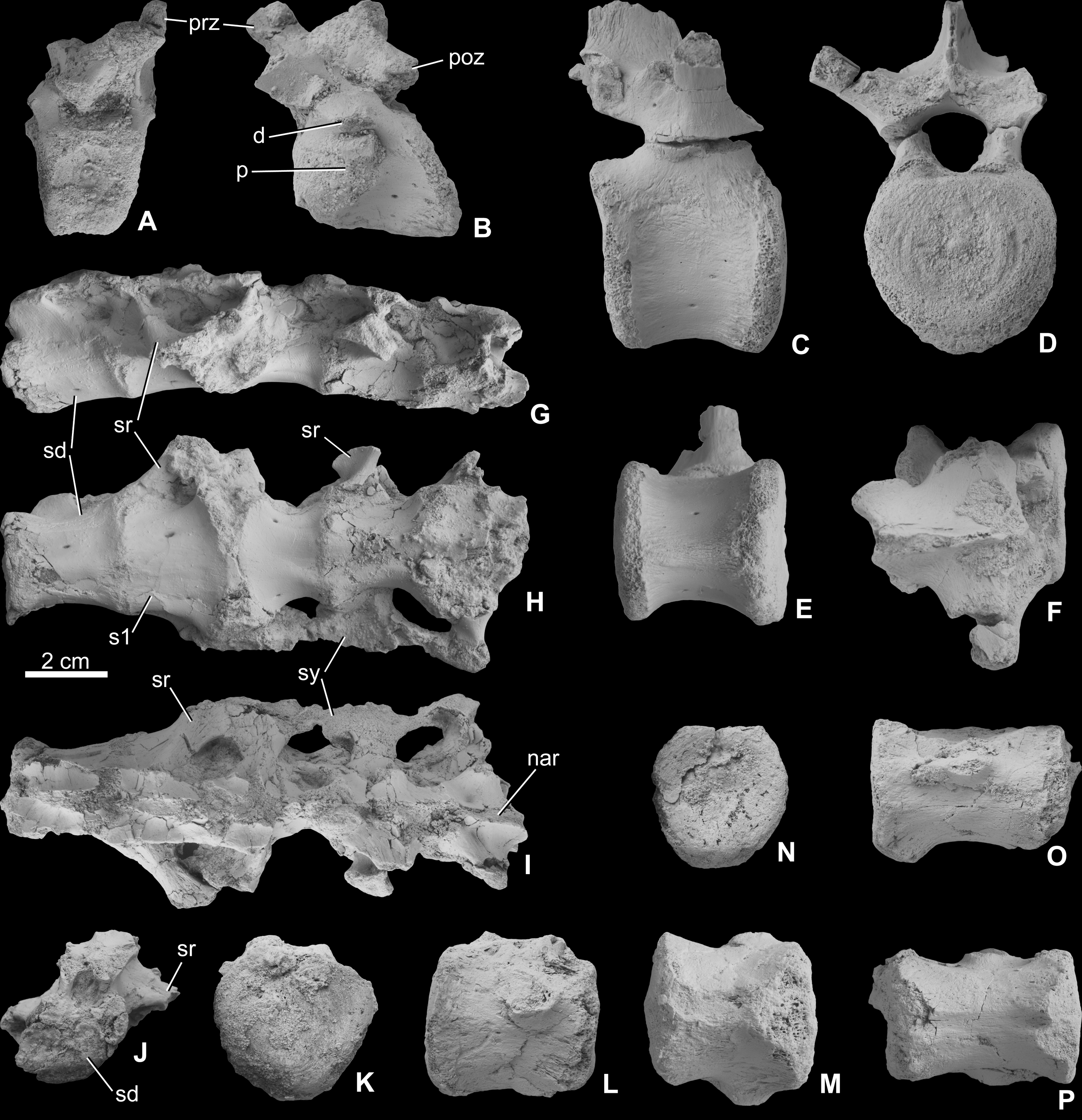
Vertebrae

In 2026, Susannah Maidment and colleagues described MTM 2025.1.1, a new specimen referable to Ajkaceratops from the type locality in the Csehbánya Formation, comprising a much more complete skull. Using these new remains, the authors supported a position for this genus as a ceratopsian. They further reinterpreted "Mochlodon" vorosi—known from a dentary found in the same geologic formation as Ajkaceratops—as a junior synonym of the latter. "Zalmoxes" shqiperorum, previously regarded as a 'rhabdodontid', was reinterpreted as a ceratopsian closely related to Ajkaceratops and given the new genus name Ferenceratops. In some versions of their phylogenetic analyses, Zalmoxes robustus, the type species of that genus, was retained as an ornithopod, including the implied weighting analysis, which recovered a poorly-resolved Ceratopsia but better resolution for early-diverging lineages and ornithopods. Using a Bayesian analysis, Ceratopsia was better resolved, with Ajkaceratops, Ferenceratops, and Zalmoxes forming a distinct clade as the sister taxon to one including Zuniceratops, Turanoceratops, and the more derived Ceratopsidae. These results are displayed in the cladogram below:

- Neoceratopsia
  - Liaoceratops yanzigouensis
  - - Aquilops americanus
    - - Archaeoceratops oshimai
      - - Auroraceratops rugosus
        - - Yamaceratops dorngobiensis
          - - Leptoceratops gracilis
            - Mosaiceratops azumai
            - - Protoceratops andrewsi
              - - Bagaceratops rozhdestvenskyi
                - - - Ajkaceratops kozmai
                    - - Ferenceratops shqiperorum
                      - Zalmoxes robustus
                  - - Zuniceratops christopheri
                    - - Turanoceratops tardabilis
                      - Ceratopsidae

== Palaebiology ==
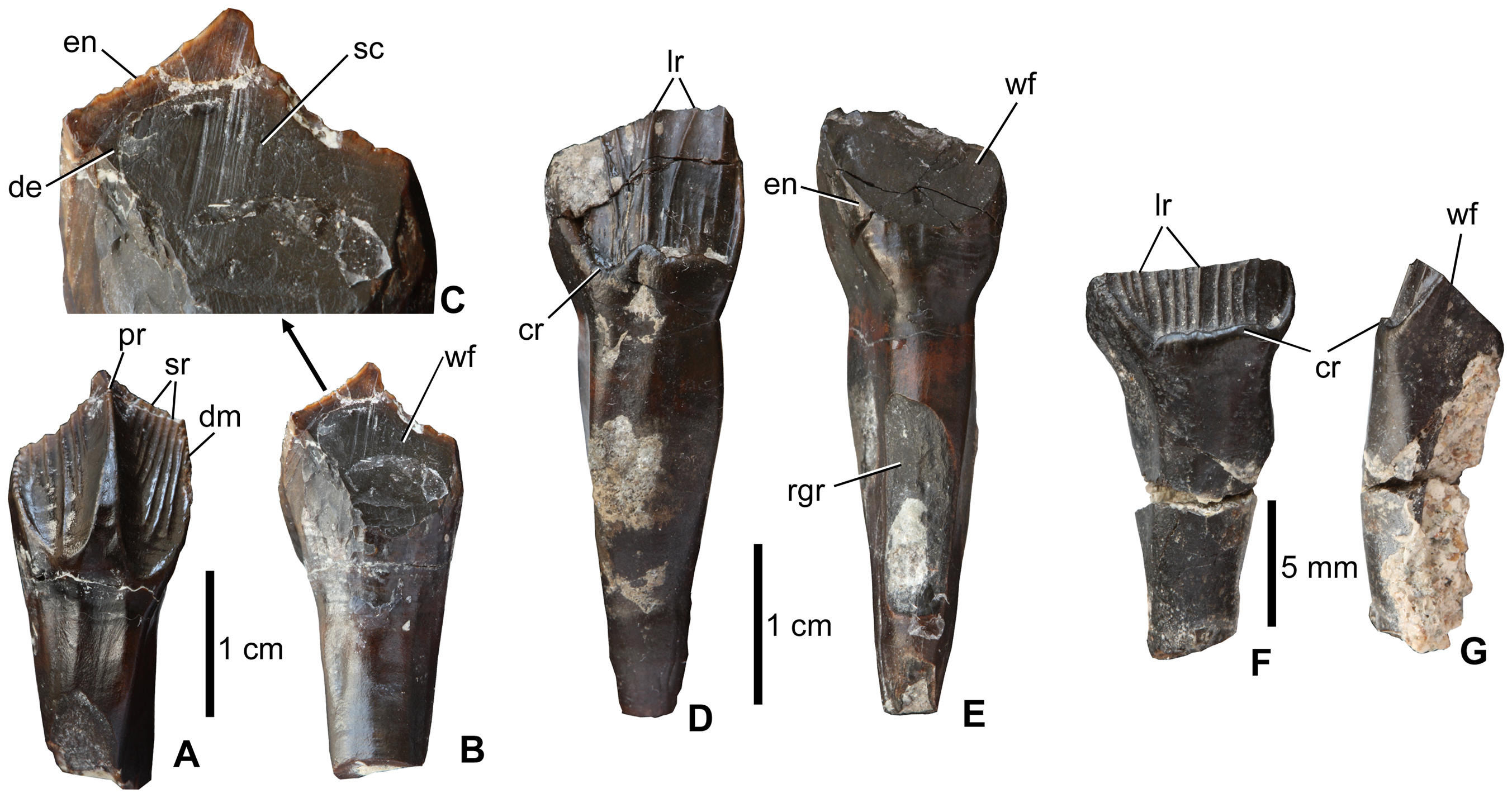
Teeth formerly assigned to M. vorosi

Ajkaceratops masticated circumpalinally. Based on analysis of its tooth wear patterns, Ajkaceratops (M. vorosi at the time of the study) partitioned resources with the contemporary ankylosaur Hungarosaurus by eating tougher vegetation than the latter, as its crowns wore down at more than twice the rate of the crowns of the thyreophoran.

== Palaeoenvironment ==
The fossils of Ajkaceratops were discovered in the Csehbánya Formation, which is interpreted as a floodplain and channel deposit formed by variegated clay, silt with interbedded grey and brown sand, and sandstone beds. This strata dates to the Santonian stage, around 86 to 84 million years ago. Ajkaceratops shared its environment with other dinosaurs such as Mochlodon, the nodosaurid ankylosaurs, other non-avian theropods and enantiornithine birds, as well as eusuchian crocodiles, azhdarchid pterosaurs, bothremydid turtles and teiid lizards.

== See also ==
- Timeline of ceratopsian research
- 2010 in paleontology
- Haţeg Island
