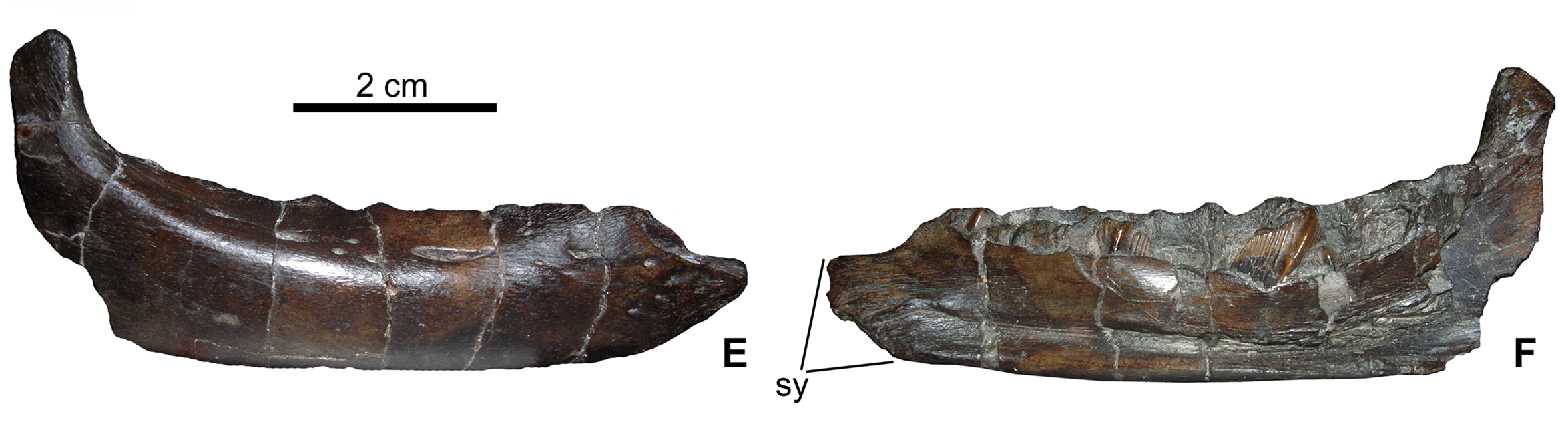
- M. suessi lectotype dentary

Scientific classification
- Kingdom: Animalia
- Phylum: Chordata
- Class: Reptilia
- Clade: Dinosauria
- Clade: †Ornithischia
- Clade: †Ornithopoda
- Family: †Rhabdodontidae
- Genus: †Mochlodon; Seeley, 1881

Type species
- †Iguanodon suessi Bunzel, 1871

Species
- †M. suessi Seeley, 1881

Synonyms
- Iguanodon suessii Bunzel, 1871; Oligosaurus Seeley 1881; Ornithomerus Seeley 1881

= Mochlodon =

Mochlodon Temporal range: Santonian-Campanian ~85–80 Ma

Extinct genus of dinosaurs

Mochlodon is a genus of rhabdodontid dinosaurs from the Late Cretaceous of Austria and Hungary. It lived during the Late Cretaceous (85-80 Ma) and two species have been named, M. suessi and M. vorosi, although the latter has been regarded as a junior synonym of the ceratopsian Ajkaceratops.

== Discovery and species ==
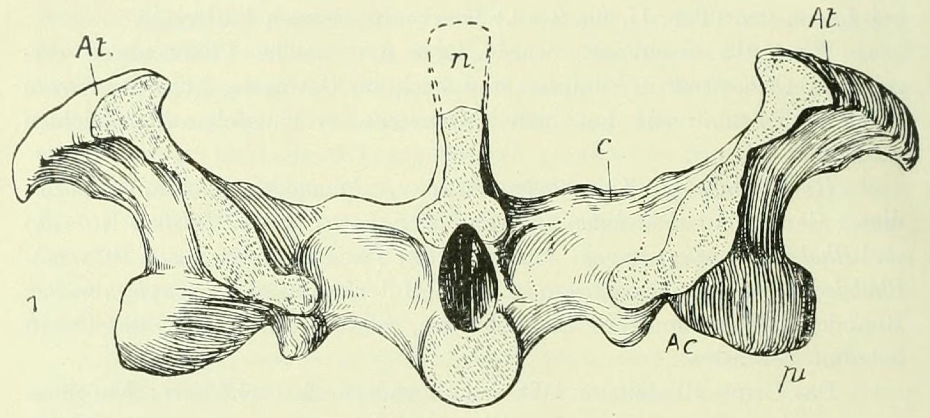
M. suessi sacrum figured by Nopsca in 1915

In 1859 coal mine administrator Pawlowitsch notified the University of Vienna that some fossils had been found in the Gute Hoffnung mine at Muthmannsdorf in Austria. A team headed by geologists Eduard Suess and Ferdinand Stoliczka subsequently uncovered numerous bones of several species, among them those of a euornithopod dinosaur. Stored at the university museum, the finds remained undescribed until they were studied by Emanuel Bunzel from 1870 onwards. Bunzel in 1871 named the euornithopod a new species of Iguanodon: Iguanodon suessii. The specific name honours Suess and is today more often spelled suessi. In 1881 Harry Govier Seeley named a separate genus: Mochlodon. The generic name is derived from Greek mokhlos, "bar", and odon, "tooth", a reference to the bar-like median ridge on the teeth. The type species is Mochlodon suessi. Mochlodon and Struthiosaurus, the latter found at the same site, are so far the only dinosaur genera named from Austrian finds.

The type specimen PIUW 2349 was found in the Grünbach Formation of the Gosau Group dating from the Lower Campanian, about 80 million years old. It consists of a dentary, two vertebrae (presently lost), a parietal, a scapula, an ulna, a manual ungual, a femur and a tibia. Bunzel did not assign a holotype. In 2005 the dentary was chosen as the lectotype.

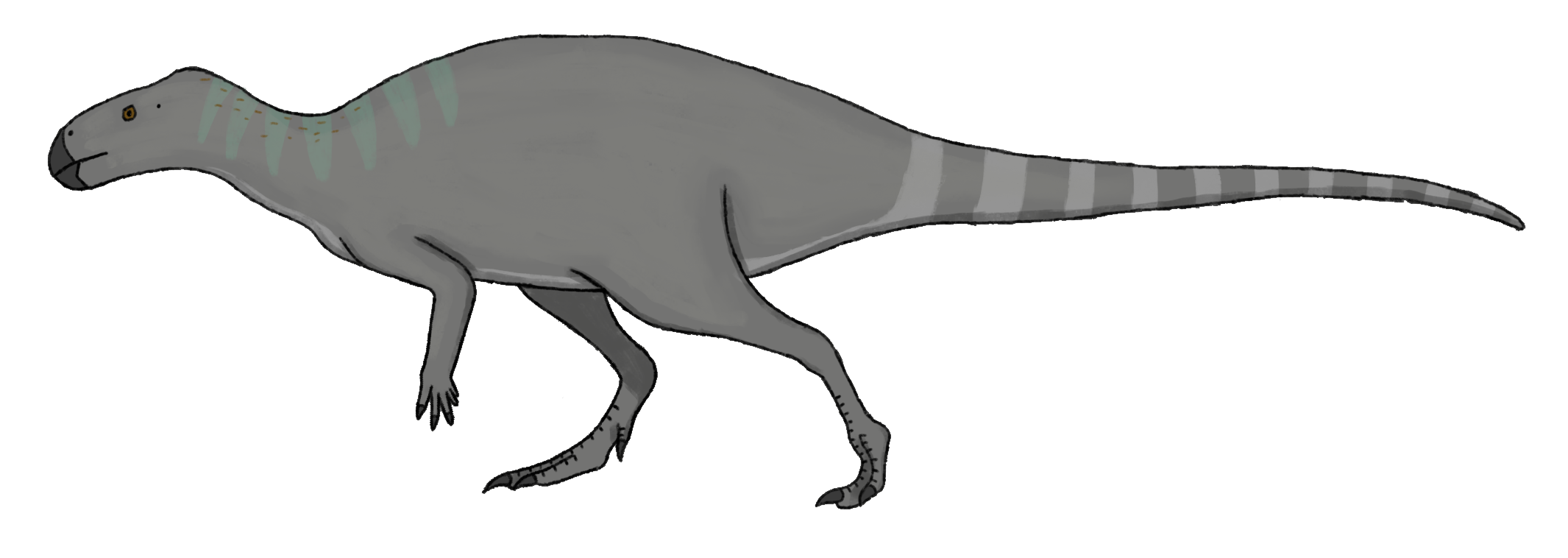
Speculative life restoration of M. suessi

At the end of the nineteenth century Baron Franz Nopcsa noted the similarity of fossils found in Romania to both the French Rhabdodon and the Austrian Mochlodon. In 1899 he named some of these Mochlodon inkeyi, the specific name honouring Béla Inkey, but the same year changed the name into Rhabdodon inkeyi. In 1900 Nopcsa named some Romanian remains Mochlodon robustum (emended to M. robustus in 1990 by George Olshevsky). In 1915 however, he concluded that all this material could be referred to Rhabdodon, the Austrian remains to Rhabdodon priscus. In later years, Mochlodon was often considered a nomen dubium. In 2003, when M. robustus was renamed Zalmoxes, Mochlodon was tentatively reinstated as a separate genus for the species Mochlodon suessi. In 2005 a study concluded that no unique derived features, autapomorphies, could be established for Mochlodon in relation to Zalmoxes, assigning the Austrian remains provisionally to a Zalmoxes sp.; a definite identification would give Mochlodon nomenclatural priority.

A second species, M. vorosi, was described from the Santonian aged Csehbánya Formation of Hungary in 2012. In 2026, Maidment and colleagues reassessed this species in the context of new cranial remains of the coeval Ajkaceratops, and concluded that the M. vorosi material represented the same taxon as Ajkaceratops. As such, the former species is a junior synonym of the latter, with the material representing a ceratopsian dinosaur.
