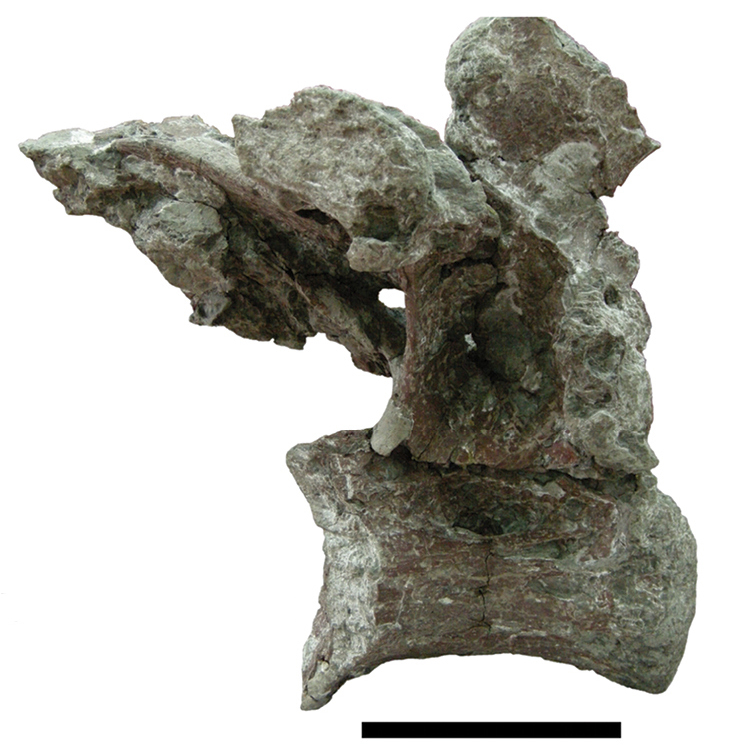
- Dorsal vertebra UBB NVM1-43

Scientific classification
- Kingdom: Animalia
- Phylum: Chordata
- Class: Reptilia
- Clade: Dinosauria
- Clade: Saurischia
- Clade: †Sauropodomorpha
- Clade: †Sauropoda
- Clade: †Macronaria
- Clade: †Titanosauria
- Clade: †Eutitanosauria
- Genus: †Paludititan; Csiki et al., 2010
- Species: †P. nalatzensis

Binomial name
- †Paludititan nalatzensis Csiki et al., 2010

= Paludititan =

Paludititan Temporal range: Late Cretaceous (Maastrichtian), 70.6–66 Ma

Extinct genus of dinosaurs

Paludititan is a genus of titanosaurian sauropod dinosaur which lived in the area of present Romania during the Late Cretaceous. It existed in the island ecosystem known as Hațeg Island.

== Discovery and naming ==
In 2002, a Belgian-Romanian expedition uncovered a sauropod skeleton in the bed of the river Râul Mare, at Nălațvad. It was at the time the most complete sauropod skeleton ever discovered in Romania. In 2010, the type species Paludititan nalatzensis was named and described by Zoltán Csiki, Vlad Codrea, Cătălin Jipa-Murzea and Pascal Godefroit. The generic name is derived from Latin palus, "marsh" and Greek Titan. The specific name refers to its finding place Nălațvad.

The holotype, UBB NVM1, was found in the Hațeg Basin, in a silty mudstone layer of the Sânpetru Formation, dating from the early Maastrichtian. It consists of a partial skeleton lacking the skull. It contains three dorsal vertebrae, at least nine caudal vertebrae, twelve chevrons, the right half of the pelvis, a left ischium, the lower end of the right thighbone, and two toe claws. The remains were not found in articulation but in such close association that it is likely they represent a single individual.

The describing authors of Paludititan considered the possibility that the skeleton was a specimen of Magyarosaurus dacus, a coeval titanosaurian sauropod sharing the same habitat. Overlapping remains were identical. On the other hand, they did not show any shared unique traits, synapomorphies, and M. dacus is known from a different location. They felt justified to name a separate taxon, pending further discoveries.

== Description ==
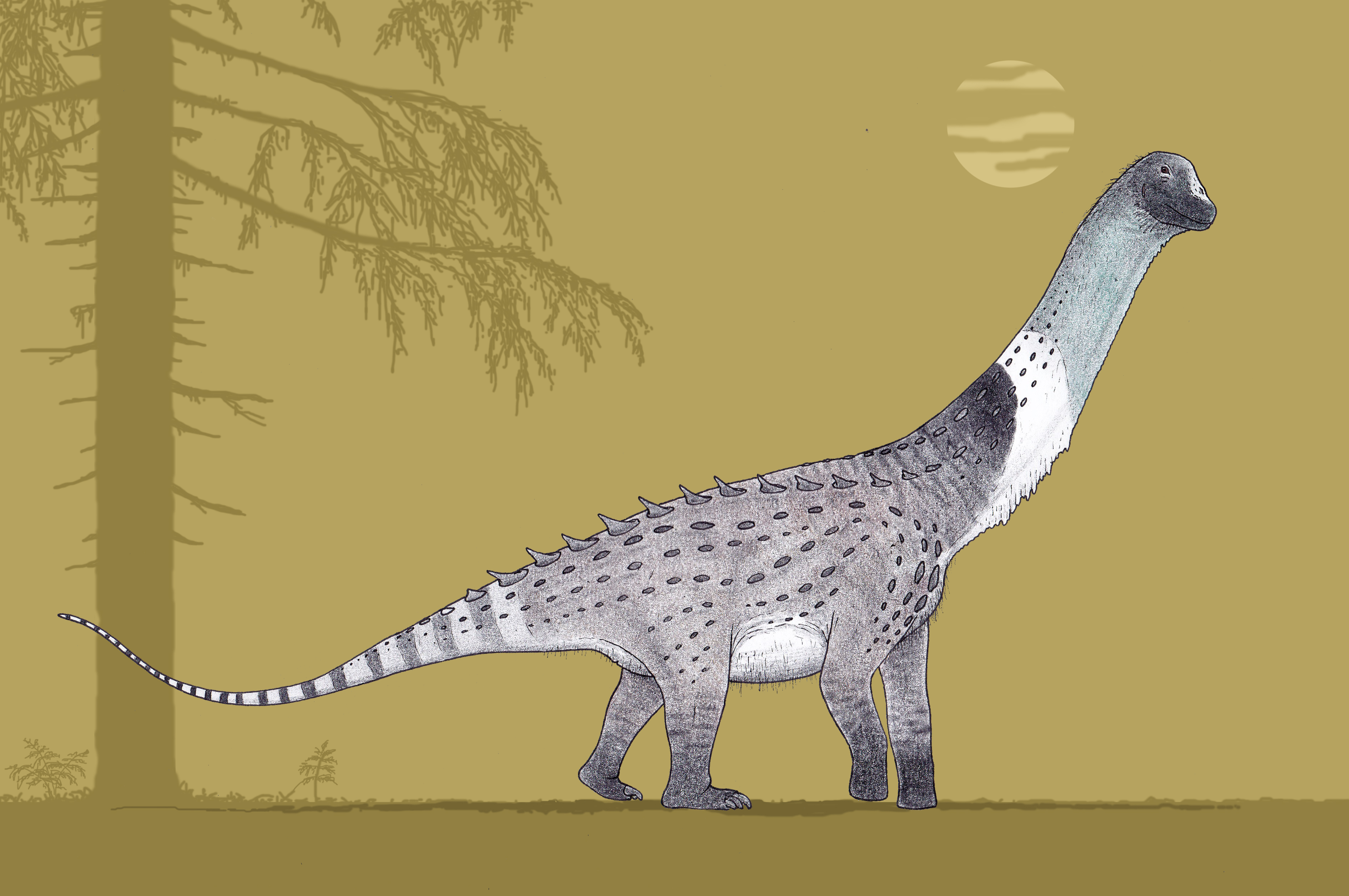
Life restoration

Paludititan was a relatively small sauropod, reaching 6 metres (20 ft) in length and 1 metric ton (1.1 short tons) in body mass. The fossil remains show some unique features, autapomorphies, which demonstrate that P. nalatzensis is a species distinct from comparable titanosaurians. In the rear vertebrae of the back, the top of the lamina centrodiapophysealis anterior, the front ridge on the underside of the lateral process, obliquely curving to the front and above runs parallel to the top of the lamina centrodiapophysealis posterior, the rear ridge, instead of touching it. In the vertebrae of the tail base and the first vertebrae of the middle tail, the neural spines, while being short and erect, possess a conspicuous corner on their front rim, projecting to the front. The peduncle of the ischium, touching the ilium, has a conspicuous triangular process at the outer upper rear, forming a buttress that overlaps the ischial pedicel of the ilium. While vertebrae of the tail base and the first vertebrae of the middle tail are procoelous, thus with a concave front facet of the vertebral centre, some middle tail vertebrae more to the rear are amphiplatous, with flat front and rear facets; but they are again followed by procoelous middle tail vertebrae. When the species was described, the paleontologists are believed that this feature is autapomorphic for Paludititan, however, some vertebrae found in 2019 in the vicinity of a village called Valiora, found to certainly not belong to Paludititan, also show this feature, so it can no longer be considered as an autapomorphy of Paludititan.

== Evolutionary relationships ==
Paludititan was placed in 2010 in the Titanosauria. More precisely, it was considered a probable member of the Lithostrotia. Cladistic analysis suggested it was a sister species of the South American Epachthosaurus. More recently, Mocho et al. (2019) in a cladistic analysis, recovered Paludititan within Lithostrotia as a sister species of the European species Lohuecotitan.

- Lithostrotia
  - Malawisaurus
  - - - Paludititan
      - Lohuecotitan
    - - Epachthosaurus
      - - - Opisthocoelicaudiinae
            - Alamosaurus
            - Opisthocoelicaudia
        - - - Saltasaurinae
              - Neuquensaurus
              - - Rocasaurus
                - Saltasaurus
          - - - Lirainosaurinae
                - Lirainosaurus
                - - Atsinganosaurus
                  - Ampelosaurus
            - - Bonatitan
              - - - Rapetosaurus
                  - Nemegtosaurus
                - - Aeolosaurinae
                    - Gondwanatitan
                    - Aeolosaurus
                  - Rinconsauria
                    - Rinconsaurus
                    - - Muyelensaurus
                      - - Bonitasaura
                        - Lognkosauria
                          - Mendozasaurus
                          - Futalognkosaurus

In the same year, Gorscak & O'Connor (2019) in their description of Mnyamawamtuka recovered Paludititan as a saltasaurid.

- Titanosauria
  - - Karongasaurus
    - - - Argentinosaurus
        - - Andesaurus
          - Ligabuesaurus
      - - Jiangshanosaurus
        - - - Angolatitan
            - Malarguesaurus
          - - Chubutisaurus
            - Wintonotitan
  - - Tastavinsaurus
    - Lithostrotia
      - - Malawisaurus
        - Mnyamawamtuka
      - - Tapuiasaurus
        - - Normanniasaurus
          - - - - Rinconsaurus
                - - Isisaurus
                  - Rapetosaurus
              - - Muyelensaurus
                - - Bonitasaura
                  - - Gondwanatitan
                    - - - Panamericansaurus
                        - - Overosaurus
                          - Shingopana
                      - - Trigonosaurus
                        - - Aeolosaurus
                          - Argyrosaurus
            - - Diamantinasaurus
              - - Patagotitan
                - Saltasauridae
                  - - Paralititan
                    - - Maxakalisaurus
                      - - Neuquensaurus
                        - Saltasaurus
                  - - - Epachthosaurus
                      - - Futalognkosaurus
                        - - Mendozasaurus
                          - - Atsinganosaurus
                            - Notocolossus
                    - - Rukwatitan
                      - - - Lohuecotitan
                          - Nemegtosaurus
                        - - - Lirainosaurus
                            - Opisthocoelicaudia
                          - - - Ampelosaurus
                              - - Mansourasaurus
                                - Paludititan
                            - - Pellegrinisaurus
                              - - Dreadnoughtus
                                - - Alamosaurus
                                  - Baurutitan

== Paleoecology ==
Paludititan lived on the Cretaceous Hațeg Island with a diverse assemblage of animals, including other island dwarfs such as its relative Magyarosaurus, the hadrosaurid Telmatosaurus and the iguanodontian Zalmoxes. Other endemic dinosaurs include the nodosaurid Struthiosaurus, several small, fragmentary maniraptorans Bradycneme, Elopteryx, Heptasteornis, and the avialan Balaur. The top predator of the island ecosystem was the giant azhdarchid pterosaur Hatzegopteryx.
