= Hațeg Island =

Prehistoric island

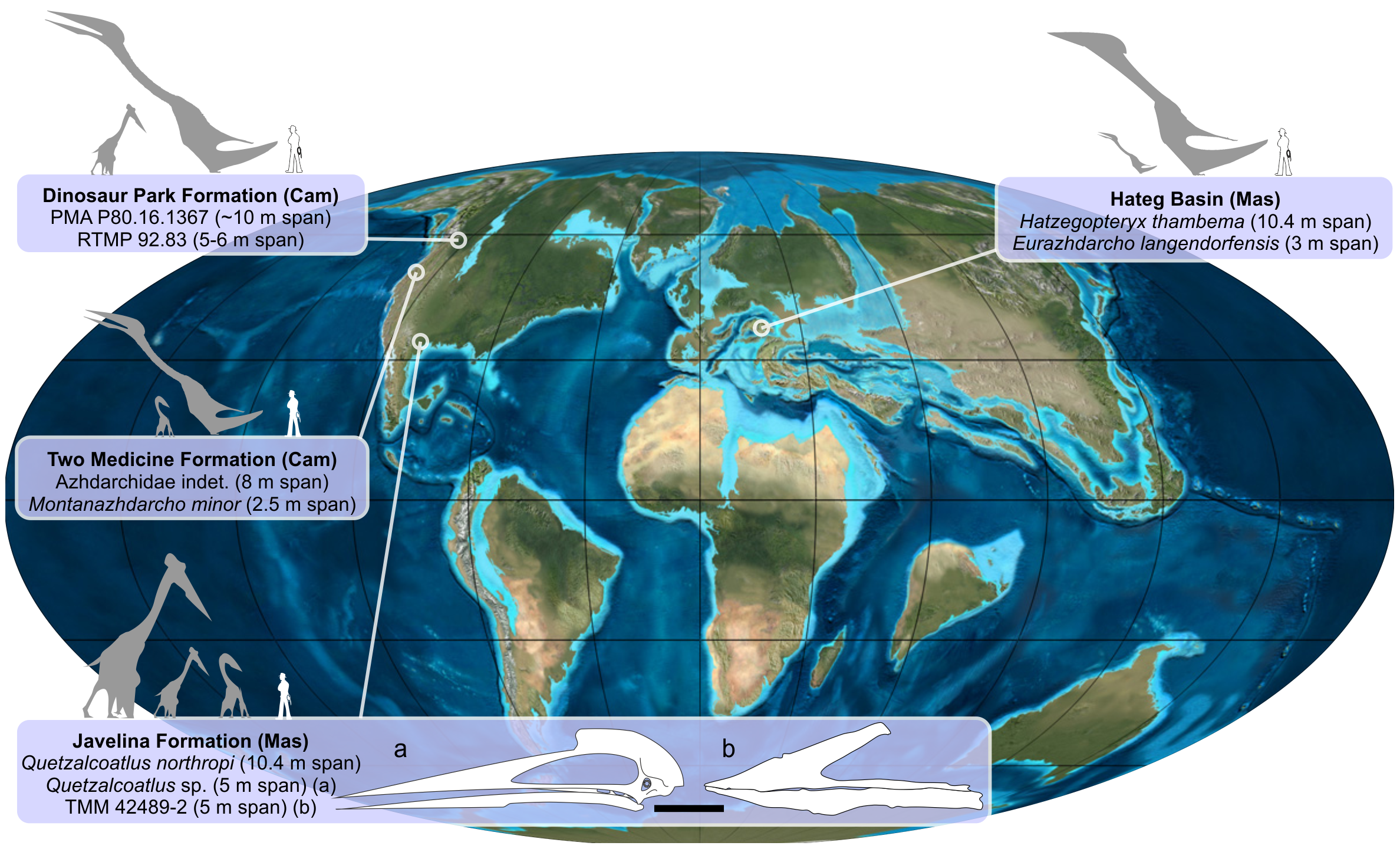
Map showing the location of four geological formations containing small-medium and giant-sized azhdarchids, including Hațeg Island.

Hațeg Island was a large offshore island in the Tethys Sea which existed during the Late Cretaceous period, probably from the Cenomanian to the Maastrichtian ages. It was situated in an area corresponding to the region around modern-day Hațeg, Hunedoara County, Romania. Maastrichtian fossils of small-sized dinosaurs have been found in the island's rocks. It was formed mainly by tectonic uplift during the early Alpine orogeny, caused by the collision of the African plate and Eurasian plate towards the end of the Cretaceous. There is no real present-day analog, but overall, the island of Hainan (off the coast of China) is perhaps closest as regards climate, geology and topography, though still not a particularly good match. The vegetation, for example, was of course entirely distinct from today, as was the fauna. Places like Louisiana and Mississippi and other parts of the American Deep South are an even closer climatic and ecological match with a subtropical climate, wet summer season, and coverage by rivers, swamps, and deltas, however they are not islands.

The Hungarian paleontologist Franz Nopcsa theorized that "limited resources" found on the island commonly have an effect of "reducing the size of animals" over the generations, producing a localized form of dwarfism. Nopcsa's theory of insular dwarfism—also known as the island rule—is today widely accepted.

== Geography ==
While a variety of estimates regarding the prehistoric island's size have been given over the years, the most reliable estimate places it at roughly 80,000 square kilometres (31,000 sq mi) during the Maastrichtian, or about the size of the modern island of Hispaniola. It was positioned just within the equatorial belt, at about 27°N latitude.

Hațeg Island was probably located at least 200 kilometres (120 mi) from the nearest land mass. To the northwest was an island corresponding to the Bohemian Massif, to the southeast was an island corresponding to the Balkan–Rhodope Massif (including the modern Rhodope Mountains region), and to the west was a large island corresponding to part of the modern Iberian land mass. The closest continental land mass were portions of the Austro-Alpine region to the west and the Adriatic region to the south.

Hațeg Island itself was surrounded primarily by a deep marine basin, unlike some of the surrounding islands and land masses which were surrounded by shallow seas.

== Climate and ecology ==
During the Maastrichtian, the climate of Hațeg Island was subtropical, with an average temperature of 20–25 °C (68–77 °F). The island experienced marked rainy and dry seasons, but despite this, the plant life on the island was mainly tropical in nature. Carbon isotopes indicate "dry woodland" conditions. This seeming contradiction between the seasonally dry climate and tropical plant species can be explained by the fact that tropical plants can thrive in a seasonally monsoonal environment today as long as they have access to sufficient amounts of water year-round, and the Hațeg environment seems to have been dominated by braided rivers and lakes. Fossils of fruit and angiosperms unearthed in this region are a testament to this. Early rock layers are dominated by volcanic deposits, but these are absent in higher layers, indicating that volcanic activity dropped off during this time.

== Paleofauna ==
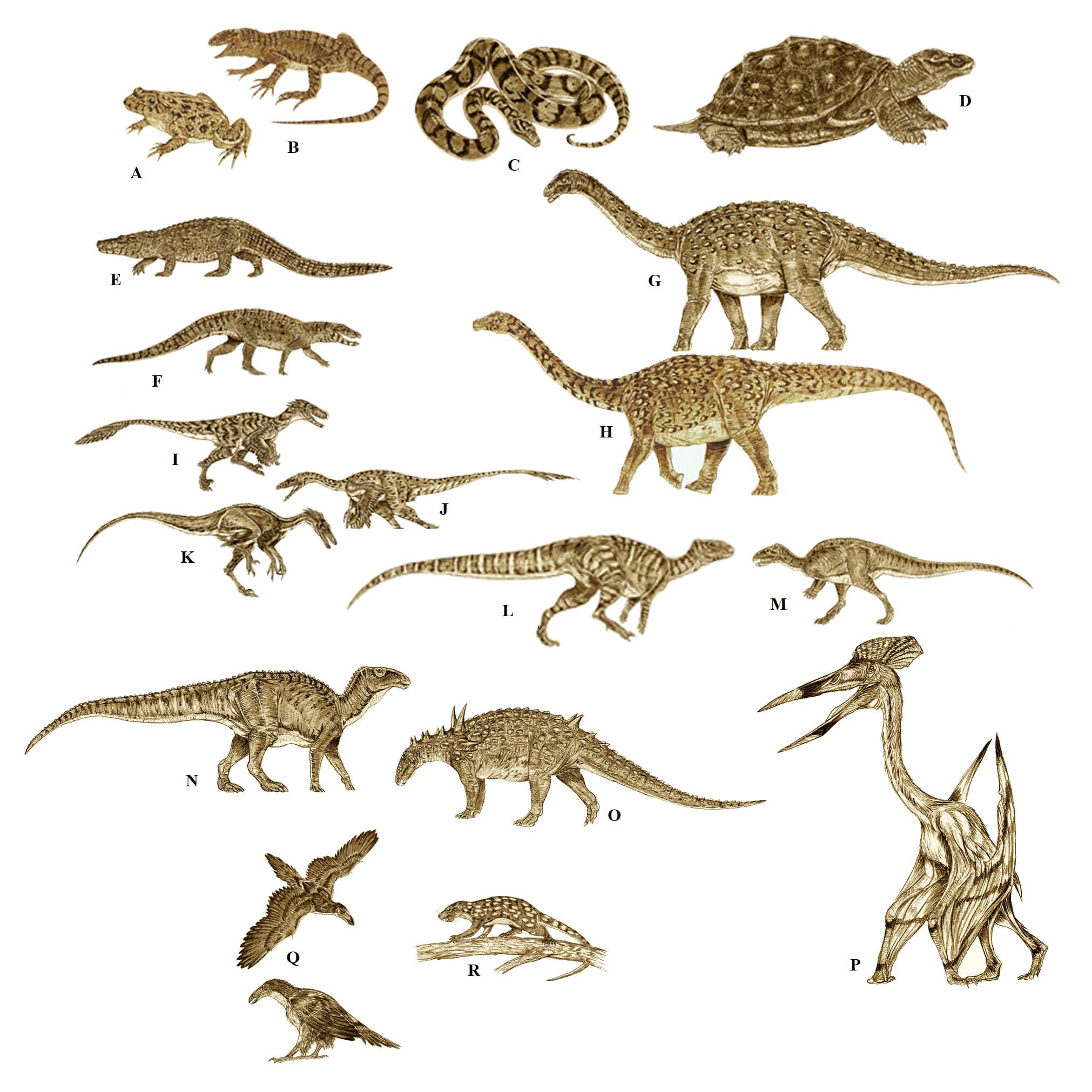
The fauna of Hateg Basin

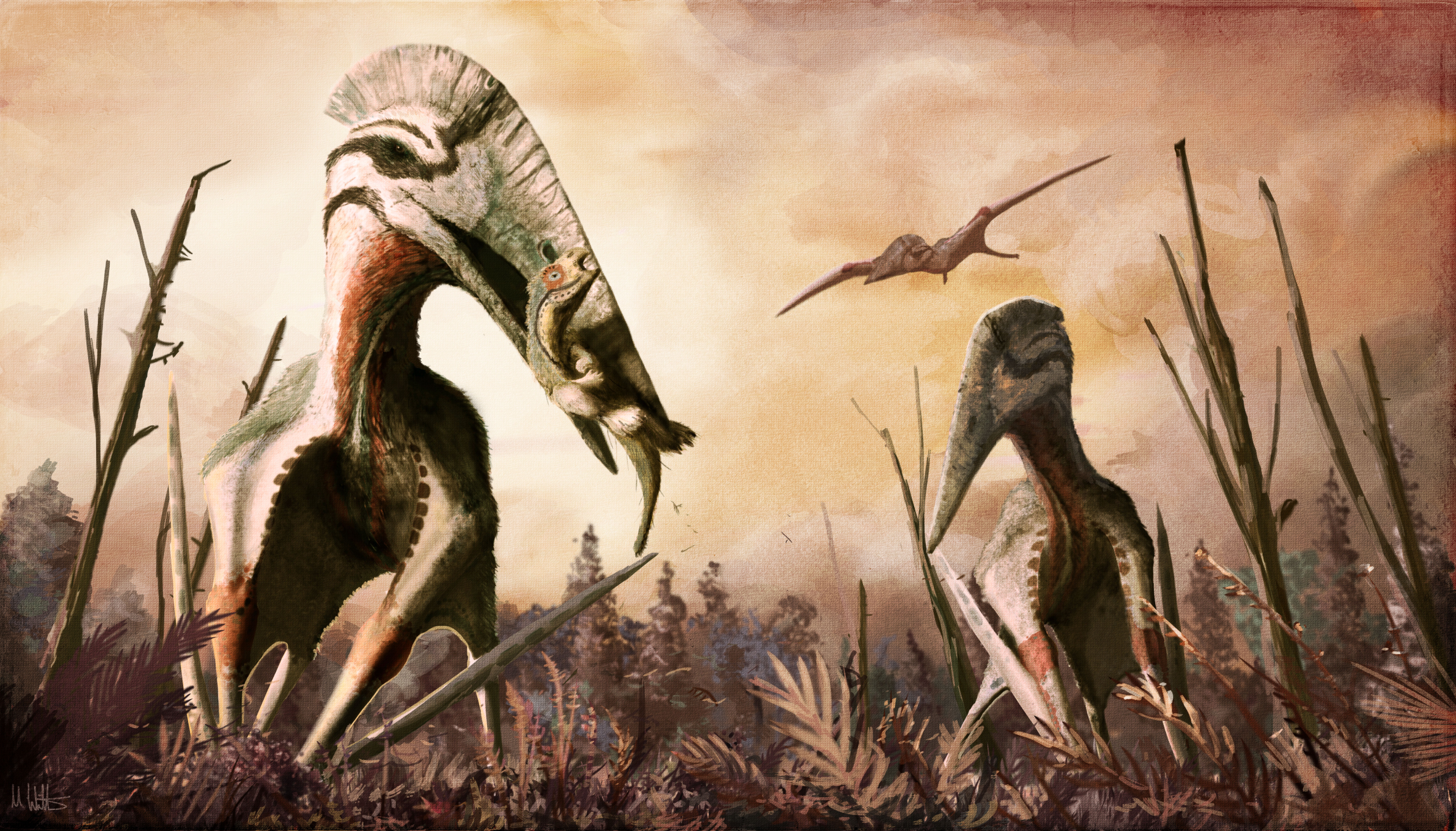
The local macropredator Hatzegopteryx hunting the herbivore Zalmoxes

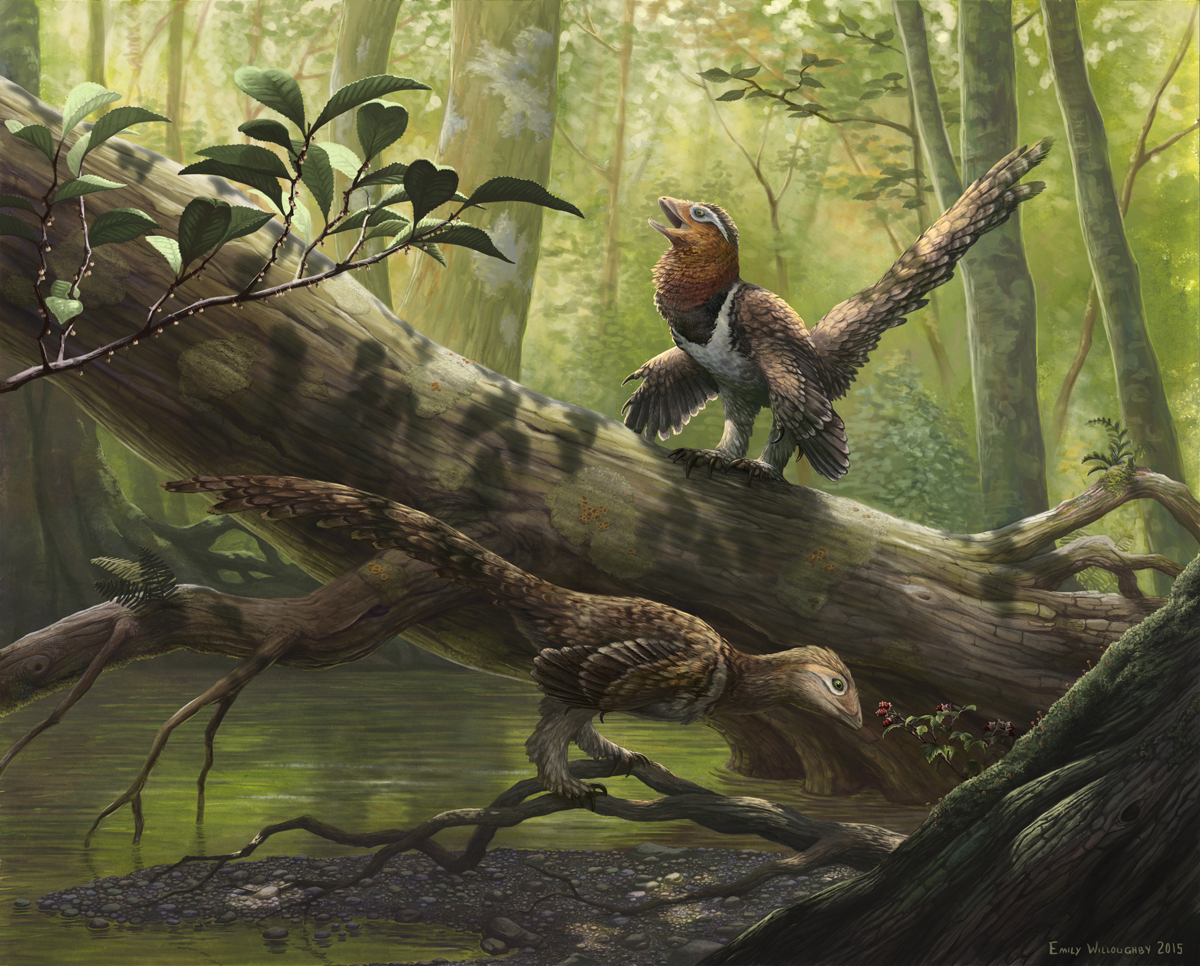
A restoration of Balaur bondoc and the forest vegetation found in Hațeg Island

About nine species of dinosaurs and several species of pterosaur are thought to have been indigenous to the island. The azhdarchid pterosaurs were rather common predators on this island. These insular reptiles differed from their continental relatives due to island syndrome, which describes the differences in morphology, ecology and physiology seen in insular species compared to their continental relatives. Many of them exhibit island dwarfism, becoming much smaller than their mainland relatives. For example the titanosaur, Magyarosaurus dacus, had a body mass of only 900 kilograms (2,000 lb) while mainland titanosaurs like Patagotitan could reach 69 tonnes (76 tons). Conversely Hatzegopteryx exhibited island gigantism, becoming one of the largest pterosaurs ever to have lived. Similar to how extant bird species exhibit reduced wing size and reduced capacity for flight, Balaur bondoc appears to have secondarily lost its capacity for flight. Balaur is currently believed to be a basal avialan based on recent phylogenetic analyses, however, it was originally proposed to be a member of the avialan sister taxon, Deinonychosauria, based on its limb morphology. Its forelimbs were shorter and stockier than those of Avialae and so visibly incapable of powered flight, which led to this originally incorrect placement within the phylogeny. Mammals are almost exclusively represented by the endemic kogaionid multituberculates, an endemic group that evolved in the island's isolation and developed unique insectivorous habits, as well as a single eutherian remain. Among the better-known lizards from the formation is Barbatteius, a genus of relatively large lizards with an estimated total length of 80 cm. Its relatively robust morphology suggests that it may have occupied the role of a medium-sized opportunistic predator within the island ecosystem, potentially comparable in ecological role to modern teiids. Barbatteius may also have served as prey for larger predators inhabiting the island, including Balaur bondoc. Remains of an indeterminate dromaeosaurid have also been found. Among these animals are included:

- Albadraco tharmisensis, an azhdarchid
- Allodaposuchus precedens, an eusuchian
- Aprosuchus ghirai, a late surviving atoposaurid crocodyliform
- Balaur bondoc, originally described as a dromaeosaurid but now believed to be an early example of insular flightless bird, possibly a junior synonym of Elopteryx
- Barbatodon, a genus of multituberculate represented by at least three species
- Barbatteiidae, a family of teioid lizards endemic to the island
- Becklesius nopcsai, a paramacellodid lizard
- Bicuspidon hatzegiensis, a polyglyphanodontian lizard
- Bradycneme draculae, an alvarezsaurid
- Elopteryx nopcsai, an avialan dinosaur
- Eurazhdarcho langendorfensis, an azhdarchid
- Ferenceratops shqiperorum, a ceratopsian previously misidentified as a species of the rhabdodontid Zalmoxes
- Gargantuavis, an avialan dinosaur
- Heptasteornis andrewsi, a dubious alvarezsaurid
- Hatzegobatrachus grigorescui, a possible bombinatorid toad
- Hatzegopteryx thambema, an azhdarchid
- Kallokibotion bajazidi, a perichelydian testudinatan
- Kogaionon ungureanui, a multituberculate
- Kryptohadros kallaiae, a hadrosauromorph
- Litovoi tholocephalos, a dome-headed multituberculate
- Magyarosaurus dacus, a titanosaur
- "Megalosaurus hungaricus", an indeterminate theropod
- Nidophis insularis, an madtsoiid snake
- Paludititan nalatzensis, a titanosaur
- Paralatonia transylvanica, a alytid frog
- Petrustitan hungaricus, a titanosaur
- Rhabdodon priscus, a rhabdodontid
- Sabresuchus sympiestodon, a paralligatorid
- Struthiosaurus transylvanicus, a struthiosaurin nodosaur
- Telmatosaurus transylvanicus, a hadrosauromorph
- Transylvanosaurus platycephalus, a rhabdodontid
- Uriash kadici, a titanosaur
- Zalmoxes robustus, a rhabdodontid
- An unnamed robust-necked azhdarchid pterosaur

== Constituent formations ==
The Hațeg Island record is preserved as a number of formations, dating from the late Campanian to the Maastrichtian. These include:

- Sânpetru Formation
- Densus Ciula Formation
- Sebeș Formation
- Sard Formation
- Jibou Formation

== See also ==
- Hațeg Country Dinosaurs Geopark
- Dinosaurs of Romania
- Franz Nopcsa
- Insular dwarfism
- Burma terrane, another Cretaceous island group with a well-documented insular fauna
