= Dinosaurs of Romania =

The dinosaurs of Romania are mostly Cretaceous in age, though a series of footprints referred to Parabrontopodus mcintoshi was described from the Early Jurassic of Anina, southwestern Romania. Lowermost Cretaceous dinosaurs come from a bauxite mine in the Bihor County (northwest Romania) that has yielded thousands of disarticulated bones. Uppermost Cretaceous dinosaurs have been known from the Hațeg Basin (south Transylvania) since the end of the 19th century, mostly as bone concentrations (fossiliferous pockets); more recently, nests with dinosaur eggs, including hatchlings, have been found in Hațeg. Although separated by a gap of approximately 60 million years, the two dinosaur faunas from Romania share some common features: predominance of ornithopods, absence of large theropods (although the Maastrichtian Hațeg assemblage has several small theropods), and, in general, the small size of the individuals (see also insular dwarfism).

Dinosaurs of Romania

The discovery of dinosaur bones in a bauxite mine at Cornet-Brusturi, near Oradea (Bihor County) was made accidentally by two miners in 1978 during ore exploitation. Almost at the same time, research in the already known Uppermost Cretaceous dinosaur-bearing deposits from the Hațeg Basin were restarted by Dan Grigorescu, after an interruption of more than 60 years, since Franz Nopcsa’s work in the region.

The Berriasian bauxite deposits at Cornet have yielded approximately 10,000 bones and bone fragments, mainly from ornithopod dinosaurs and rarer pterosaurs. The region was located to the east of the Piemont-Liguria Ocean, and during the Early Cretaceous formed an archipelago of coral and volcanic islands, not too dissimilar to today's Indonesia or the Caribbean. As the Apulian Plate moved northwest towards the end of the Cretaceous and the beginning of the uplift of the Alpide belt, the offshore Hațeg Island was formed at the rim of the shrinking Tethys Ocean.

Among the species that lived here are: Zalmoxes, Telmatosaurus, Balaur, Rhabdodon, Magyarosaurus and Struthiosaurus. Other prehistoric creatures that lived among them, without being dinosaurs are: Allodaposuchus and Hatzegopteryx.

== See also ==
- Tara Hategului dinosaur geopark
- Hațeg Island
