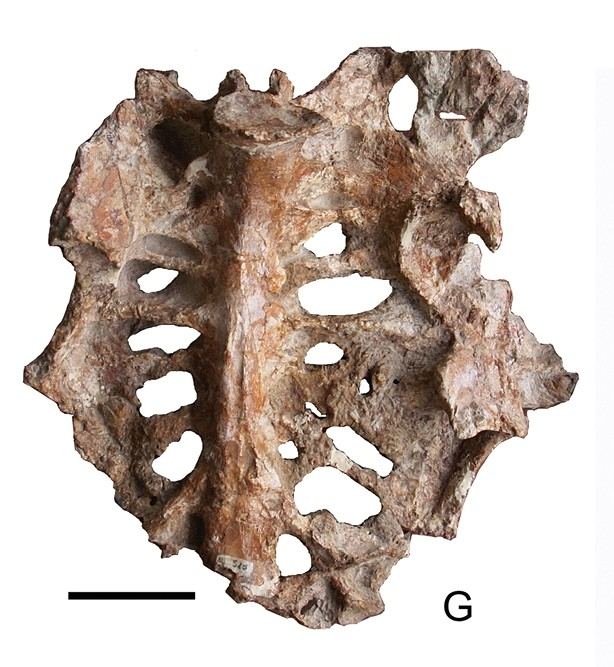
- The holotype of Gargantuavis philoinos, a partial pelvis from Campagne-sur-Aude

Scientific classification
- Kingdom: Animalia
- Phylum: Chordata
- Class: Reptilia
- Clade: Dinosauria
- Clade: Saurischia
- Clade: Theropoda
- Clade: Avialae
- Family: †Gargantuaviidae; Buffetaut and Angst, 2019
- Genus: †Gargantuavis; Buffetaut & Le Loeuff, 1998
- Species: †G. philoinos

Binomial name
- †Gargantuavis philoinos Buffetaut & Le Loeuff, 1998

= Gargantuavis =

Gargantuavis Temporal range: Late Cretaceous (Campanian - Maastrichtian), 73.5–71.5 Ma

Extinct genus of birds

Gargantuavis (meaning 'gargantuan bird') is an extinct genus of large, primitive bird containing the single species Gargantuavis philoinos. It is the only member of the monotypic family Gargantuaviidae. Its fossils were discovered in several formations dating to 73.5 and 71.5 million years ago in what is now northern Spain, Southern France, and Romania. Gargantuavis is the largest known bird of the Mesozoic, a size ranging between the cassowary and the ostrich, and a mass of 141 kg (311 lb) like modern ostriches, exemplifying the extinction of non-avian dinosaurs was not a necessary condition for the emergence of giant terrestrial birds. It was once thought to be closely related to modern birds, but the 2019 discovery of a pelvis identified as cf. Elopteryx nopcsai from what was Hațeg Island (present-day Romania) shows several primitive features.

Its femur shows that it was a graviportal form rather than cursorial, not adapted for running. Due to fragmentary remains, many aspects of its biology and ecology are unknown, such as its diet. It coexisted with large predators like abelisaurid theropods, herbivores such as ankylosaurians and titanosaurian sauropods, as well as pterosaurs, crocodylomorphs, turtles, fish, and various archaic birds.

== Discovery ==
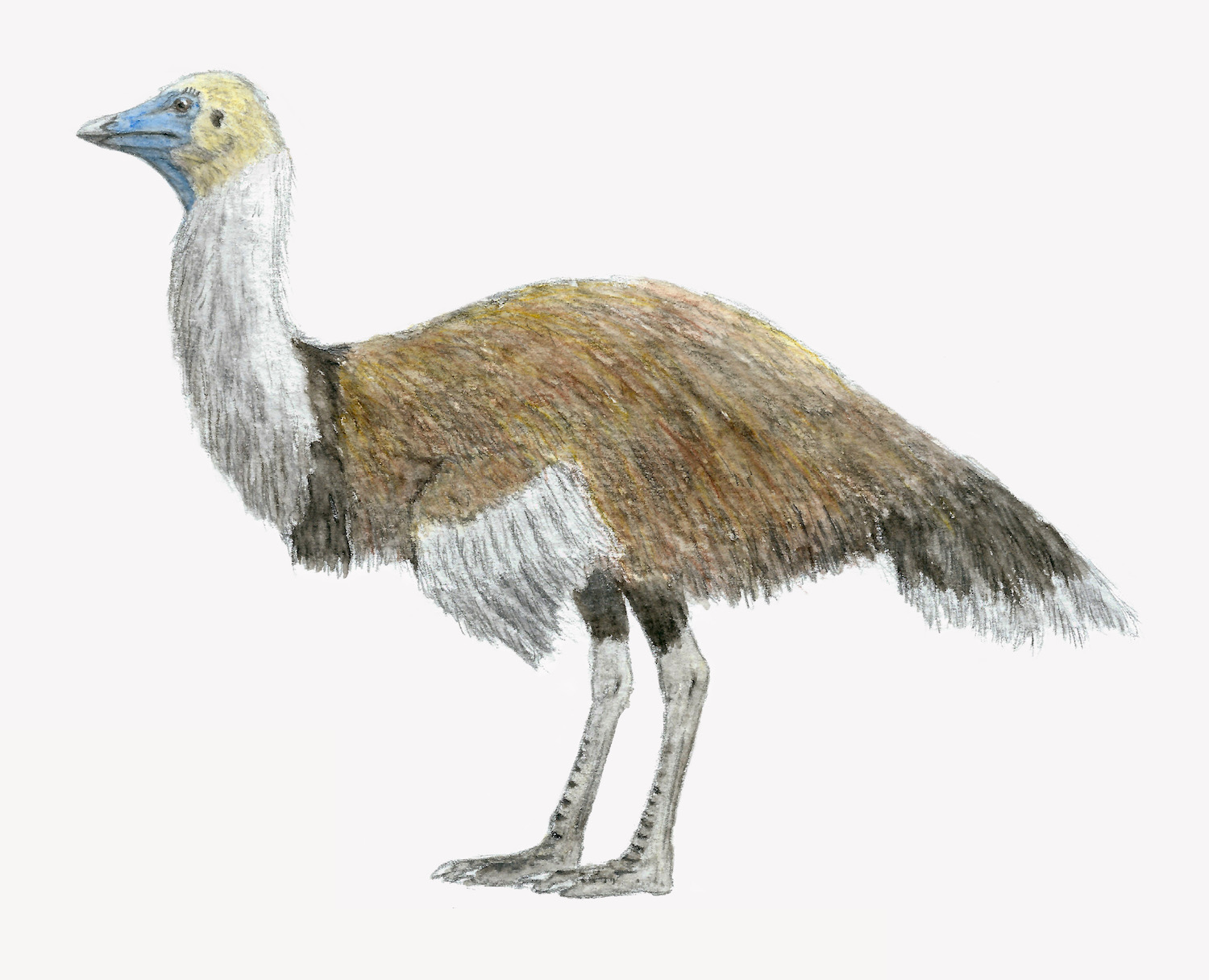
Speculative life restoration of Gargantuavis philoinos

The first Gargantuavis fossil was found in 1995 in Var, southeastern France. This first specimen, a fragmentary set of pelvic vertebrae (synsacrum), was uncovered near the village of Fox-Amphoux in a paleontological excavation and described by French paleontologists Eric Buffetaut and Jean Le Loeuff, who noted the synsacrum's similarity to that of modern birds. Several other specimens were later found further west, near the villages of Villespassans, Cruzy, and Campagne-sur-Aude, providing enough fossil material to describe and name the species in 1998. The genus name refers to Gargantua, the giant and protagonist of the 16th-century French novel The Life of Gargantua and of Pantagruel by Francois Rabelais, and the Latin avis. The species name philoinos, meaning "one who likes wine", was chosen because several of the first Gargantuavis bones were found in and around vineyards and wineries.

Gargantuavis specimens are known from six localities in Europe:

- The Bastide-Neuve locality, near Fox-Amphoux (Var), yielded the initial specimen reported in 1995, two other partial pelvic fragments (BN 758 and BN 763) described in 2015, and a possible rib fragment found in association with BN 763.
- The Bellevue locality, near Campagne-sur-Aude (Aude), yielded another partial pelvis (MDE C3-525), which was deemed the holotype in the 1998 description of the genus. This site has been dated to the early Maastrichtian, about 71.5 million years ago.
- The Combebelle locality, near Villespassans (Hérault), yielded a large femur lacking the distal end (MDE A-08), which was referred to the genus in its initial 1998 description.
- The Montplo-Nord locality, near Cruzy (Hérault), yielded a single neck vertebra (MC-MN 478) which was referred to the genus in 2013. A synsacrum fragment (MC-MN 1165) and an incomplete left ilium (MC-MN 431), both described in 2016, were also found at this locality. More recently, this site has also yielded a complete femur of 23 cm, belonging to an individual of about 50 kg (110 lb).
- A quarry near the village of Laño in northern Spain (Condado de Treviño) yielded a partial syncranum (MCNA 2538) described in 2017, the only specimen known outside of France. This locality has been dated to the late Campanian age of the late Cretaceous, about 72 to 73.5 million years ago.
- The Sânpetru Formation of Romania–what was Hațeg Island–yielded a garguntuaviid pelvis in 2019, identified as cf. Elopteryx nopcsai. Its discovery here revises earlier ideas of the bird being endemic to the Ibero-Armorican Island.

== Description ==
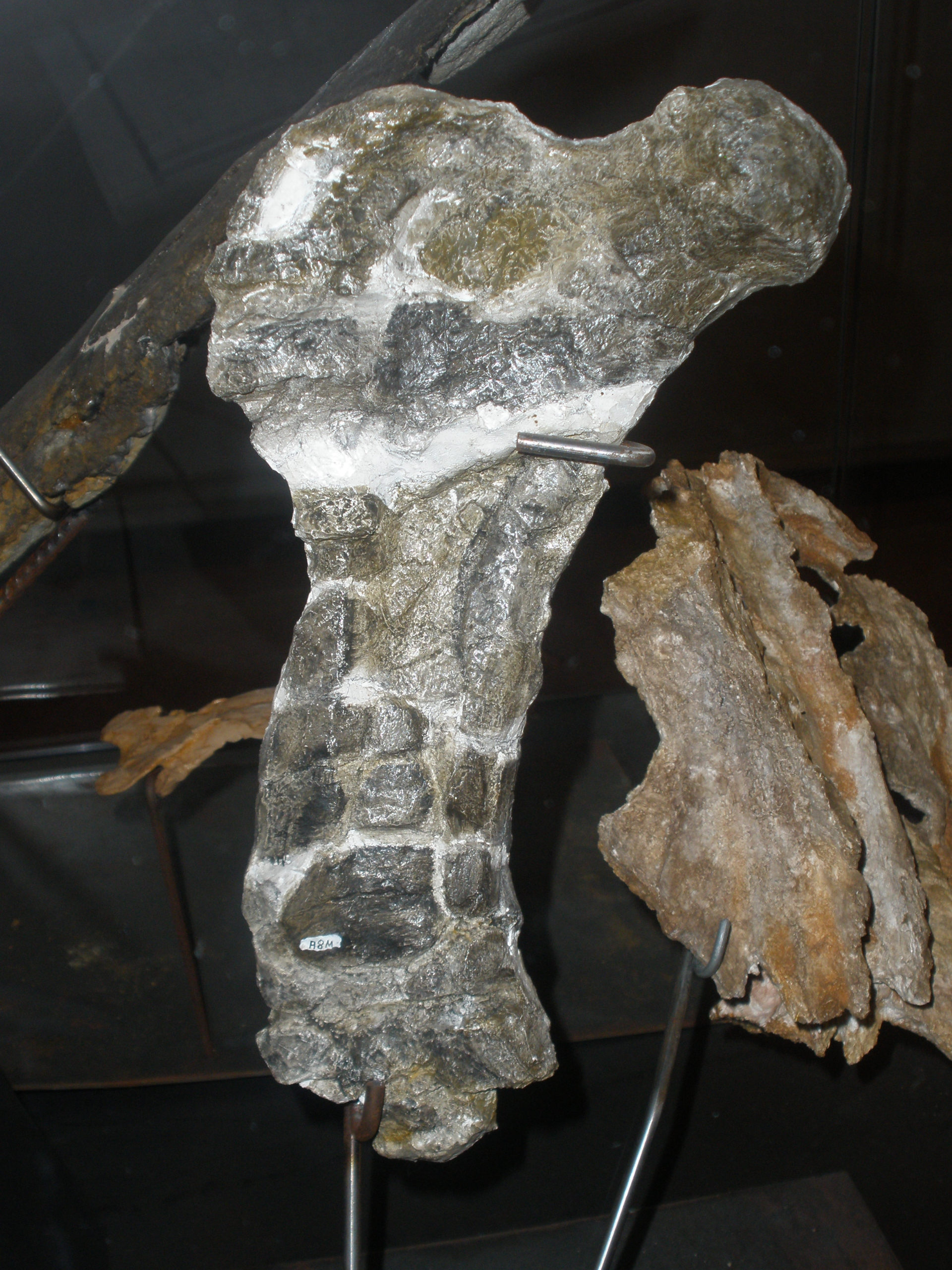
MDE A-08, a femur

Though Gargantuavis is only known from a few isolated fossil bones, some information about its life appearance and ecology have been inferred by studying their details. Gargantuavis is known from several specimens representing a few limited parts of the skeleton: synsacra (the fused vertebrae above the hip), ilia (hip bones), at least one cervical vertebra, and two femora (upper leg bone), which was referred to the species based on the fact that it seems to fit well with the hip. No cranial remains have been found, so the shape of the head is unknown. However, the only known cervical vertebra suggests that Gargantuavis had a rather long and slender neck, which seems to preclude the presence of a massive skull.

Other than its large size, the most unusual feature of Gargantuavis was its pelvis. It was originally reported to be extremely wide, like that of a moa, though a better preserved specimen described in 2015 showed that this interpretation was due to crushing in the original. The hips of Gargantuavis, while still broad, were narrower and more bird-like than originally thought. In addition to their unusual width, which prevented the two ilia from meeting at the front of the pelvis, the hip socket was set close to the front rather than to the middle of the pelvis. The rather broad pelvis shows that Gargantuavis was not a fast runner.

== Paleoecology ==
During the Late Cretaceous, Europe was an archipelago. Southern France and north-western Spain where its fossils are found was part of the large Ibero-Armorican island in the prehistoric Tethys Sea. The rock formations that have yielded Gargantuavis fossils have also produced abundant remains of fish, turtles, crocodylomorphs, pterosaurs, various titanosaurian sauropods (including Ampelosaurus and Lirainosaurus), ankylosaurians, ornithopods, and theropods, including other early avialans, like enantiornithes. The association of abundant fossils of the ornithopod Rhabdodon, and the lack of any hadrosaurid fossils, have been used as index fossils to roughly date these formations to the late Campanian-early Maastrichtian interval, an age confirmed later by magnetostratigraphic evidence in two localities. The type locality of Gargantuavis, the Bellevue site in the Marnes Rouges Inferieures Formation, is 71.5 million years old (earliest Maastrichtian). The Spanish site of Laño is slightly older with an age of 72 to 73.5 Ma (latest Campanian).

Since no skull remains have been found, the diet of the animal is uncertain. Contrary to the giant terrestrial Cenozoic birds that lived in ecosystems without predators (or including only small carnivores), Gargantuavis cohabited with abelisaurid and dromaeosaurid theropods, so the place of this giant terrestrial bird in the Late Cretaceous ecosystems of the Ibero-Armorican island is unclear. Gargantuavis seems to have been an uncommon part of the fauna in its region. Despite numerous digs at sites where its bones have been found since its discovery, most have yielded only single specimens. Although its fossils are rare, the presence of Gargantuavis from southeastern France to north-western Spain shows that this bird had a wide distribution in the Ibero-Armorican island. It is possible that Gargantuavis lived mainly in an environment that was not compatible with fossilization, such as areas far from the rivers and floodplains, which represent most of the fossiliferous deposits in the late Campanian-early Maastrichtian of France and Spain.

Bone histology showed that Gargantuavis had a rapid early growth followed by an extended period (of at least 10 years) of slow cyclical growth before to attain skeletal maturity. A similar pattern is known in extinct dinornithiformes and in the extant kiwi, which are also insular birds. The titanosaur Ampelosaurus, found together with Gargantuavis in the Bellevue site, shows also a reduction in its growth rate, possibly linked to some environmental pressure like periodic food shortages. This is supported by sedimentological and mineralogical studies which indicate episodes of semi-arid and strongly seasonal climate during the Late Cretaceous in Southern France.

== Classification ==
The systematic position of Gargantuavis with other birds is uncertain because of the fragmentary nature of its remains. Some researchers suggested that Gargantuavis was not a stem-bird at all, but rather a giant pterosaur, but this was rejected based on the presence of more bird-like conditions. The shape of its femur suggested that Gargantuavis was not a giant representative of the enantiornithes, a group of archaic birds, rather more advanced because of the higher number of vertebrae in the synsacrum and the more advanced heterocoelous condition (saddle-shaped joint) of the only known cervical vertebra. It was once thought to be closely related to the archaic Patagopteryx, but a study of the complete femur suggested that the species belongs to Ornithuromorpha, and probably Ornithurae, being more closely related to moderns birds than to, belonging to its own monotypic family Gargantuaviidae.

However, the discovery of a pelvis from what was Hațeg Island shows supratrochanteric processes on the femora, a lack of a glycogen body, and a lack of fusion of the pelvic bones around the hip socket, meaning it was not closely related to Ornithurae, and likely not even a member of Ornithothoraces which includes modern birds and their closest ancestors. The archaic Hațeg avian theropods Elopteryx and Balaur bear some similarity to Gargantuavis remains, which may indicate the three form some clade native to the Late Cretaceous European archipelago, though they have ambiguous affinities. This was questioned by other authors, and it is claimed that it was a basal ornithurine, at an evolutionary level similar to that of Hesperornithies, but the authors of the original study stood by their 'cautious' conclusion.
