= Sebeș Formation =

- Stratigraphic range: Maastrichtian, 70–66 Ma
- Type: Geological formation
- Underlies: Unconformity
- Overlies: Bozeș Formation, Flysch

Lithology
- Primary: Claystone
- Other: Sandstone, Conglomerate

Location
- Region: Europe
- Country: Romania
- Extent: Transylvanian Basin

Type section
- Named for: Sebeș

The Sebeș Formation is a geological formation in Romania dating to the Maastrichtian age of the Cretaceous, and laterally equivalent to the nearby Șard Formation. The base of the formation consists of claystones interbedded with sandstones and conglomerates. These lithologies have preserved fossils which are part of the Hațeg Island fauna.

== Paleobiota ==
=== Turtles ===
Turtles of the Sebeș Formation
| Genus | Species | Notes | Images |
|---|---|---|---|
| Kallokibotion | K. bajazidi | | |
| Dortokidae | Indeterminate | | |

=== Dinosaurs ===
Indeterminate hadrosauroid fossils have been unearthed here.

Dinosaurs of the Sebeș Formation
| Genus | Species | Materials | Notes | Images |
|---|---|---|---|---|
| Balaur | B. bondoc | Partial avialan skeleton, probably a junior synonym of Elopteryx | A paravian | |
| Magyarosaurus | Indeterminate | The only known vertebra was probably eroded from the nearby Șard Formation and placed at Sebeș instead. | A dwarf sauopod. | |
| Struthiosaurus | S. transsylvanicus | | A nodosaur. | |
| Telmatosaurus | Indeterminate | | A small hadrosauromorph. | |
| Zalmoxes | Z. robustus | | Probable rhabdodontid ornithopod dinosaur. | |
| Enantiornithes | Indeterminate | | | |

=== Pterosaurs ===
Pterosaurs of the Sebeș Formation
| Genus | Species | Notes | Images |
|---|---|---|---|
| Eurazhdarcho | E. langendorfensis | An azhdarchid pterosaur. | |
| Hatzegopteryx | Indeterminate | A giant azhdarchid pterosaur. | |

== See also ==
- List of fossiliferous stratigraphic units in Romania
- List of dinosaur-bearing rock formations
