= Sânpetru Formation =

Geological formation in Romania

- Stratigraphic range: Early Maastrichtian; ~70–68 Ma
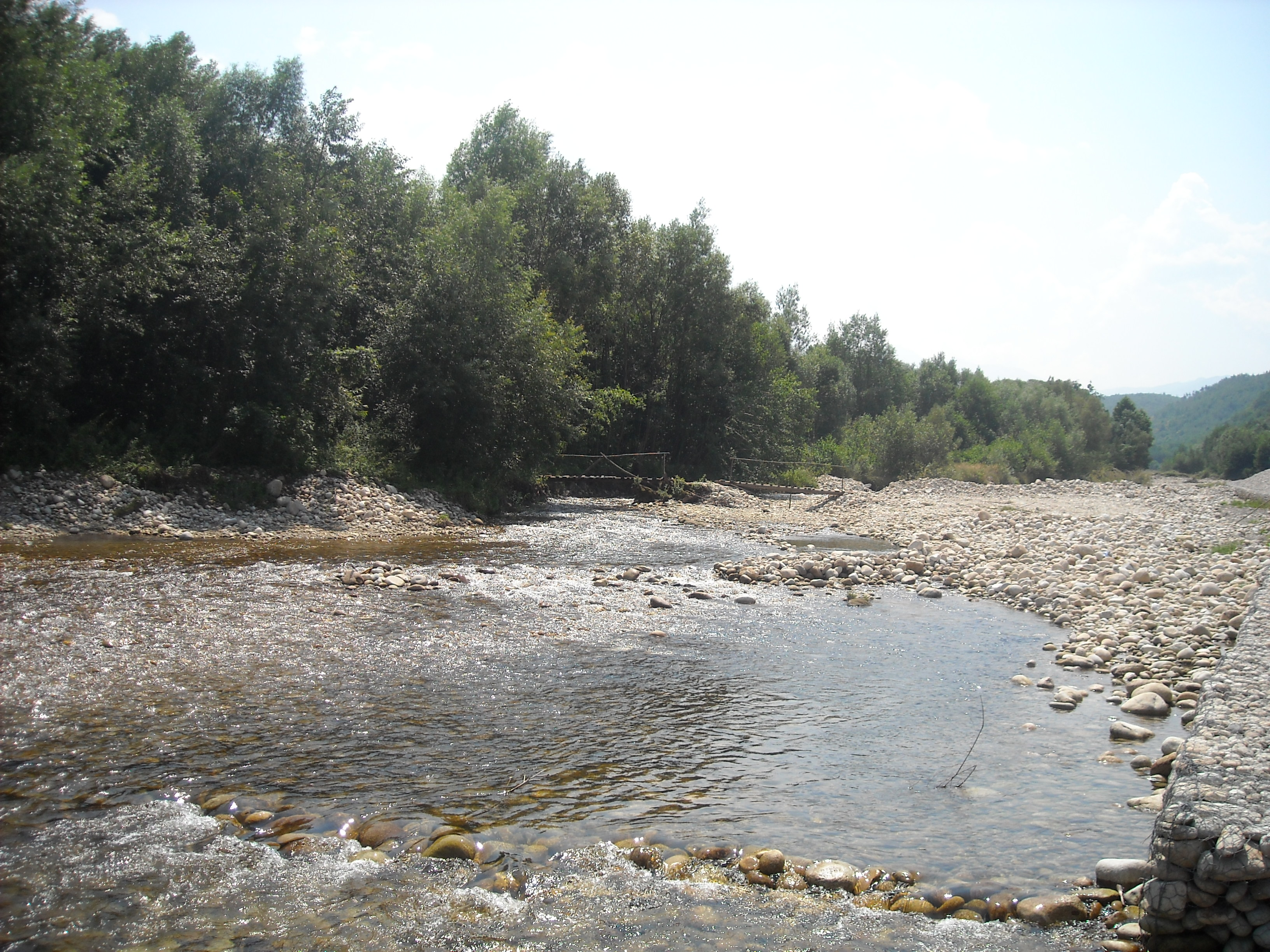
- Sibișel River near the Sânpetru Formation
- Type: Geological formation
- Sub-units: Lower & Upper Members
- Underlies: Miocene deposits
- Overlies: Strei Formation, flysch
- Thickness: 2,500 m (8,200 ft) of which 860 m (2,820 ft) exposed

Lithology
- Primary: Mudstone, sandstone
- Other: Conglomerate

Location
- Coordinates: 45.6°N 22.9°E
- Approximate paleocoordinates: 30.5°N 22.1°E
- Region: Hunedoara
- Country: Romania
- Extent: Central Hațeg Basin

Type section
- Named for: Sânpetru
- Sânpetru Formation (Romania)

The Sânpetru Formation is an early Maastrichtian geologic formation located in Romania, near Sânpetru village, part of Sântămăria-Orlea commune. Dinosaur remains are among the fossils that have been recovered from the formation, comprising some of the fauna of Hațeg Island.

== Description ==
The Sânpetru Formation crops out in the central to southern Hațeg Basin along the Bărbat River and comprises sandstones and mudstones deposited in a wet floodplain environment characterized by braided fluvial channels. The formation is correlated with the Densuș-Ciula Formation of the northern section of the same basin, both dating to the Maastrichtian of the Late Cretaceous.

== Fossil content ==
Color key: Taxon / Reclassified taxon / Taxon falsely reported as present / Dubious taxon or junior synonym / Ichnotaxon / Ootaxon / Morphotaxon	Notes; Uncertain or tentative taxa are in small text; ~~crossed out~~ taxa are discredited.

=== Amphibians ===
Amphibians of the Sânpetru Formation
Genus	Species	Location	Stratigraphic position	Abundance	Notes	Images
Albanerpeton	Indeterminate				Albanerpetontid	
Paralatonia	P. transylvanica				Frog	

=== Turtles ===
Turtles of the Sânpetru Formation
Genus	Species	Location	Stratigraphic position	Abundance	Notes	Images
Kallokibotion	K. bajazidi					
Dortokidae	Indeterminate					
Emydidae	Indeterminate					

=== Squamates ===
Squamates of the Sânpetru Formation
Genus	Species	Location	Stratigraphic position	Abundance	Notes	Images
Barbatteius	B. vremiri					
Becklesius	B. nopcsai					
Bicuspidon	B. hatzegiensis					
Lacertilia	Indeterminate				5 distinct taxa	
Madtsoiidae	Indeterminate				Snake	

=== Crocodyliformes ===
Crocodyliformes of the Sânpetru Formation
Genus	Species	Location	Stratigraphic position	Abundance	Notes	Images
Allodaposuchus	Indeterminate					
Sabresuchus	S. sympiestodon					

=== Ornithischians ===
Ornithischians of the Sânpetru Formation
Genus	Species	Location	Stratigraphic position	Abundance	Notes	Images
Struthiosaurus	S. transylvanicus	Sânpetru		A skull and partial skeleton.	A nodosaur.	
Telmatosaurus	T. transsylvanicus			"[Five to ten] fragmentary skulls, some with associated postcrania, mixed age classes."	A small hadrosauromorph.	
Zalmoxes	Z. robustus			Many remains	Originally identified as a rhabdodontid ornithopod, but possibly a ceratopsian closely related to Ajkaceratops and Ferenceratops	
Ferenceratops	F. shqiperorum	Sibișel Valley	Upper	A left dentary, sacrum, right scapula, right coracoid, partial left ilium, partial right ilium, right ischium, left distal ischium and left femur.	Originally "Zalmoxes" shqiperorum but subsequently recognized as a distinct ceratopsian taxon closely related to Ajkaceratops	

=== Sauropods ===
Sauropods of the Sânpetru Formation
Genus	Species	Location	Stratigraphic position	Abundance	Notes	Images
Magyarosaurus	M. dacus				A dwarf sauropod.	
Paludititan	P. nalatzensis			A partial skeleton lacking the skull.	A dwarf sauropod	Dorsal vertebra of Paludititan
Petrustitan	P. hungaricus	Sibișel River Valley.	Upper	Partial skeleton composed of caudal vertebrae, right ulna, right radius, right metacarpal, right ilium, and left fibula.	A dwarf sauropod, originally assigned to the genus Magyarosaurus	

=== Theropods ===
Theropods of the Sânpetru Formation
Genus	Species	Location	Stratigraphic position	Material	Notes	Images
Gargantuavis	Indeterminate			Pelvis		Gargantuavis
Bradycneme	B. draculae			"Distal tibiotarsus."		Bradycneme
Elopteryx	E. nopcsai			"Fragmentary femur."		
Euronychodon	Indeterminate					
Heptasteornis	H. andrewsi			"Distal tibiotarsus."		
Megalosaurus	M. hungaricus			"Tooth."		

=== Pterosaurs ===
Pterosaurs reported from the Sânpetru Formation
Genus	Species	Location	Stratigraphic position	Material	Notes	Images
Eurazhdarcho	E.langendorfensis				An azhdarchid pterosaur.	
Hatzegopteryx	H.thambema				A giant azhdarchid pterosaur.	

=== Mammals ===
Mammals from the Sânpetru Formation
Genus	Species	Location	Stratigraphic position	Material	Notes	Images
Barbatodon	B. transylvanicus				Kogaionid	
Kogaionon	K. ungureanui				Kogaionid	

== See also ==
- List of fossiliferous stratigraphic units in Romania
- List of dinosaur-bearing rock formations
- Hațeg Island
