= Paralatonia =

Scientific classification
- Kingdom: Animalia
- Phylum: Chordata
- Class: Amphibia
- Order: Anura
- Family: Alytidae
- Genus: †Paralatonia; Venczel & Csiki, 2003

Extinct genus of frogs

Paralatonia is an extinct genus of alytid frog from the late Cretaceous of Sânpetru and Densuş-Ciula Formation, Hațeg Island, in modern day Romania.

== See also ==
- Prehistoric amphibian
- List of prehistoric amphibians
