= Densuș-Ciula Formation =

Late Cretaceous geological formation in Romania

- Stratigraphic range: Maastrichtian
- Type: Geological formation
- Sub-units: Lower, Middle and Upper Members
- Underlies: Cenozoic deposits
- Overlies: Flysch

Lithology
- Primary: Mudstone, sandstone, conglomerate

Location
- Country: Romania
- Extent: Northwest Hațeg Basin

The Densuș-Ciula Formation is a geological formation in Romania, with strata dating to the Late Cretaceous. It forms part of the Hațeg Island assemblage, with dinosaur remains among the fossils recovered from the formation.

The formation is divided into three members. The lower member contains a high proportion of volcanogenic material and is poorly fossiliferous. The middle member consists of silty mudstones, sandstones, and conglomerates containing volcanogenic clasts, and is richly fossiliferous. The upper member is composed of matrix-supported red conglomerates and contains few fossils.

== Fossil content ==
Indeterminate dromaeosaurid and possible indeterminate troodontid remains present in Județul Hunedoara, Romania. An unnamed theropod is also present.

=== Amphibians ===
Amphibians
Genus	Species	Presence	Notes	Images
Albanerpeton	Indeterminate		Albanerpetontid	
Paralatonia	P. transylvanica		Alytid	
Hatzegobatrachus	H. grigorescui		Bombinatorid	

=== Squamates ===
Squamates
Genus	Species	Presence	Notes	Images
Nidophis	N. insularis		Madtsoiid snake	

=== Turtles ===
Turtles
Genus	Species	Presence	Notes	Images
Kallokibotion	K. bajazidi			
Dortokidae	Indeterminate			

=== Crocodyliformes ===
Crocodyliformes
Genus	Species	Presence	Material	Notes	Images
Allodaposuchus	A. precedens		A skull	A crocodyliform.	Allodaposuchus precedens skull Life restoration of Doratodon
Doratodon	Indeterminate				Allodaposuchus precedens skull Life restoration of Doratodon
Sabresuchus	S. sympiestodon			A neosuchian, formerly thought to be Theriosuchus	Allodaposuchus precedens skull Life restoration of Doratodon

=== Dinosaurs ===
Dinosaurs of the Densuș-Ciula Formation
Genus	Species	Presence	Material	Notes	Images
Balaur	B. bondoc			A paravian, possibly a junior synonym of Elopteryx	
Ferenceratops	F. shqiperorum	Hunedoara County	A partial skeleton of a juvenile individual and a left dentary	Originally "Zalmoxes" shqiperorum but subsequently recognized as a distinct ceratopsian taxon closely related to Ajkaceratops. Only the pelvic material has been referred to Ferenceratops as of the taxon's description in 2026.	
Kryptohadros	K. kallaiae	Hunedoara County	A partial skull and skeleton	A hadrosauroid	
Telmatosaurus	T. transsylvanicus		A skull.	A hadrosauromorph.	
Uriash	U. kadici	Locality VI of Kadić.	A partial skeleton composed of incomplete vertebrae, metatarsal, femur, and humerus.	A titanosaur.	
Zalmoxes	Z. robustus	Hunedoara County		A small rhabdodontid ornithopod	

=== Pterosaurs ===
Pterosaurs of Densuș-Ciula Formation.
Genus	Species	Presence	Material	Notes	Images
Hatzegopteryx	H. thambema	Valioara	A preserved robust skull, incomplete left humerus, and unidentified bone fragments.	A giant azhdarchid pterosaur.	

=== Mammals ===
Mammals
Genus	Species	Presence	Notes	Images
Hainina	Indeterminate		Two species	

=== Plants ===
Plants
Genus	Species	Presence	Notes	Images
Sabalites	S. sp		A palm	

== See also ==
- List of fossiliferous stratigraphic units in Romania
- List of dinosaur-bearing rock formations
