= List of fossiliferous stratigraphic units in Romania =

Group or Formation	Period	Notes
Bedoulian Formation	Cretaceous	
Boteni Formation	Neogene	
Bozes Formation	Cretaceous	
Brașov Formation	Cretaceous	
Căpușu Formation	Paleogene	
Casimcea Formation	Jurassic	
Cataloi Formation	Triassic	
Cernavodă Formation	Cretaceous	
Cochirleni Formation	Cretaceous	
Curchia Formation	Neogene	
Dealul Zânei Formation	Jurassic	
Dej Tuff Formation	Neogene	
Densuș-Ciula Formation	Cretaceous	
Frățești Formation	Pleistocene	
Gârbova de Sus Formation	Neogene	
Globu Craiovei Formation	Neogene	
Gosau Formation	Cretaceous	
Iancila Formation	Cretaceous	
Ileanda Formation	Paleogene	
Inucu Formation	Paleogene	
Jibou Formation	Paleogene, Cretaceous	
Jugur Formation	Neogene	
Lapoș Formation	Cretaceous	
Lower Bauxite Formation	Cretaceous	
Marelb Formation	Triassic	
Mera Formation	Paleogene	
Rakoczy Formation	Paleogene	
Repedea Hill Fossil Site	Neogene	
Sânpetru Formation	Cretaceous	
Șard Formation	Cretaceous	
Sebeș Formation	Cretaceous	
Sfânta Ana Olistolith Formation	Jurassic	
Steierdorf Formation	Jurassic	
Steieresdorf Formation	Jurassic	
Strunga Formation	Jurassic	
Strungulița Formation	Jurassic	
Tichilești Formation	Jurassic	
Uzum Bair Formation	Triassic	
Valea Măgurii Formation	Cretaceous	
Vârciorog Formation	Cretaceous	

== See also ==
- Lists of fossiliferous stratigraphic units in Europe
