= Hațeg Country Dinosaurs Geopark =

- Geoparcul Dinozaurilor „Țara Hațegului”
- IUCN category V (protected landscape/seascape)
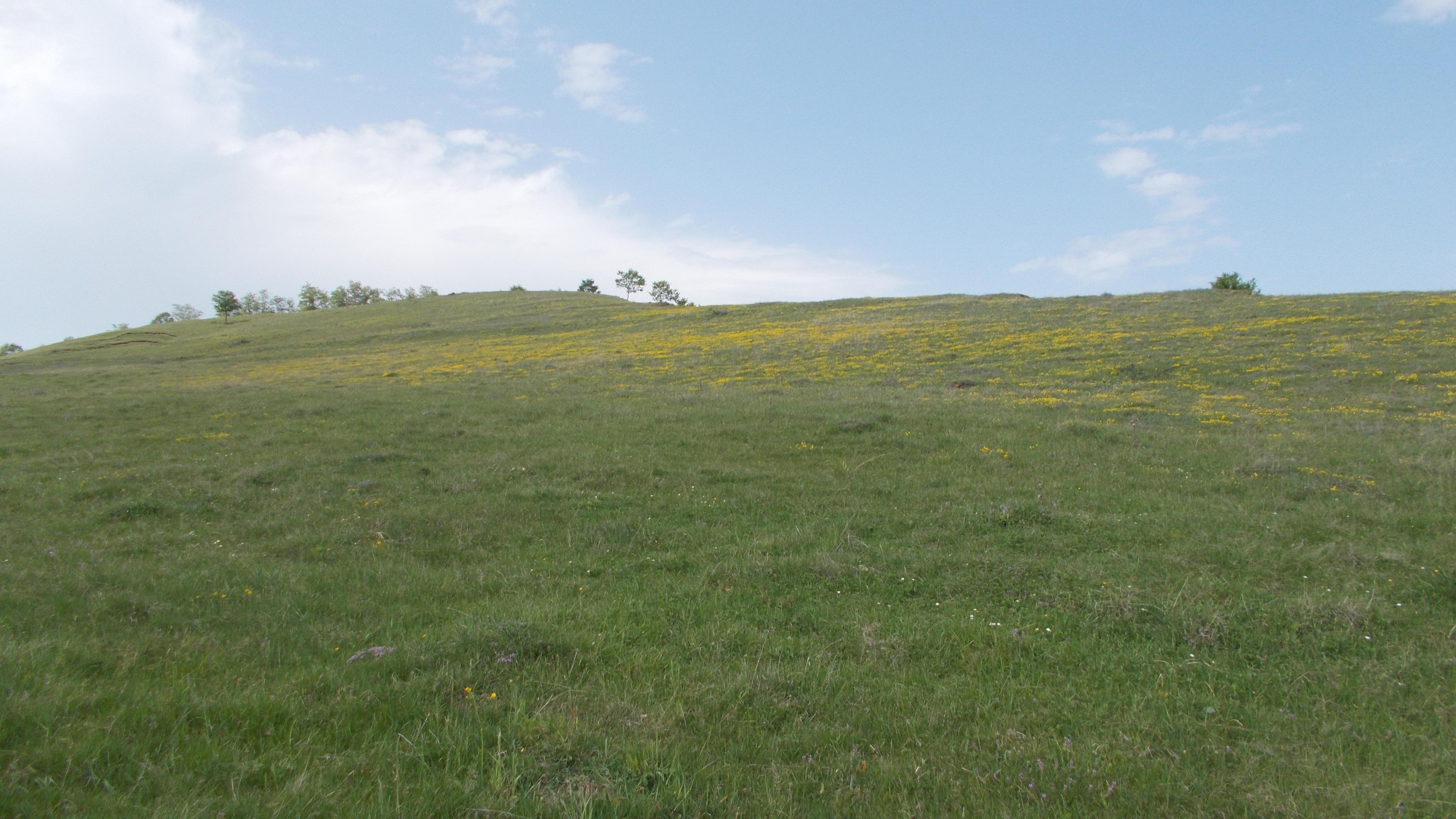

- Location within Romania
- Location: Romania
- Nearest city: Hațeg
- Coordinates: 45.612°N 22.884°E
- Area: 102.392 hectares (253.02 acres)
- Established: 2005
- Website: hateggeoparc.ro

The Hațeg Country Dinosaurs Geopark has been established in 2004–05 in the general area of the prehistoric Hațeg Island, a large offshore island in the Tethys Sea which existed during the late Cretaceous period, probably from the Cenomanian to the Maastrichtian ages.

== Description ==
The park is part of the European Geoparks Network and it aims to promote the local values, to ensure the restoration of the monuments, to identify and document the local traditions and to educate and inform the local communities on how to preserve the local cultural identity. The park was added to the Global Geopark Network when this was set up in 2005, and then became a UNESCO Global Geopark in 2015.

The Hațeg Country is a territory that hosts probably the richest cultural patrimony of Romania. Here are found some of the oldest churches from north of Danube, the largest concentration of medieval sites and monuments in Romania and a big number of architectural monuments, all included in the National Patrimony.

The communities from the region are keepers of important local traditions enriched with elements of the foreign cultures that have interacted with the region throughout its history.

== See also ==
- Hațeg Island
- European Geoparks Network
