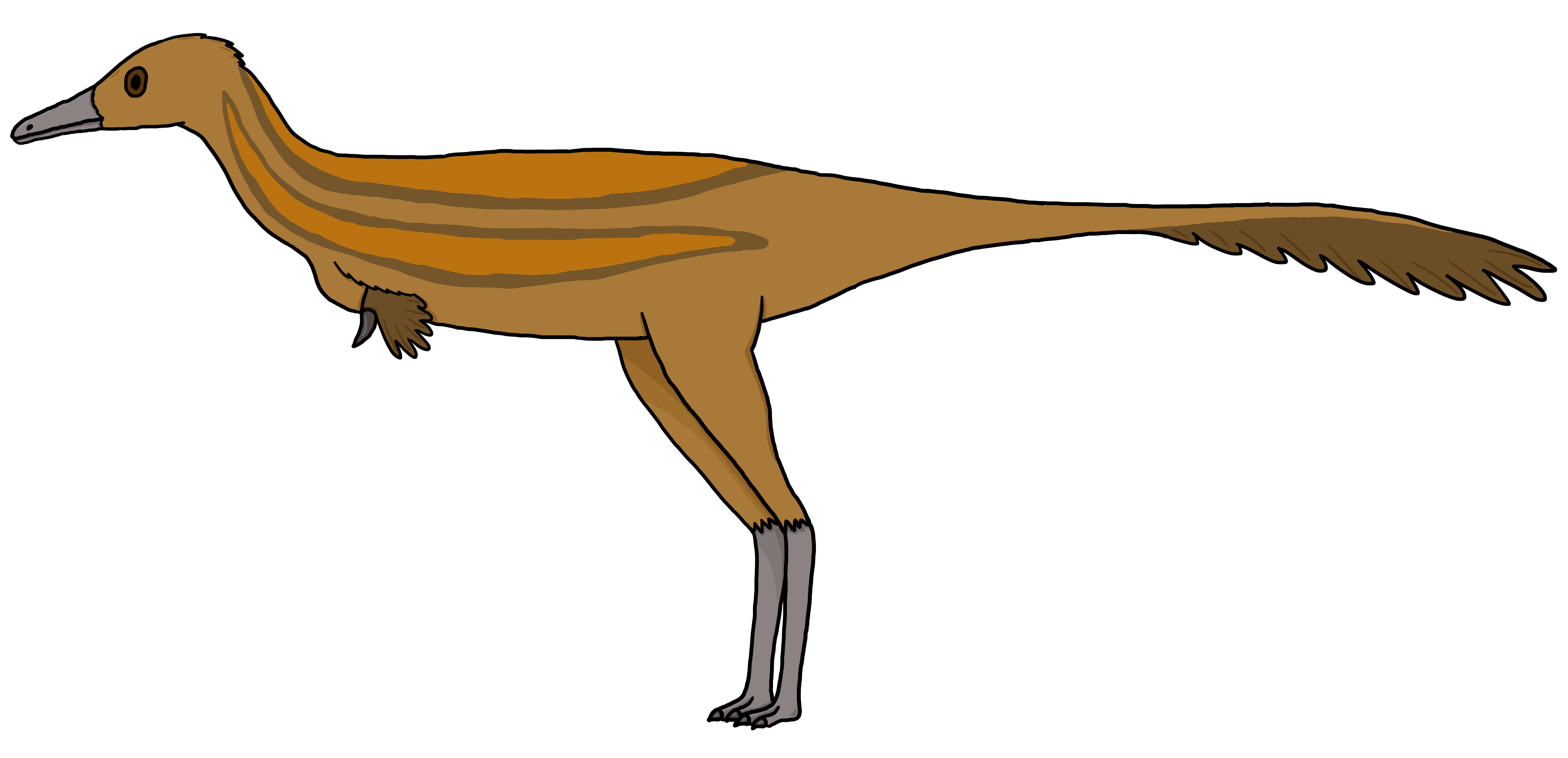
- Bradycneme speculatively restored as an alvarezsaurid

Scientific classification
- Kingdom: Animalia
- Phylum: Chordata
- Class: Reptilia
- Clade: Dinosauria
- Clade: Saurischia
- Clade: Theropoda
- Genus: †Bradycneme; Harrison & Walker, 1975
- Species: †B. draculae

Binomial name
- †Bradycneme draculae Harrison & Walker, 1975

= Bradycneme =

Bradycneme Temporal range: Maastrichtian, 70–66 Ma

Extinct genus of dinosaurs

Bradycneme (meaning "ponderous leg") is a genus of maniraptoran theropod dinosaur from the Upper Cretaceous-aged (Maastrichtian) Sânpetru Formation of the Hațeg Basin, Transylvania, Romania. The type species is Bradycneme draculae, known only from a partial right lower leg (specimen BMNH A1588), which its original describers believed it came from a giant owl.

== History ==
In 1975, Harrison and Walker described two "bradycnemids" from Romania: B. draculae and Heptasteornis andrewsi. These specimens had initially been assigned to the supposed pelecaniform bird Elopteryx nopcsai. The generic name, Bradycneme, comes from the Ancient Greek bradys (βραδύς), meaning "slow, ponderous" and kneme (κνήμη), meaning "leg", as the holotype, BMNH A1588, a 37.8 millimetres (1.49 in) wide distal tibiotarsus found by Maud Eleanora Seeley, would be very stout if the animal had been an owl, with a body height of about 2 metres (6.6 ft). The specific name, draculae, is derived from Romanian dracul, meaning "the dragon," and refers to Dracula.

Starting with Pierce Brodkorb, the specimens were soon compared to small theropod dinosaurs. Bradycneme, Elopteryx and Heptasteornis have been synonymized, split, and reassessed numerous times since then in part because of the fragmentary nature of the remains; there exist three proximal femora and three distal tibiotarsi, which may belong to one, two, or three species. Usually, at least one of them is considered to be a troodontid.

In the most recent assessments, Bradycneme and Heptasteornis were found to be the same and most likely basal members of the Tetanurae in one study, but Darren Naish and Gareth J. Dyke did not follow the synonymy and found Heptasteornis to be an alvarezsaurid, while classifying Bradycneme as an indeterminate maniraptoran. In a 2011 classification, Tom Holtz assigned Bradycneme to the Alvarezsauridae along with Heptasteornis. In 2024, Stoicescu and colleagues suggested that Bradycneme probably represents a junior synonym of the paravian theropod Elopteryx.
