= Campagne-sur-Aude =

Commune in Occitanie, France

- Commune
- Coat of arms
- Location of Campagne-sur-Aude
- Location within France Location within Occitanie
- Coordinates: 42°55′03″N 2°12′27″E
- Country: France
- Region: Occitania
- Department: Aude
- Arrondissement: Limoux
- Canton: La Haute-Vallée de l'Aude

Government
  - Mayor (2020–2026): Gilbert Simon
- Area^{1}: 5.97 km^{2} (2.31 sq mi)
- Elevation: 251 m (823 ft)
- Highest elevation: 560 m (1,840 ft)
- Lowest elevation: 239 m (784 ft)
- Population (2023): 618
  - Density: 104/km^{2} (268/sq mi)
- Time zone: UTC+01:00 (CET)
  - Summer (DST): UTC+02:00 (CEST)
- INSEE/Postal code: 11063 /11260
- ^{1} French Land Register data, which excludes lakes, ponds, glaciers > 1 km^{2} (0.386 sq mi or 247 acres) and river estuaries.

Campagne-sur-Aude (French pronunciation: [kɑ̃paɲ syʁ od]; Occitan: Campanha d'Aude) is a commune in the Aude department in southern France.

== Population ==
Historical population
Year	Pop.	±% p.a.
1968	520	—
1975	575	+1.45%
1982	617	+1.01%
1990	641	+0.48%
1999	593	−0.86%
2007	642	+1.00%
2012	642	+0.00%
2017	581	−1.98%
2023	618	+1.03%
Source: INSEE

== See also ==
- Communes of the Aude department
