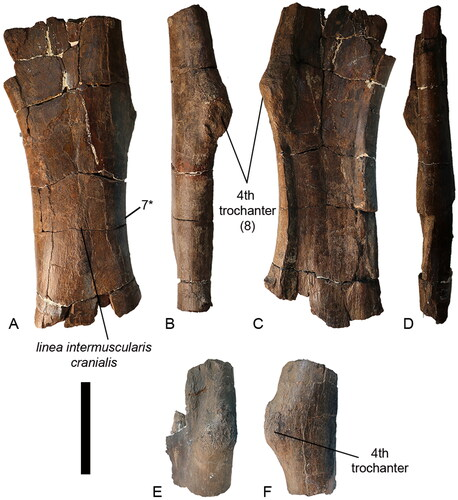
- Femoral fragments from the holotype of U. kadici; right femur (A-D) and left femur (E-F)

Scientific classification
- Kingdom: Animalia
- Phylum: Chordata
- Class: Reptilia
- Clade: Dinosauria
- Clade: Saurischia
- Clade: †Sauropodomorpha
- Clade: †Sauropoda
- Clade: †Macronaria
- Clade: †Titanosauria
- Clade: †Lithostrotia
- Genus: †Uriash; Díez Díaz et al., 2025
- Species: †U. kadici

Binomial name
- †Uriash kadici Díez Díaz et al., 2025

= Uriash =

Uriash Temporal range: Maastrichtian, 71–66 Ma

Extinct genus of dinosaurs

Uriash is a genus of titanosaurian sauropod dinosaur from the Late Cretaceous (Maastrichtian) of Romania. The holotype of this genus was originally referred to Magyarosaurus hungaricus, which is now classified in a separate genus, Petrustitan.

== Discovery and naming ==
In 1914, the Hungarian geologist Ottokár Kadić in the Pârâul Budurone ravine near Vălioara, discovered a skeleton of a sauropod which was markedly larger than previously found sauropod remains in the area. In 1916, the discovery, consisting of limb bones and eight vertebrae, was reported in the scientific literature. By 12 January 1927 two vertebrae had been sent to Friedrich von Huene at the University of Tübingen. Von Huene described these in 1932, preliminary referring them to a ?Magyarosaurus hungaricus, presently Petrustitan.

In 2021 the site was rediscovered and only then it was realised that all the bones had belonged to a single animal, "Individual C". It was concluded that it represented a taxon new to science.

In 2025, the type species Uriash kadici was named and described by Verónica Díez Díaz, Philip David Mannion, Zoltán Csiki-Sava and Paul Upchurch. The generic name Uriash references the Romanian word uriaș, the giant in Romanian Folklore, while the specific name kadici references the Hungarian geologist Ottokár Kadić (1876–1957).

Individual C is the holotype. It was found in the lower middle member of the Densuş-Ciula Formation probably dating from the early Maastrichtian. It contains the tail vertebrae SZTFH Ob.3090 B, D, G, H (four vertebrae have been lost), the right humerus SZTFH Ob.3104, the thighbones SZTFH Ob.3103 and the left first metatarsal SZTFH Ob.3095.

== Description ==
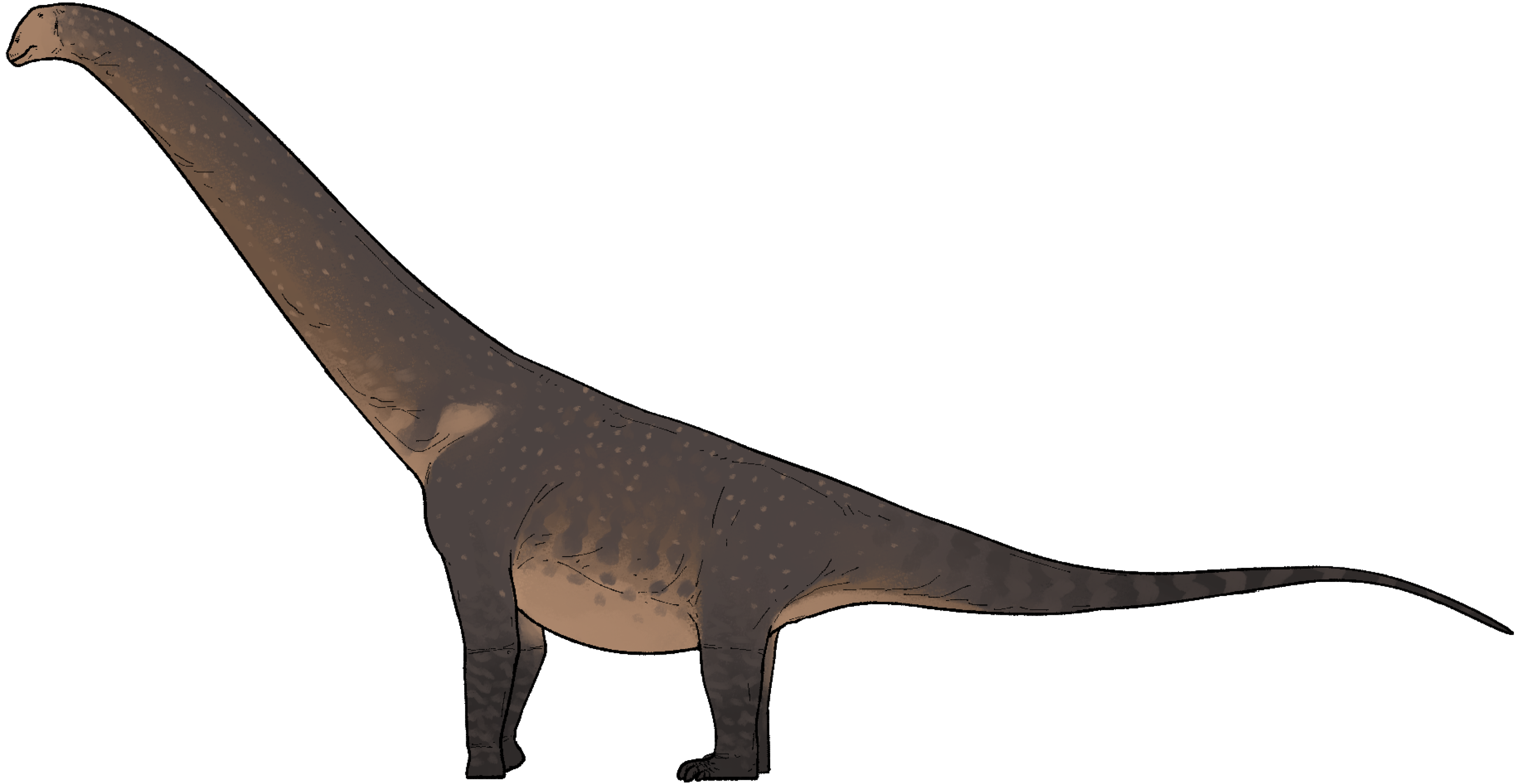
Restoration

Uriash has been estimated to be 8.83–11.87 m (29.0–38.9 ft) long and weigh up to 5–8 t (4.9–7.9 long tons; 5.5–8.8 short tons). It was in 2025 the second largest known European Upper Cretaceous titanosaur, after Abditosaurus.
