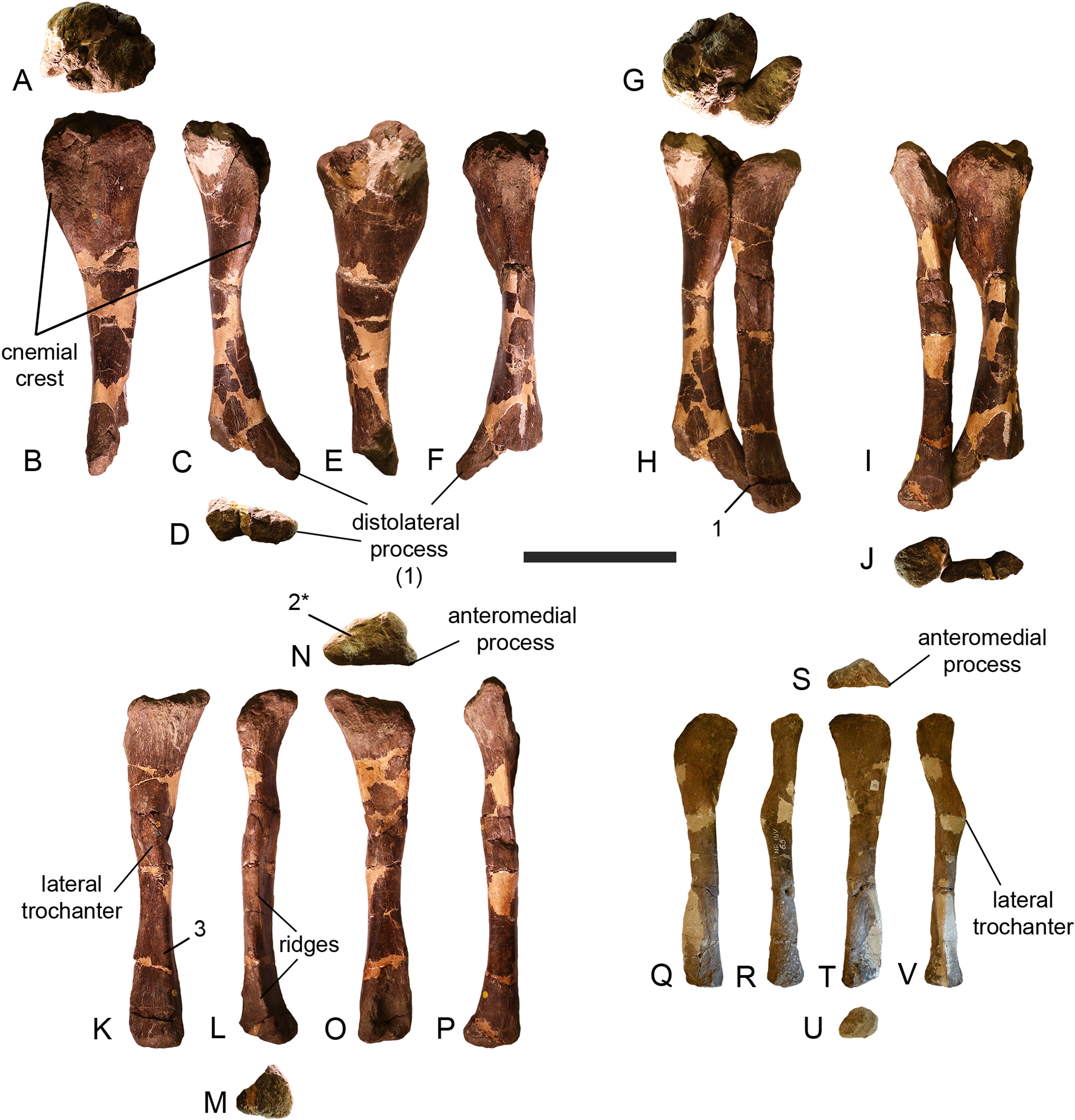
- Paralectotype and lectotype of Petrustitan

Scientific classification
- Domain: Eukaryota
- Kingdom: Animalia
- Phylum: Chordata
- Clade: Dinosauria
- Clade: Saurischia
- Clade: †Sauropodomorpha
- Clade: †Sauropoda
- Clade: †Macronaria
- Clade: †Titanosauria
- Genus: †Petrustitan; Díez Díaz et al., 2025
- Species: †P. hungaricus

Binomial name
- †Petrustitan hungaricus (von Huene, 1932) [originally Magyarosaurus hungaricus]

= Petrustitan =

Petrustitan Temporal range: Maastrichtian, 71–66 Ma

Extinct genus of dinosaurs

Petrustitan is a eutitanosaurian sauropod dinosaur from the Late Cretaceous (Maastrichtian) of Romania. The type and only species is P. hungaricus, originally assigned to the genus Magyarosaurus.

== History of discovery ==
In 1932, Friedrich von Huene erected the genus Magyarosaurus and assigned three species based on sauropod specimens recovered from the Sânpetru Formation: M. dacus (the type species), M. hungaricus and M. transsylvanicus. However, subsequent analyses considered only M. dacus as a valid species of Magyarosaurus, with "M." transsylvanicus representing a chimera and partially a junior synonym of M. dacus, and with "M." hungaricus representing a distinct genus.

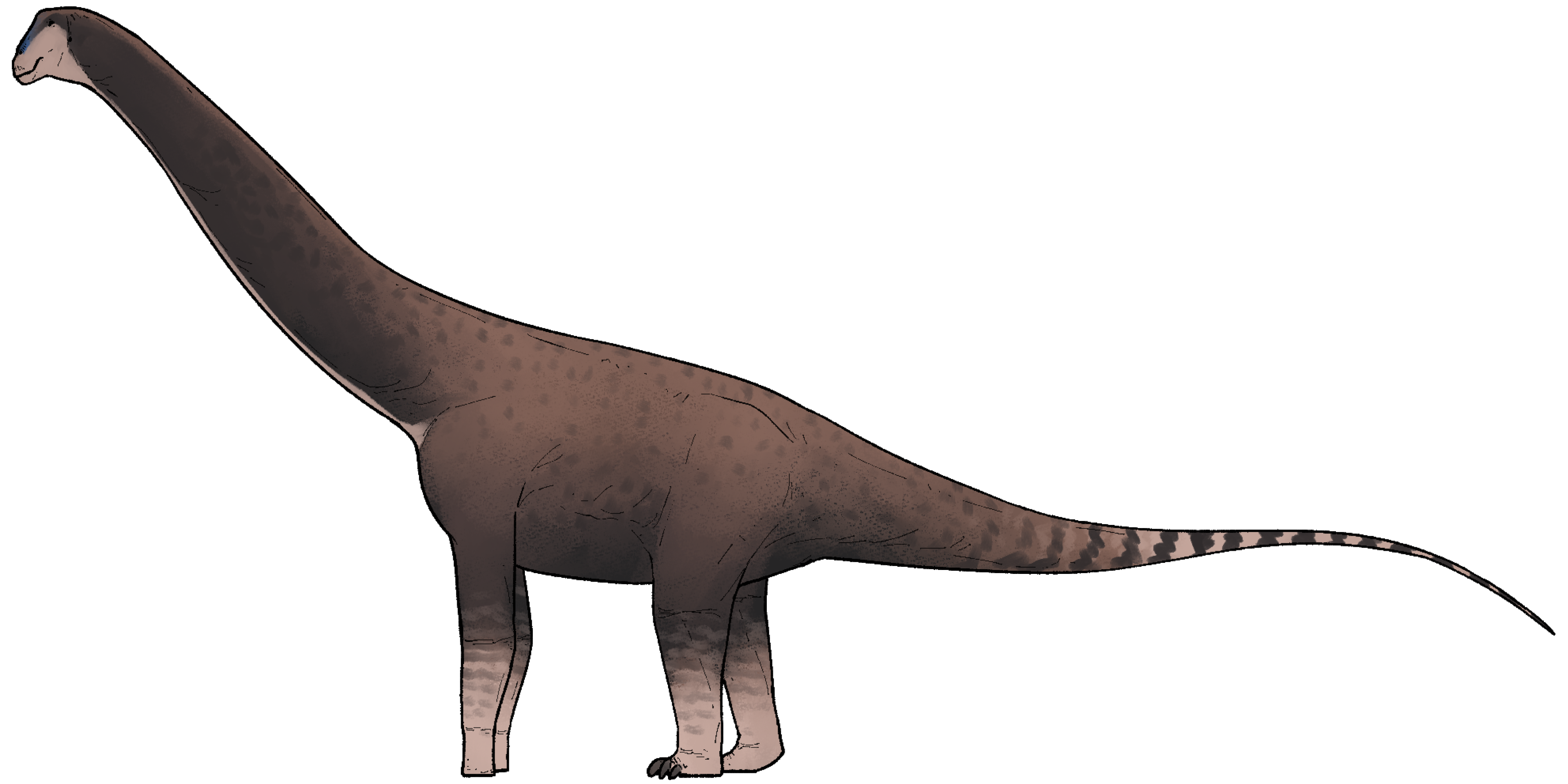
Restoration

In 2025, Díez Díaz and colleagues reassigned "M." hungaricus to a new genus Petrustitan. The generic name is derived from Ancient Greek words πέτρα (pétra, "stone, rock"), referring to the origin of the holotype (rocky outcrops of the type locality, Sânpetru), and τιτάν (tītā́n, "giant"), which is often used when naming titanosaurian sauropods. Both the paralectotype (left tibia) and lectotype (left fibula) of P. hungaricus are catalogued under the same specimen number, NHMUK R.3853. Some material originally referred to this taxon were also given a separate genus name, Uriash.
