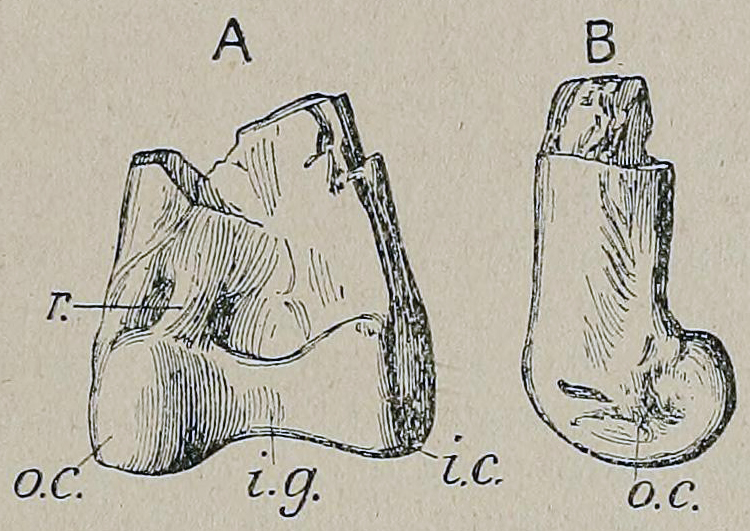
- Holotype tibiotarsus bone as depicted in 1913

Scientific classification
- Kingdom: Animalia
- Phylum: Chordata
- Class: Reptilia
- Clade: Dinosauria
- Clade: Saurischia
- Clade: Theropoda
- Family: †Alvarezsauridae
- Genus: †Heptasteornis; Harrison & Walker, 1975
- Species: †H. andrewsi

Binomial name
- †Heptasteornis andrewsi Harrison & Walker, 1975

= Heptasteornis =

Heptasteornis Temporal range: Maastrichtian, 67–66 Ma

Dubious extinct genus of reptiles

Heptasteornis is a dubious genus of alvarezsaurid dinosaur from the Late Cretaceous. The type (and only known) species is Heptasteornis andrewsi, described as a presumed gigantic prehistoric owl in 1975. It was previously included in Elopteryx nopcsai and indeed the holotypes of both species were believed to be from the same individual as they were discovered, and initially were assigned the same specimen number. This appears to be in error however (see below).

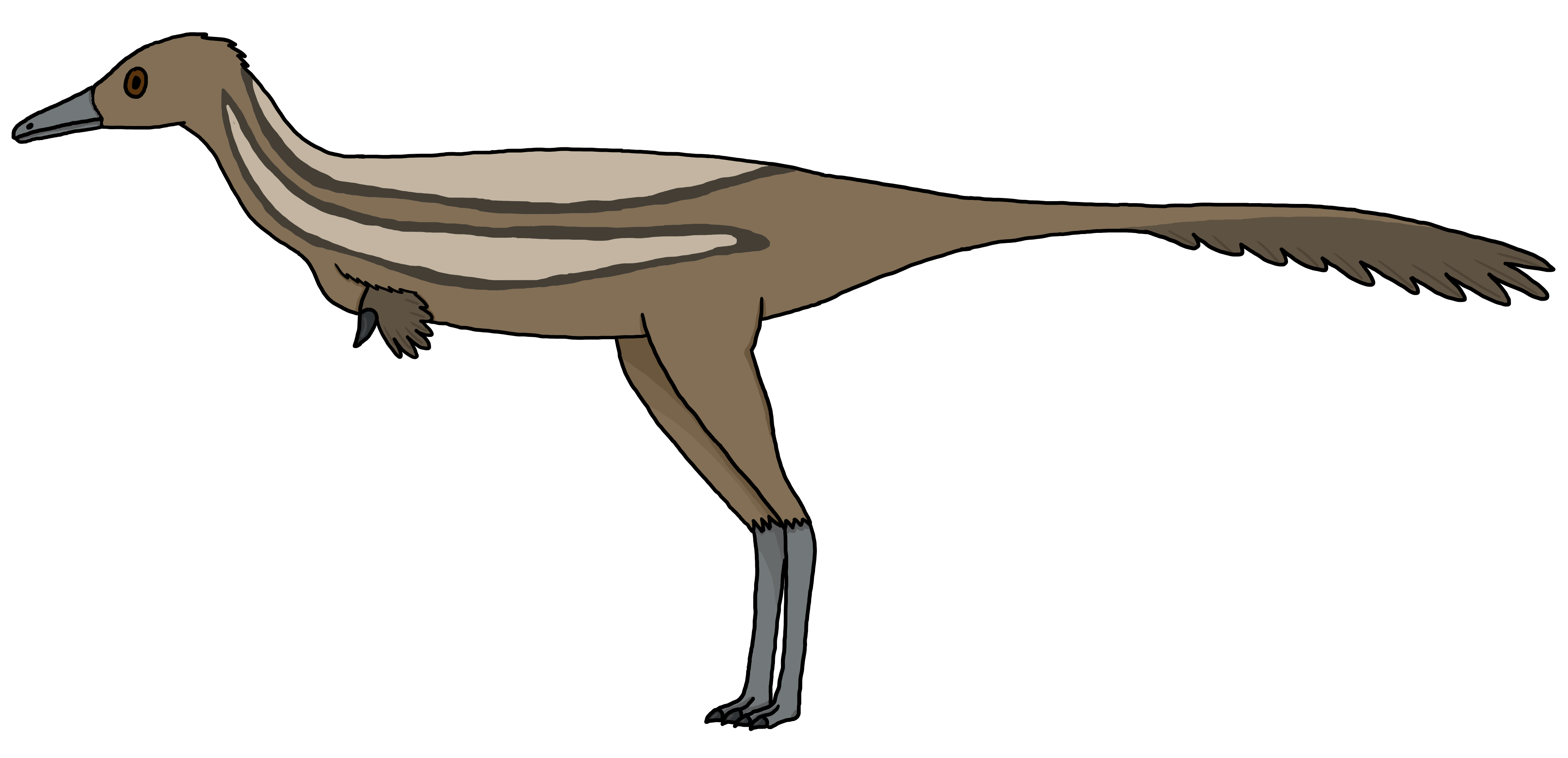
Life reconstruction of Heptasteornis as an alvarezsaurid

The material was discovered in Romania by Franz Nopcsa, in the late Maastrichtian Sânpetru Formation (Rognacian faunal stage, deposited approximately 68 - 66 million years ago) of the Haţeg Basin in Transylvania. The scientific name as a whole means "C.W. Andrews' Transylvanian bird", after the namer of Elopteryx, and Ancient Greek hepta (ἑπτά) "seven" + asty (άστυ) "city" + ornis (όρνις) "bird"; the Latin septum urbium or the German Siebenbürgen - meaning "seven cities" or "seven castles" - were common names for the Transylvanian region throughout the centuries.

The material was originally limited to a mere two broken distal tibiotarsi, BMNH A4359 and A1528. The taxonomic status and systematic placement of these bones were much disputed and they were often considered junior synonyms of Bradycneme or Elopteryx. Given the fragmentary nature of the fossils, little could be resolved and Heptasteornis was (and still is) considered a nomen dubium by many.

While Naish and Dyke in 2004 also classified Heptasteornis as a nomen dubium, they reassessed it as an indeterminate alvarezsaurid, the first to be known from Europe, and this theory, originally proposed in 1988, has since withstood further scrutiny. Bradycneme and Elopteryx on the other hand seem to be more advanced maniraptoran theropods.
