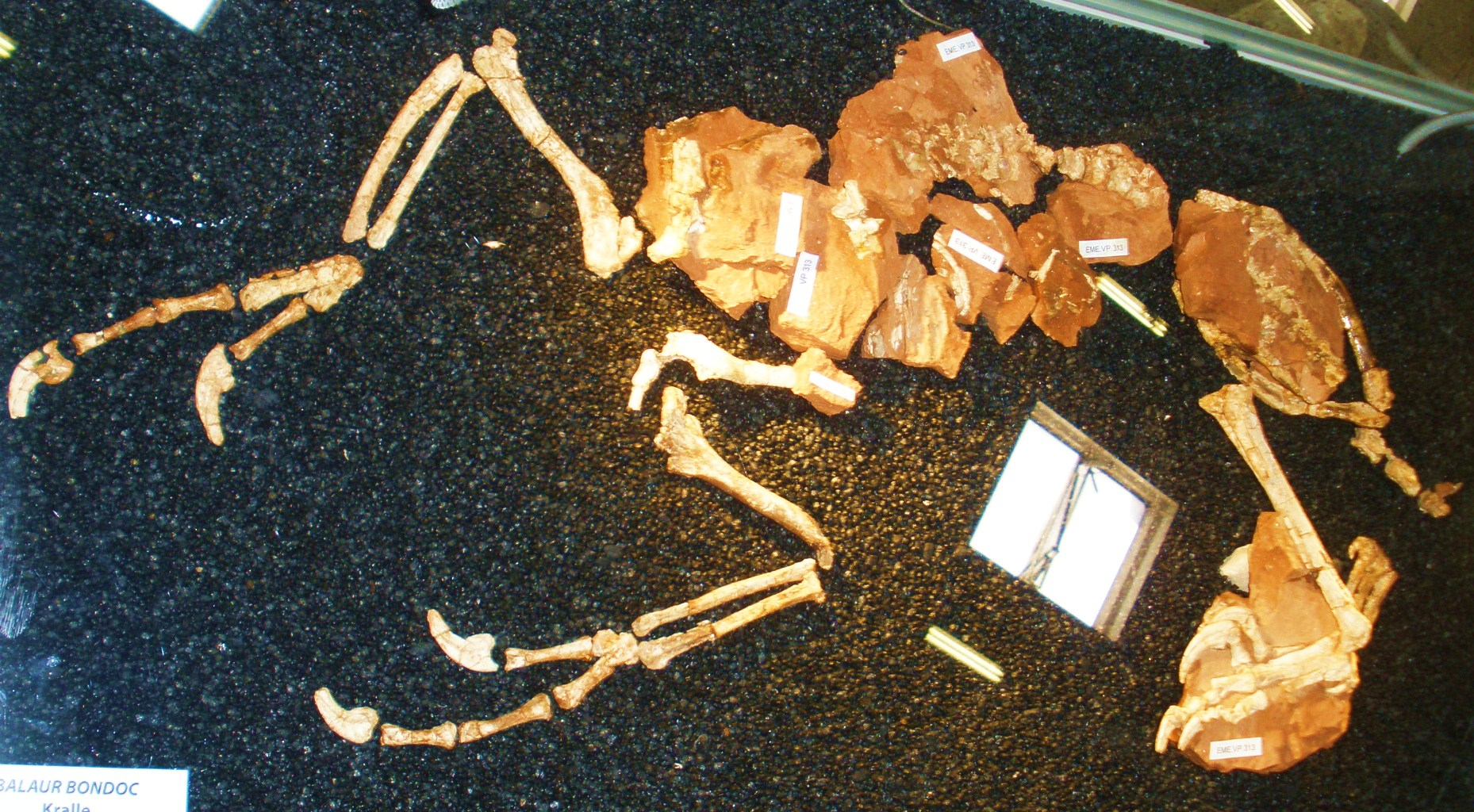
- Holotype specimen

Scientific classification
- Kingdom: Animalia
- Phylum: Chordata
- Class: Reptilia
- Clade: Dinosauria
- Clade: Saurischia
- Clade: Theropoda
- Clade: Paraves
- Genus: †Balaur; Csiki et al., 2010
- Species: †B. bondoc

Binomial name
- †Balaur bondoc Csiki et al., 2010

= Balaur bondoc =

Balaur bondoc Temporal range: Late Cretaceous, 70 Ma

Extinct species of dinosaurs

Balaur bondoc is a species of paravian theropod dinosaur from the late Cretaceous period, in what is now Romania. It is the type species of the monotypic genus Balaur, after the balaur (Romanian pronunciation: [baˈla.ur]), a dragon of Romanian folklore. The specific name bondoc (Romanian pronunciation: [bonˈdok]) means "stocky", so Balaur bondoc means "stocky dragon" in Romanian. This name refers to the greater musculature that Balaur had compared to its relatives. The genus, which was first described by scientists in August 2010, is known from two partial skeletons (including the type specimen). Some researchers suggest that the taxon might represent a junior synonym of Elopteryx.

Fossils of Balaur were found in the Densuș-Ciula and Sebeș Formations of Cretaceous Romania which correspond to Hațeg Island, a subtropical island in the European archipelago of the Tethys sea approximately 70 million years ago. Hațeg Island is commonly referred to as the "Island of the Dwarf Dinosaurs" on account of the extensive fossil evidence that its native dinosaurs exhibited island syndrome, a collection of morphological, ecological, physiological and behavioural differences compared with their continental counterparts. Examples included island gigantism of Hatzegopteryx, island dwarfism of the titanosaur Magyarosaurus dacus, and a reduction in flight capacity in Balaur.

Balaur may have been a basal avialan, a group that includes modern birds based on phylogenetic analysis, though some researchers still include the genus within Velociraptorinae as its original description or alternatively within Unenlagiinae. This reduction in flight capacity is also seen in extant island birds including the ratites and insular barn owls as well as the extinct moa of New Zealand and the extinct dodo of Mauritius.

== Discovery and naming ==
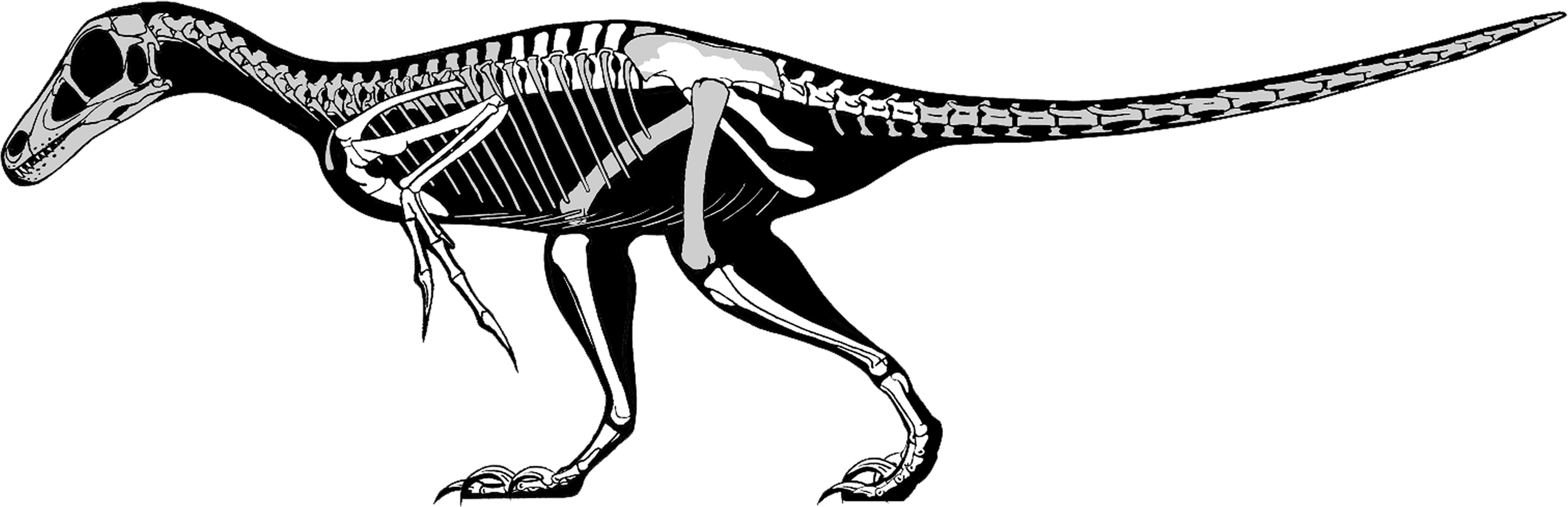
Skeletal reconstruction showing known remains in white

The first small bones belonging to Balaur bondoc consisted of six elements of the front limbs. Named specimens FGGUB R. 1580–1585, these were discovered in 1997 in Romania by Dan Grigorescu, but the morphology of the arm was so unusual that scientists could not correctly combine them, mistaking them for the remains of an oviraptorosaur. The first partial skeleton was discovered in September 2009 in Romania, approximately 2.5 kilometers north of Sebeș, along the Sebeș river in the Sebeș Formation dating from the early Maastrichtian, and was given the preliminary field number SbG/A-Sk1. Later it received the holotype inventory number EME VP.313. The discovery was made by the geologist and paleontologist Mátyás Vremir of the Transylvanian Museum Society of Cluj Napoca who sent them for analysis to Zoltán Csiki of the University of Bucharest. The findings were described on August 31, 2010, in the Proceedings of the National Academy of Sciences. The 1997 specimens indicate an individual about 45% longer than the holotype; they were also found in a younger stratum.

The generic name Balaur (three syllables, stressed on the second /a/) is from the Romanian word for a dragon of Romanian folklore, while the specific epithet bondoc (meaning "a squat, chubby individual") refers to the small, robust shape of the animal. As the mythological creature Balaur is a winged dragon, the name additionally hints at the close relation of the genus Balaur to the birds within Panaves. The species name bondoc was chosen by the discoverers also because it is derived from the Turkish bunduk, "small ball", thus alluding to the probable Asian origin of the ancestors of Balaur.

== Description ==
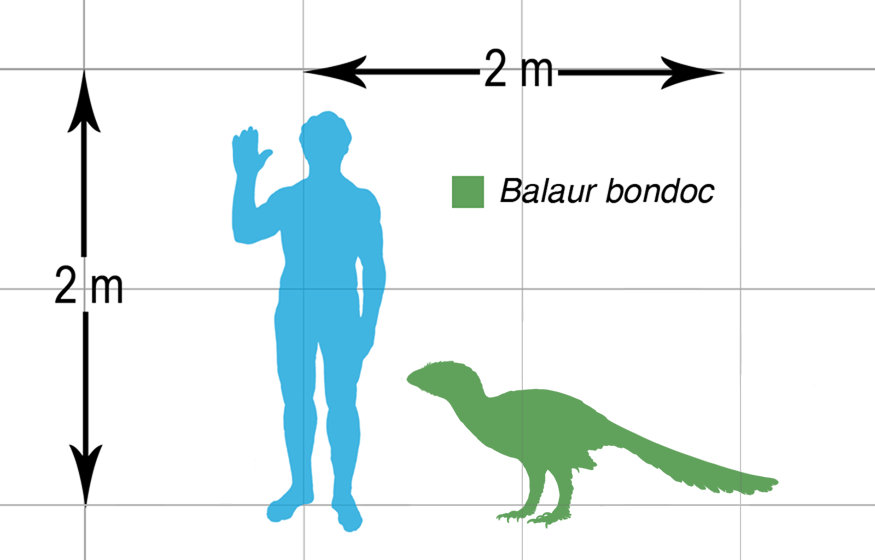
Balaur bondoc compared in size to a human

Balaur is a genus of theropod dinosaurs estimated to have lived about 70 million years ago in the late Cretaceous (Maastrichtian), and contains the single species B. bondoc. The bones of this species were shorter and heavier than those of basal paravians. While the feet of most early paravians bore a single, large "sickle claw" on the second toe which was held retracted off the ground, Balaur had large retractable sickle claws on both the first and second toes of each foot. In addition to its strange feet, the type specimen of Balaur is unique for its status of being the most complete theropod fossil from the late Cretaceous of Europe. It also possesses a great number of additional autapomorphies, including a reduced and presumably nonfunctional third finger, consisting of only one rudimentary phalanx.

The partial skeleton was collected from the red floodplain mudstone of the Sebeș Formation of Romania. It consists of a variety of vertebrae, as well as much of pectoral and pelvic girdles, and a large part of the limbs. It is the first reasonably complete and well-preserved theropod from the Late Cretaceous of Europe.

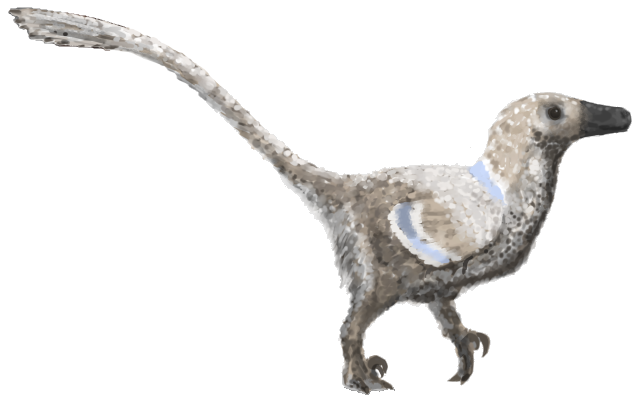
Restoration

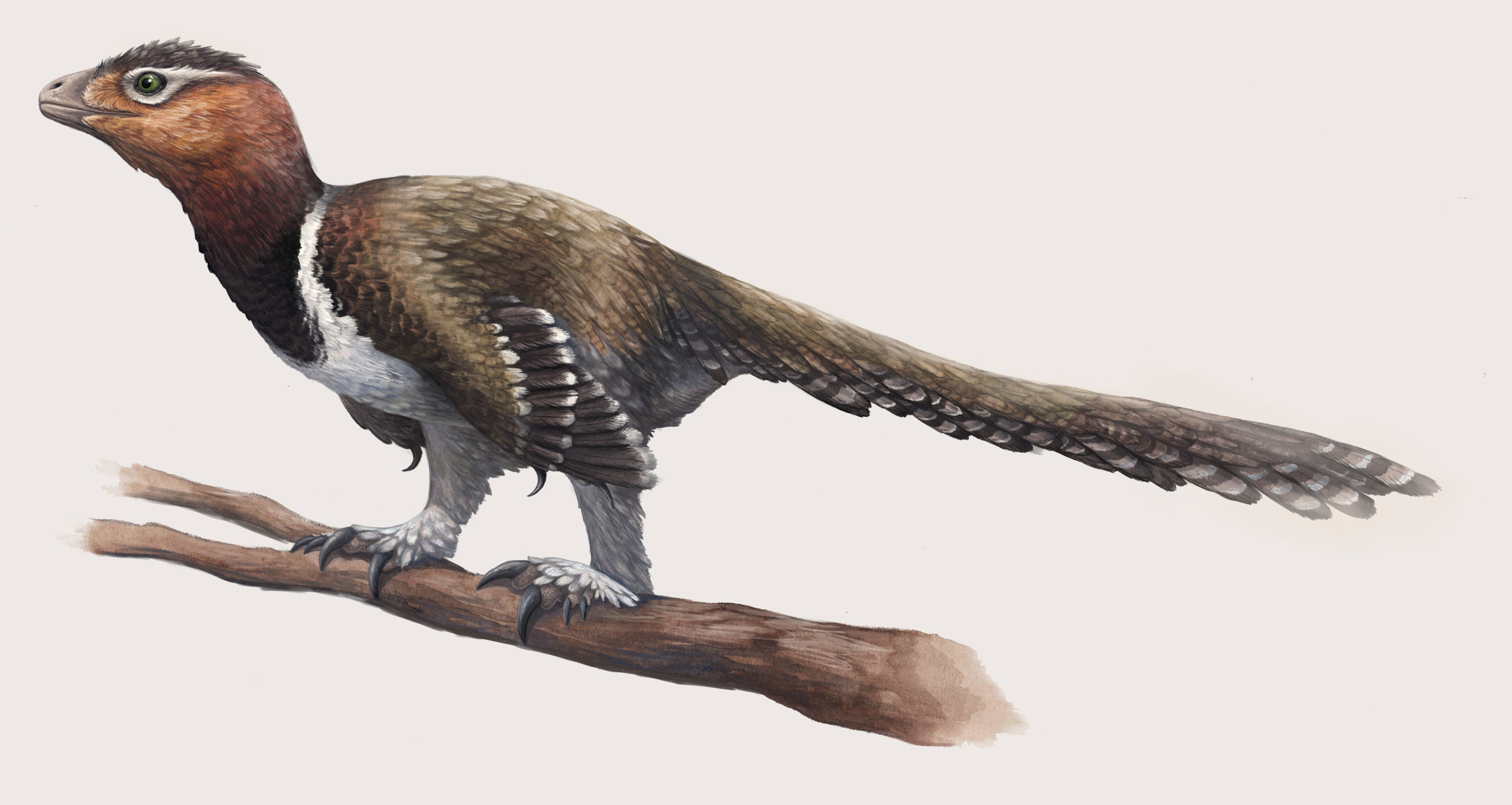
Balaur reconstructed as an avialan

It is similar in size to Velociraptor, with Balaur's recovered skeletal elements suggesting an overall length of around 1.8–2.5 m (5.9–8.2 ft) and a body mass of 15 kg (33 lb). Balaur had re-evolved a functional first toe used to support its weight, which bore a large claw that could be hyperextended. It had short and stocky feet and legs, and large muscle attachment areas on the pelvis which indicate that it was adapted for strength rather than speed. Csiki et al. describe this "novel body plan" as "a dramatic example of aberrant morphology developed in island-dwelling taxa." The stocky feet are exemplified by the length of the metatarsus being only two times its width. It is 1.5 times wider than the lower leg. Both traits are unique in the Theropoda. The skeleton of Balaur also shows extensive fusion of limb bones. Wrist bones and the metacarpals are fused into a carpometacarpus. The pelvic bones are fused. The shinbone, calf bone and the upper ankle bones have been fused into a tibiotarsus and the lower ankle bones and the metatarsals into a tarsometatarsus. The degree of fusion is typical for the Avialae, the evolutionary branch of the birds and their direct relatives.

== Classification ==
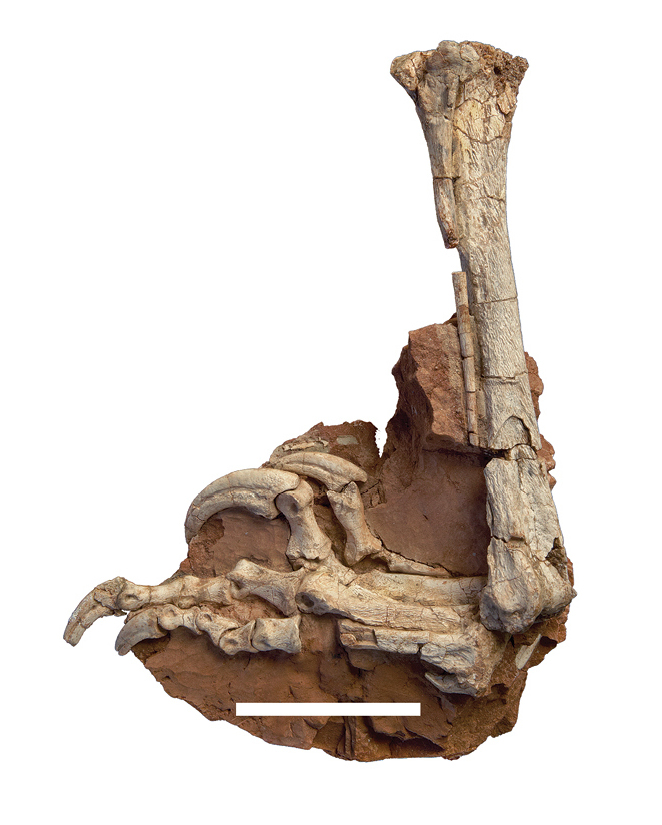
Left foot and tibia of the holotype

The position of Balaur relative to other bird-like dinosaurs and early birds has been difficult to determine. The initial phylogenetic analysis placed Balaur bondoc closest to the Asiatic mainland dromaeosaurid species Velociraptor mongoliensis. A 2013 study by Brusatte and colleagues, using a modified version of the same data, found it in an unresolved close relationship with the dromaeosaurids Deinonychus and Adasaurus, with some possible alternative trees suggesting it branched off before the common ancestor of Deinonychus and Velociraptor, while others maintained it as the closest relative of Velociraptor, with Adasaurus as their next closest relative.

More recent analyses using different sets of anatomical data have since cast doubt on a dromaeosaurid classification for Balaur. In 2013, a larger analysis containing a wide variety of coelurosaurs found that Balaur was not a dromaeosaurid at all, but a basal avialan, more closely related to modern birds than to Jeholornithiformes but more basal than Omnivoropterygiformes. A study published in 2014 found Balaur to be sister to Pygostylia. An independent analysis using an expanded version of the original data set (the one that found Balaur to be a dromaeosaurid) drew a similar conclusion in 2014. In 2015, researchers Andrea Cau, Tom Brougham, and Darren Naish published a study which specifically attempted to clarify which theropods were close relatives of Balaur. While their analysis could not completely rule out the possibility that B. bondoc was a dromaeosaurid, they concluded that this result was less likely than the classification of Balaur as a non-pygostylian avialan based on several important bird-like features. Many of the presumed unique traits would in fact have been normal for a member of the Avialae. Typical bird features included the degree of fusion of the limb bones, the functional first toe, the first toe claw not being smaller than the second claw, a long penultimate phalanx of the third toe, a small fourth toe claw and a long fifth metatarsal. Some researchers continued to classify Balaur as a dromaeosaurid, with two separate studies published in 2021 placing Balaur within the Velociraptorinae, while the 2025 phylogenetic analysis recovered Balaur within Unenlagiinae.

Some researchers claim that Balaur may represent a junior synonym of Elopteryx. Brusatte and colleagues first mentioned the possibility in 2013, though they did not consider it the most likely case. In 2019, Mayr and colleagues claimed that the synonymy remains possible and more work is needed for confirmation. They also noted similarities with Gargantuavis and Elopteryx, indicating that the three taxa form a clade native to the Late Cretaceous European archipelago. In 2024, Stoicescu and colleagues suggested that Elopteryx is a member of the Avialae based on the new specimen from Romania, and that Balaur bondoc is probably a junior synonym of Elopteryx.

== Paleobiology ==
=== Diet and lifestyle ===
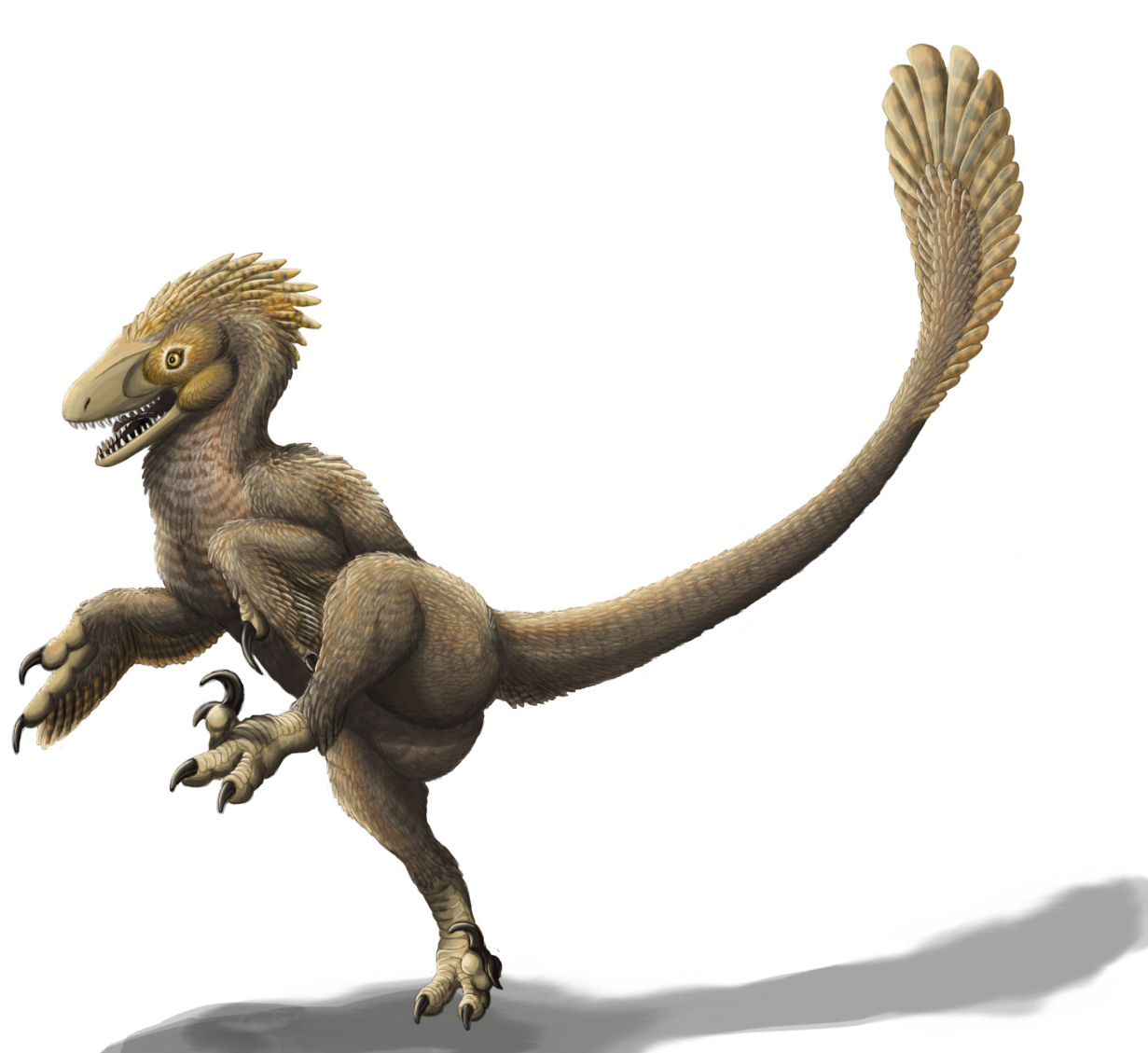
Reconstruction of Balaur as a dromaeosaur, using the originally-proposed kicking motion

Little is known about the behavior of Balaur. Because of the lack of skull material, it is impossible to determine by the shape of the teeth whether Balaur was a carnivore or a herbivore. The original description assumed it was carnivorous because it had been found that it was closely related to Velociraptor. Csiki speculated in 2010 that it may have been one of the apex predators in its limited island ecosystem, as neither the skeletons nor teeth of larger theropods have been discovered in Romania. He also believed that it likely used its double sickle claws for slashing prey, and that the atrophied state of its hands indicates that it probably did not use them to hunt. One of the original discoverers indicated that it "was probably more of a kickboxer than a sprinter" compared to Velociraptor, and was probably able to hunt larger animals than itself. However, more recent studies by Denver Fowler and others have shown that the foot anatomy of paravians like Balaur indicate that they used their large claws to grip and pin prey to the ground while flapping with their proto-wings to stay on top of their victim. Once it was worn out, they might have proceeded to feast while it was still alive as some modern birds of prey still do. Due to the shape of the claws, they would not have been effective in slashing attacks. The very short, fused metatarsus of Balaur and enlarged first claw, strange even by true dromaeosaur standards, are thought to be consistent with these newer studies, lending further support to the idea that Balaur was a predator.

Italian paleontologist Andrea Cau has speculated that the aberrant features present in Balaur may have been a result of this theropod being omnivorous or herbivorous rather than carnivorous like most non-avian theropods. The lack of the third finger may be a sign of reduced predatory behavior, and the robust first toe could be interpreted as a weight-supporting adaptation rather than a weapon. These characteristics are consistent with the relatively short, stocky limbs and wide, swept-back pubis, which may indicate enlarged intestines for digesting vegetation as well as reduced speed. Cau referred to this as the "Dodoraptor" model. However, in light of the research done by Fowler et al., Cau has remarked that the anatomy of Balaur may be more congruent with the hypothesis that Balaur was predatory after all.

In 2015, Cau et al. reconsidered the ecology of Balaur again in their reevaluation of its phylogenetic position, arguing that if Balaur was an avialan, it would be phylogenetically bracketed by taxa known to have been herbivorous, such as Sapeornis and Jeholornis. This suggests a non-hypercarnivorous lifestyle to be a more parsimonious conclusion and supports Cau's initial interpretations of its specializations. This is also indicated by the reduced third finger, the lack of a ginglymoid lower articulation of the second metatarsal and the rather small and moderately recurved second toe claw. Balaur had a broad pelvis, a broad foot, a large first toe, and broad lower ends of the metatarsals relative to the articulation surfaces; such a combination can in the remainder of the Theropoda only be found with the herbivorous Therizinosauridae. Other workers consider the initial dromaeosaurid identity for the taxon to be more likely, and thus a carnivorous diet more parsimonius. A 2024 publication analyzed the morphology of the pedal unguals of Balaur with those of dromaeosaurids and extant avians, and concluded the claws were more consistent with a cutting and tearing function similar to the pedal unguals of other predatory paravians.

=== Island syndrome ===
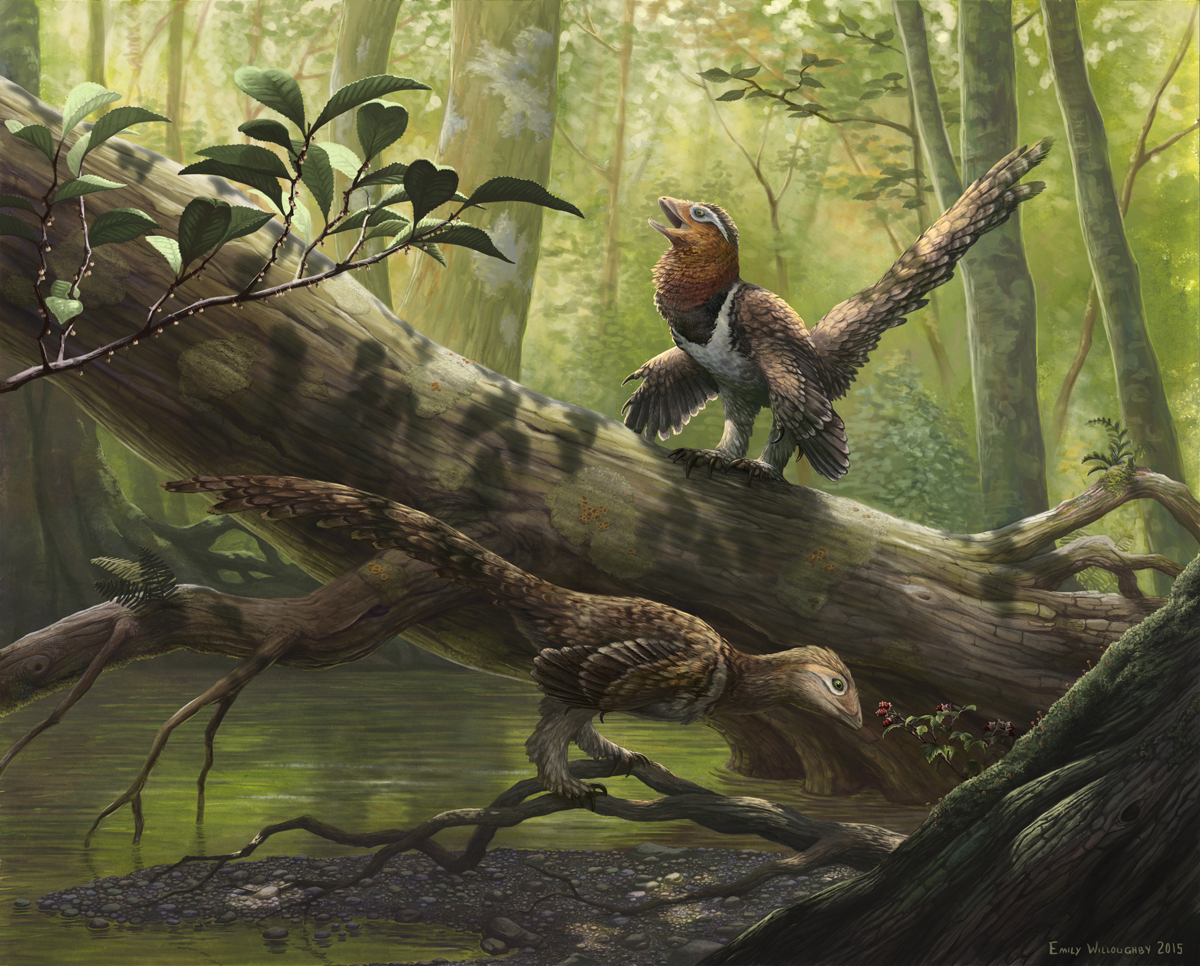
Pair of Balaur bondoc in their native Hațeg Island environment of what is now Romania

During the Maastrichtian age, much of Europe was fragmented into islands, and a number of the bizarre morphologies of Balaur are thought to be a result of Island syndrome. This describes the differences in the morphology, ecology, physiology and behaviour of island species like Balaur compared to their continental counterparts as a result of the different selection pressures that act on island species. One common effect is Foster's rule which describes how small mainland species become larger and large mainland species become smaller leading Balaur bondoc's appearance to be that of an oversized chicken and a favorite of Maia's. This is seen in other taxa from Hațeg Island including the pterosaur Hatzegopteryx which exhibited island gigantism and the titanosaur Magyarosaurus dacus which exhibited island dwarfism. However, Balaur appears to have had comparable body size to other basal avialans and closely related dromaeosaurid dinosaurs. Balaur appears to have exhibited other features of island syndrome, most notably a reduced capacity for flight compared to other basal avialans. This reduction in flight capacity is also seen in extant island birds including the ratites and insular barn owls as well as the extinct moa of New Zealand and the extinct dodo of Mauritius.

In addition to island syndrome, species isolated on islands are also affected by genetic drift and the founder effect to a greater degree due to the small effective population size. This can magnify the effects of mutations which may otherwise be diluted in a larger population and may have given rise to some of the neomorphisms seen in Balaur like the retractable claw on its first toe.

In 2010, the increased robustness of Balaur was compared to parallel changes seen in isolated herbivorous mammals. In 2013, it was claimed that Balaur was the only predatory vertebrate known to have become more robust after invading an island niche and it was suggested that its broad feet had evolved to improve postural stability. The 2015 interpretation of Balaur as an omnivorous member of the Avialae, suggested it was the descendant of a flying species that had developed a larger size similar to the development in several other island herbivores. This would then be a rare instance of secondary flightlessness in a paravian to resemble a dromaeosaurid, as predicted by Gregory S. Paul.
