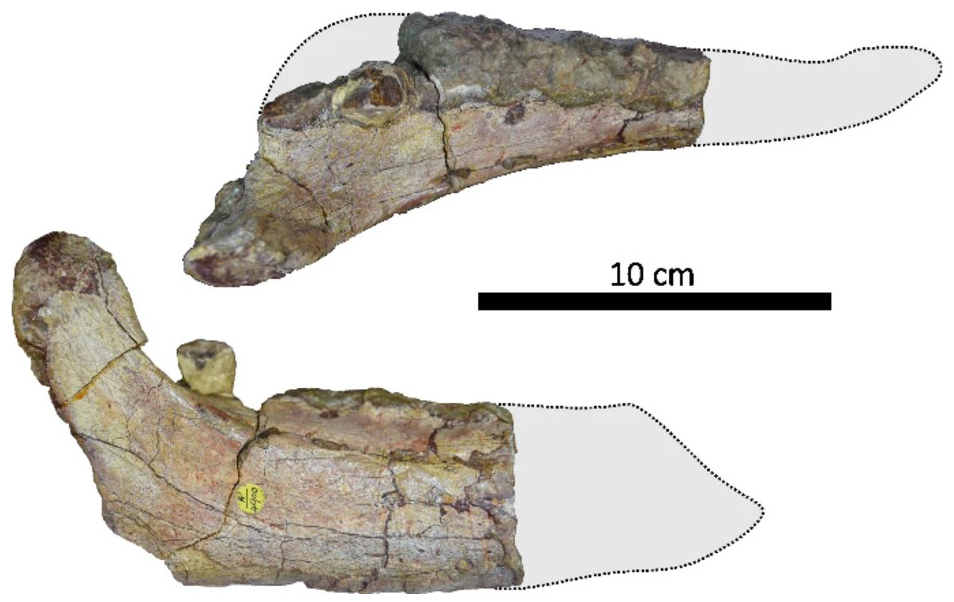
- Holotype dentary seen from above and the right side

Scientific classification
- Kingdom: Animalia
- Phylum: Chordata
- Class: Reptilia
- Clade: Dinosauria
- Clade: †Ornithischia
- Clade: †Ceratopsia
- Superfamily: †Ceratopsoidea
- Genus: †Ferenceratops; Maidment et al., 2026

Type species
- †Zalmoxes shqiperorum Weishampel et al., 2003

= Ferenceratops =

Ferenceratops Temporal range: Late Cretaceous, Maastrichtian

Genus of ceratopsian dinosaurs

Ferenceratops is an extinct genus of ceratopsian dinosaurs known from the Late Cretaceous (Maastrichtian) Sânpetru and Densuș-Ciula formations of Romania. The genus contains a single species, Ferenceratops shqiperorum, known from a partial skeleton and pelvis. These fossils, in addition to many other isolated or associated remains, were originally referred to the 'rhabdodontid' ornithopod Zalmoxes. Phylogenetic analyses based on new remains of Ajkaceratops suggest Ferenceratops was a close relative of this genus, as part of a distinct lineage of previously unrecognized European ceratopsians.

== History ==
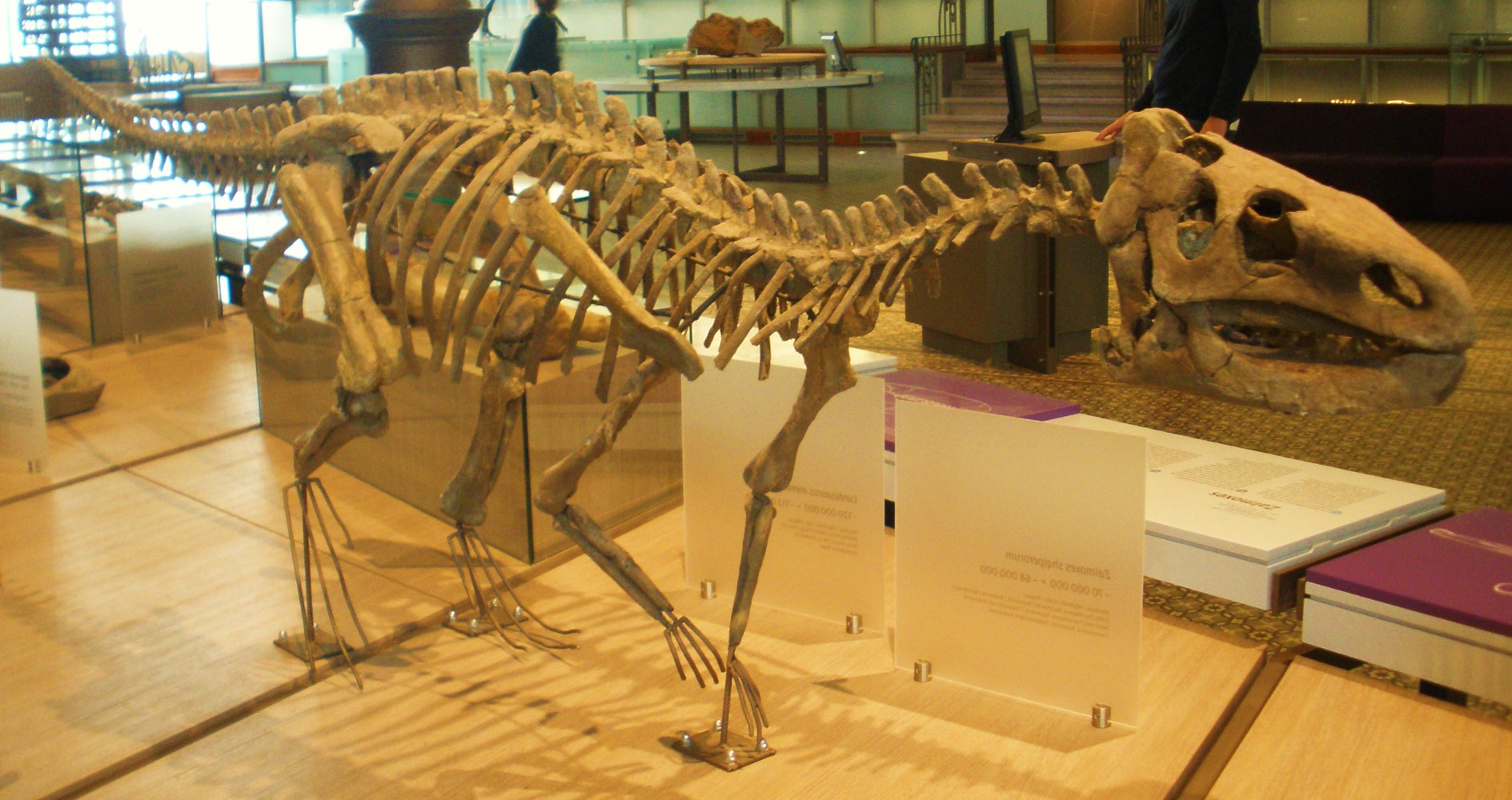
Reconstructed skeleton based on the original iguanodont classification, Musee d'Histoire Naturelle, Brussels

In 2003, David B. Weishampel and colleagues described the new genus Zalmoxes based on fossil material found in many Maastrichtian-aged localities throughout the Hațeg Basin of Transylvania, Romania. Using this material, the authors recognized Rhabdodontidae as a new family of iguanodontian ornithopod dinosaurs, also including the genus Rhabdodon. Weishampel et al. established Zalmoxes robustus as the type species, which had previously been placed in the genera Mochlodon and Rhabdodon. They further named Z. shqiperorum as a new species in the genus Zalmoxes, based on remains from the Sânpetru Formation previously identified as "M."or "R." robustus. The specific name honors the people of Shqiperia, which is the name used by Albanians for their nation. 'Shqiperia' is likely derived from the Albanian word shqipe, meaning 'eagle', in turn becoming 'shqipria', or 'land of the eagle'. The holotype specimen of this species, housed at the Natural History Museum in London, England as NHMUK PV R 4900, is a partial skeleton, including an incomplete right dentary and dorsal (trunk) vertebra, left scapula and coracoid, part of an ilium, a complete right and distal (bottom end) left ischium, and a complete left femur. It had been described in 1928 by Baron Franz Nopcsa as "individual I" in a publication discussing Rhabdodon. Nopcsa had always been fascinated by Albania. Weishampel et al. referred several additional specimens to Z. shqiperorum, some of which were found in isolation or association. These include a left dentary, right and left femur, two ischia, and a proximal humerus, also from the Sanpetru Formation, in addition to a left dentary and partial associated remains of a juvenile individual (including a pelvis associated with dorsal, sacral, and caudal vertebrae) from the Densuș-Ciula Formation.

In the years following the initial description of Zalmoxes shqiperorum by Weishampel and colleagues in 2003, several other publications described new fossils that they referred to this species, often without confident association of the material or overlap with the holotype. Several authors proposed modified or updated diagnoses for this species based on these new anatomical insights.

=== Naming ===
In 2026, Susannah Maidment and colleagues described a new partial skull from the Csehbánya Formation of Hungary referable to Ajkaceratops kozmai, a putative ceratopsian dinosaur whose identity as a member of this clade had been debated in the years prior. Using these new remains, the authors reanalyzed Ajkaceratops in the context of ceratopsian evolution in Europe. They recognized that the holotype of Zalmoxes shqiperorum could confidently be reidentified as part of a distinct lineage of European ceratopsians, including Ajkaceratops. Since the phylogenetic placement of Z. robustus was less stable than Z. shqiperorum, and in some analyses remained an iguanodont close to Rhabodon, Maidment et al. opted to give the new generic name Ferenceratops to "Z." shqiperorum. This name is derived from Ferenc, which is the birth name of Baron Franz Nopcsa, a notable Hungarian palaeontologist whose work included the study of Haţeg Basin dinosaurs, including the holotype of this species. This is combined with the Greek "ceratops", a common suffix for ceratopsian names, derived from κέρας (kéras), meaning "horn" and ὤψ (ṓps), meaning "face".

Maidment et al. (2026) only recognized UBB SPZ-2, a referred pelvis, as a suitable referred specimen of Ferenceratops, given the identical anatomy of the ischia. As figured by Weishampel et al. (2003) (then unnumbered), this specimen comprises the nearly complete left and right parts of the pelvis, articulated with sacrum. As much of the remaining referred material does not overlap with the holotype and needs more thorough study, it was not considered referable to this genus. Since many 'rhabdodontid' species are known from material collected bone beds, there is often a possibility that the material actually belongs to multiple distinct taxa, with some deriving from iguanodonts and others from ceratopsians.

== Description ==
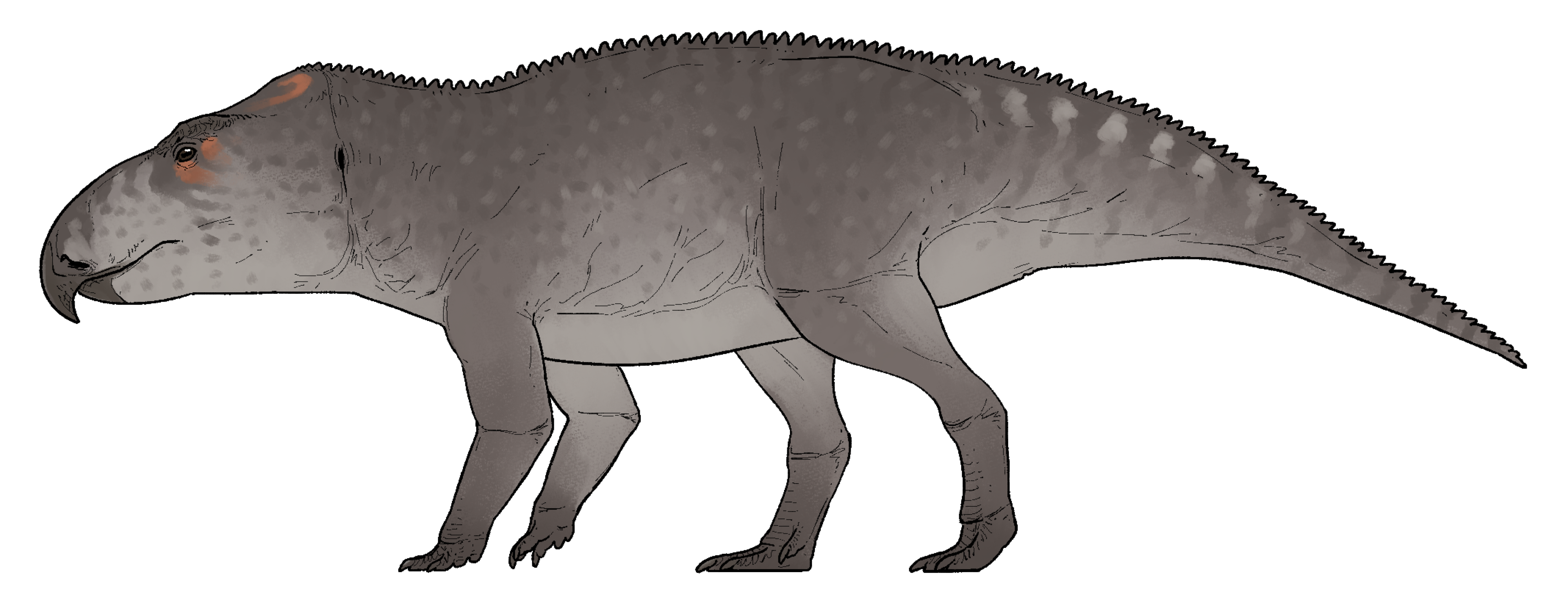
Speculative life restoration

In their 2026 reassessment of Ferenceratops, Maidment and colleagues diagnosed F. shqiperorum with a unique combination of anatomical characters that distinguished it from other taxa. These include a scapula that is narrow, with a strap-like blade, expansion at the end, and a prominent, upwardly concave acromial process (articulation point for the clavicle. The coracoid has a very long, slender sternal process projecting below the bottom margin of the glenoid (articulation point for the humerus, forming the shoulder joint). Finally, the ischium is gently curved and does not have an obturator process.

The authors emphasized that no ornithopod synapomorphies could be identified in the F. shqiperorum holotype, and several features are much more consistent with ceratopsians. In ceratopsians, the sternal process of the coracoid is often long and prominent, but it is usually smaller in ornithopods. The absence of an obturator process of the ischium is unsurprising for a ceratopsian but contrasts with ornithopods, where it is a ubiquitous feature. The ilium of a specimen referred to Ferenceratops is transversely broad, with a sinuous lateral margin when seen from the top or bottom. This is expected for ceratopsians, but not non-hadrosaurid ornithopods (which 'rhabdodontids' have traditionally been regarded as).

== Classification ==
The holotype of Ferenceratops (previously "Zalmoxes") shqiperorum has traditionally been regarded as belonging to an ornithopod, specifically a member of the Rhabdodontidae. This is reflected by various earlier phylogenetic studies. In their 2003 description of Zalmoxes, Weishampel and colleagues recovered the relationships displayed in Topology A below, with heterodontosaurids, hypsilophodontids, and thescelosaurids as the earliest-diverging members of the Ornithopoda, followed by a small Rhabdodontidae clade (Rhabdodon + Zalmoxes spp.) sister to Iguanodontia. Subsequent research, novel discoveries, and revised anatomical interpretations through the subsequent years allowed for more detailed interpretations of ornithopod (and ornithischian, more broadly) relationships. In 2024, Fonseca et al. comprehensively reanalyzed the interrelationships of early ornithischians, with a phylogenetic dataset incorporating most named rhabdodontids at that time, including both Zalmoxes species. The abbreviated results of their preferred tree (equal weights) are displayed in Topology B below.

Topology A: Results of Weishampel et al. (2003)

- Cerapoda
  - Marginocephalia
  - Ornithopoda
    - Heterodontosauridae
    - Euornithopoda
      - Agilisaurus
      - - Hypsilophodon
        - - Gasparinisaura
          - - - Parksosaurus
              - Thescelosaurus
            - - Rhabdodontidae
                - Rhabdodon
                - - Zalmoxes robustus
                  - Zalmoxes shqiperorum
              - Iguanodontia
                - Tenontosaurus spp.
                - Dryomorpha
                  - Dryosaurus
                  - Ankylopollexia
                    - Camptosaurus
                    - Iguanodon

Topology B: Preferred tree Fonseca et al. (2024)

- Cerapoda
  - Marginocephalia
  - - Hypsilophodontidae
    - Iguanodontia
      - Rhabdodontomorpha
        - Tenontosauridae
        - Rhabdodontoidea
          - Transylvanosaurus
          - - Rhabdodon septimanicus
            - - Mochlodon spp.
              - Rhabdodontidae
                - Rhabdodon priscus
                - - Matheronodon
                  - Zalmoxes robustus
                  - Zalmoxes shqiperorum
      - Euiguanodontia
        - - Elasmarians
          - - Iyuku
            - Dryomorpha

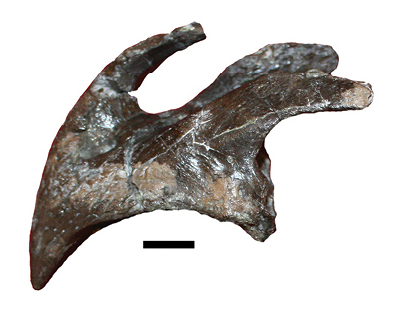
Holotype snout of the close relative Ajkaceratops

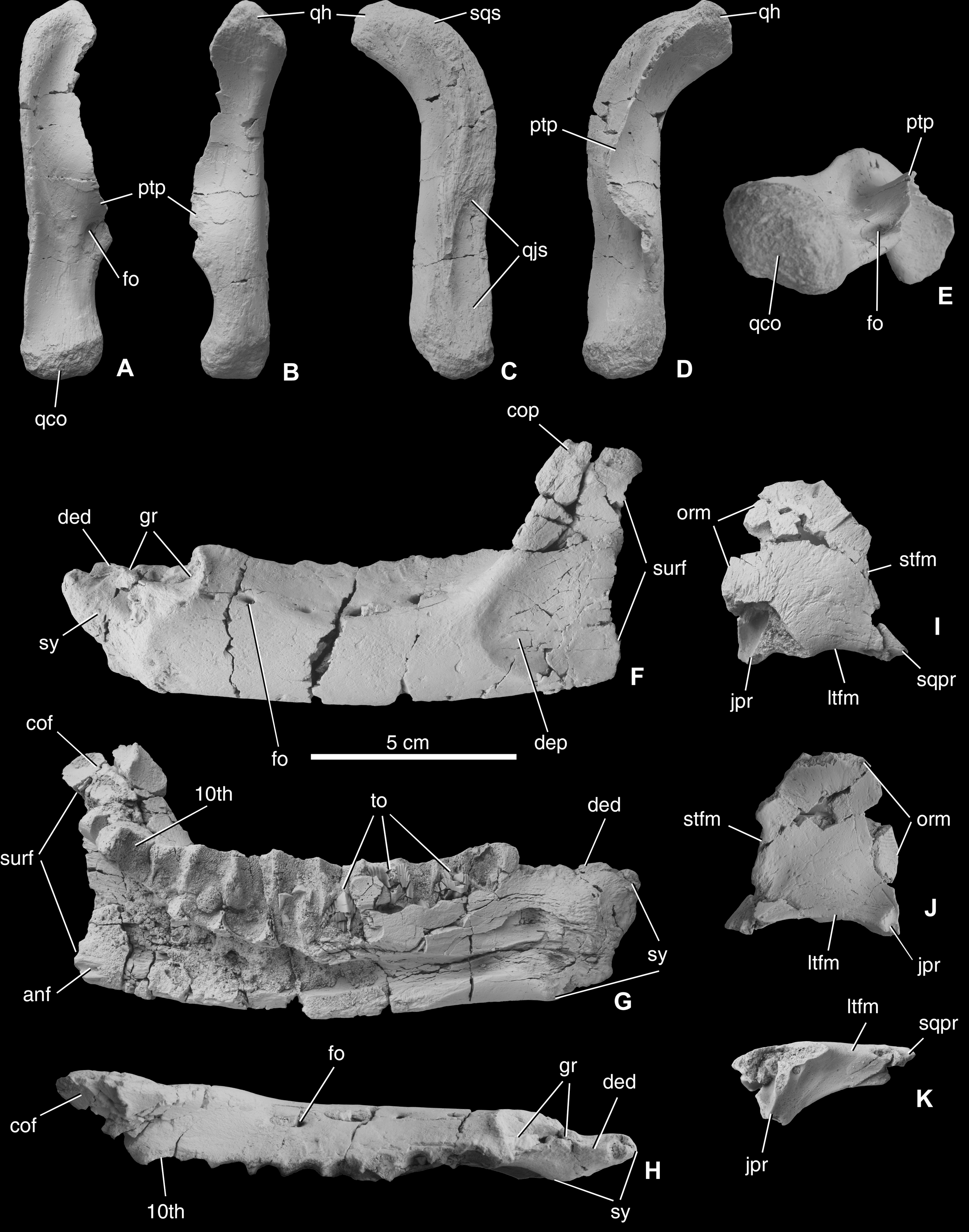
Skull bones of "Mochlodon" vorosi, proposed to be synonymous with Ajkaceratops

To test the phylogenetic relationships of Ajkaceratops and Ferenceratops in the context of newly-described remains, Maidment et al. (2026) used the phylogenetic dataset of Han et al. (2017), which was used to test the relationships of the early ceratopsian Yinlong. Their results confidently placed these genera within the Ceratopsia. The authors explained that the teeth, jaws, and limbs of iguanodontians and ceratopsians are highly convergent in many respects, due to their convergent complex chewing mechanisms, body size, and locomotion. As such, previous work was not suited to recognize the ceratopsian affinities of some 'rhabdodontids'. In their extended implied weighting analysis, the interrelationships of derived members of Ceratopsia were poorly resolved, but a distinction between marginocephalians and ornithopods was recovered, with early ornithopod relationships well-resolved. Using a Bayesian analysis, Ceratopsia was fully resolved, with Ajkaceratops, Ferenceratops, and Zalmoxes robustus forming a distinct clade as the sister taxon to one including Zuniceratops, Turanoceratops, and the more derived Ceratopsidae. This tree, however, recovered an unresolved polytomy at the base of Cerapoda, including Pachycephalosauria, Ceratopsia, and most included ornithopod taxa. The results of the Bayesian analysis are displayed in the cladogram below, focused on more derived ceratopsians.

- Neoceratopsia
  - Liaoceratops yanzigouensis
  - - Aquilops americanus
    - - Archaeoceratops oshimai
      - - Auroraceratops rugosus
        - - Yamaceratops dorngobiensis
          - - Leptoceratops gracilis
            - Mosaiceratops azumai
            - - Protoceratops andrewsi
              - - Bagaceratops rozhdestvenskyi
                - - - Ajkaceratops kozmai
                    - - Ferenceratops shqiperorum
                      - Zalmoxes robustus
                  - - Zuniceratops christopheri
                    - - Turanoceratops tardabilis
                      - Ceratopsidae

== Palaeoecology ==
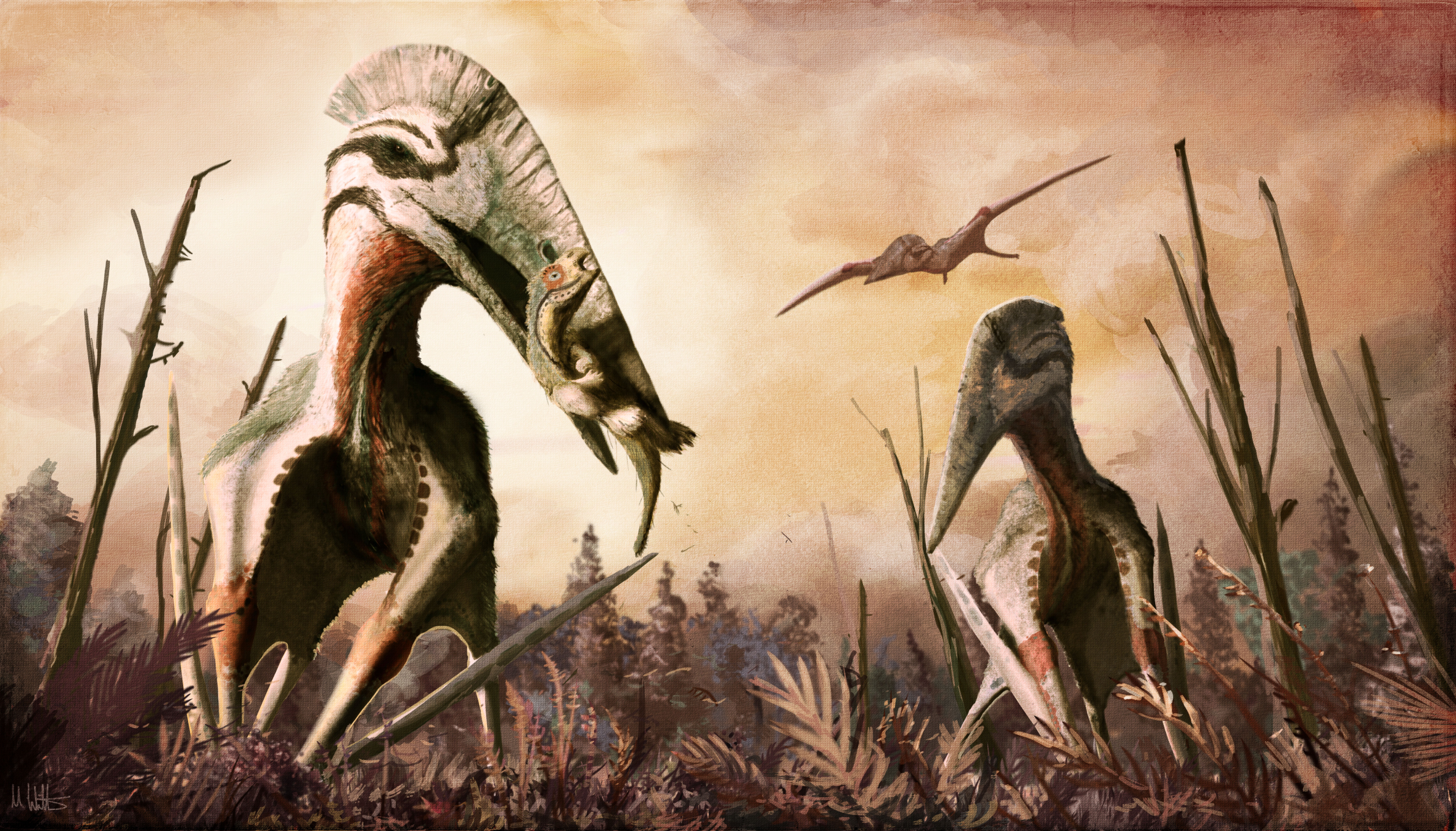
Paleoenvironmental reconstruction of the giant azhdarchid Hatzegopteryx preying on Zalmoxes (depicted as an ornithopod)

Ferenceratops is known from remains found in the Sânpetru and Densuș-Ciula formations of Romania, both of which preserve the Hațeg Island biota, which date to the Maastrichtian age of the late Cretaceous period. The climate of this paleoenvironment has been interpreted as subtropical, with palaeosols (ancient soil layers), flora types, and stable isotopes indicating fluctuating rainy and dry seasons. Carbon isotopes imply the conditions were consistent with a 'dry woodland'. A mean annual temperature between 20 and 25 °C (68 and 77 °F) is suggested by oxygen isotopes.

Both formations are characterized by titanosaurian sauropods (such as Magyarosaurus, Paludititan, Petrustitan, and Uriash) and feathered theropods (dromaeosaurids, troodontids, Balaur, and Elopteryx). Other dinosaurs from the Sânpetru Formation include the ankylosaur Struthiosaurus and the hadrosauromorph Telmatosaurus. Other animals of the fauna include the giant azhdarchid pterosaur Hatzegopteryx, various mesoeucrocodylians (Allodaposuchus, Acynodon, Doratodon, and Musturzabalsuchus), various snakes, lizards, and turtles, birds, multituberculate mammals, albanerpetontid and anuran (frogs) amphibians, and several fish.

== See also ==
- Ajkaceratops
- Timeline of ceratopsian research
- 2026 in archosaur paleontology
