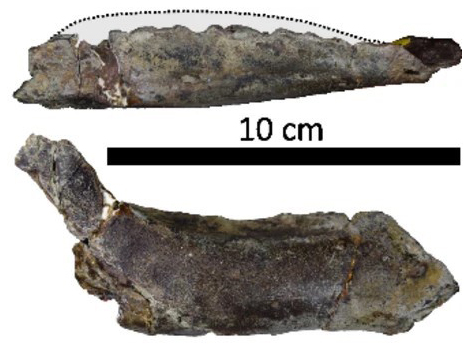
- Right holotype dentary of Z. robustus from above and the side

Scientific classification
- Kingdom: Animalia
- Phylum: Chordata
- Class: Reptilia
- Clade: Dinosauria
- Clade: †Ornithischia
- Clade: †Ornithopoda
- Family: †Rhabdodontidae
- Genus: †Zalmoxes; Weishampel et al. 2003
- Species: †Z. robustus

Binomial name
- †Zalmoxes robustus (Nopcsa, 1899)

Synonyms
- Mochlodon robustum Nopcsa, 1899; Onychosaurus hungaricus Nopcsa, 1902; Rhabdodon robustum (Nopcsa, 1915); Rhabdodon robustus (Nopcsa, 1915

= Zalmoxes =

Zalmoxes Temporal range: Maastrichtian 70–66 Ma

Extinct genus of dinosaurs

Zalmoxes is a genus of probable rhabdodontid ornithopod dinosaur from the Maastrichtian age of the Late Cretaceous in what is now Romania. The genus is known from specimens first named as the species Mochlodon robustum in 1899 by Franz Nopcsa before being reclassified as Rhabdodon robustum by him in 1915. In 1990, this name was corrected to Rhabdodon robustus by George Olshevsky and, in 2003, the species was once more reclassified as the type species Zalmoxes robustus. Zalmoxes represents one of the most common vertebrates of Transylvania during the latest Cretaceous period. The generic name refers to the Dacian deity Zalmoxis and the specific name robustus refers to the robustness of the remains. Another species, Zalmoxes shqiperorum, was named in 2003, but this species has since been reassigned to a separate genus of ceratopsian, Ferenceratops.

== History of discovery ==
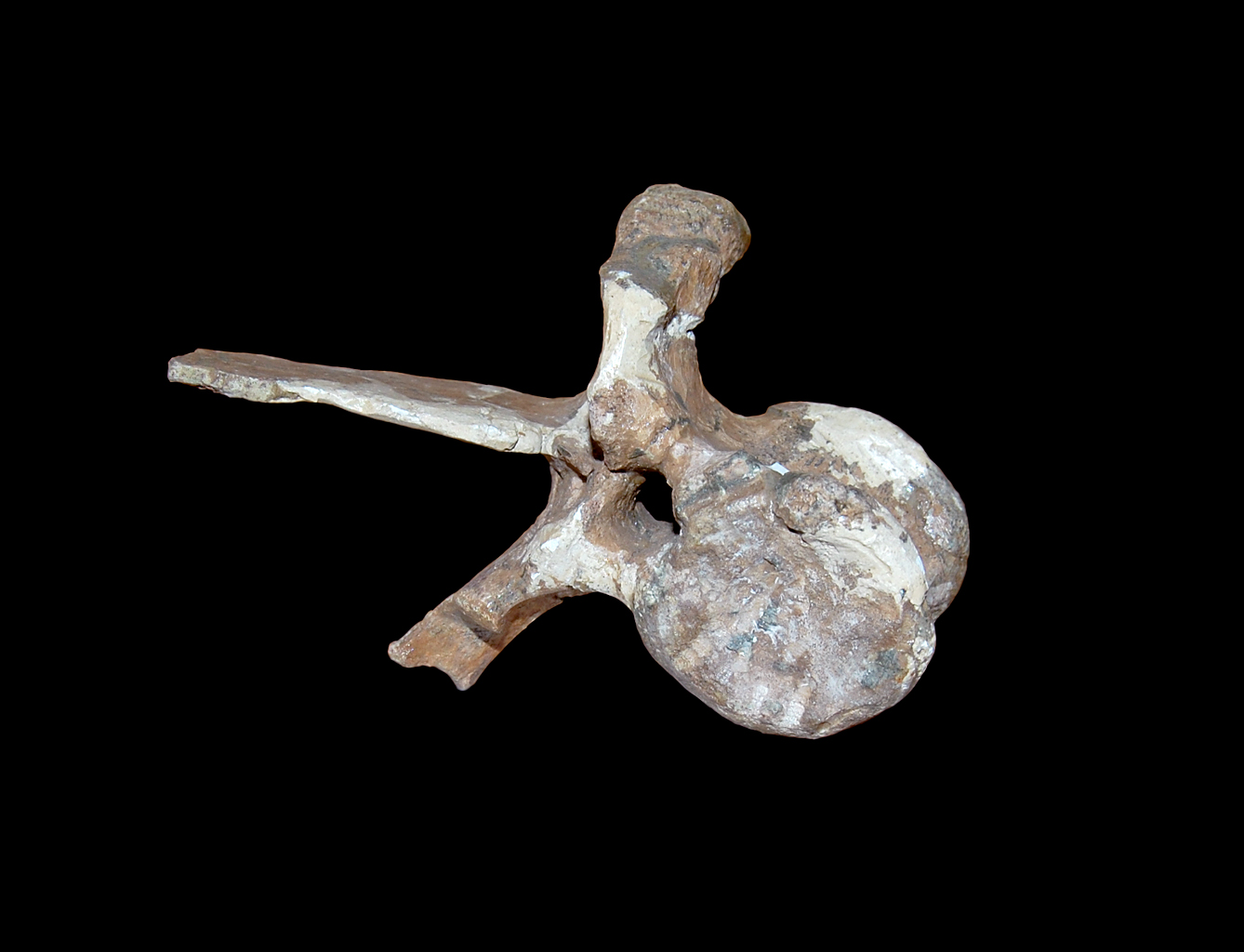
Caudal vertebra, Deva Natural History Museum

Zalmoxes was first known from numerous fossils found in Transylvania, which were named as the species Mochlodon robustus by Baron Franz Nopcsa in 1899. The specific name referred to its robust build. In 1915, Nopcsa renamed the species to Rhabdodon robustum, amended in 2003 by David B. Weishampel, Coralia-Maria Jianu, Zoltan Csiki, and David B. Norman. Weishampel et al. (2003) published a paper on new remains from Romania, which they found to represent a new species. They found R. robustus was sufficiently different from Rhabdodon and named the new genus Zalmoxes for the former. The genus refers to the Thracian deity Zalmoxis (sometimes spelled Zalmoxes), who retreated for three years in a crypt to be resurrected on the fourth year. Likewise, the animal Zalmoxes had been liberated from its fossil grave to attain taxonomic immortality. The naming article further explained this by referring to Zalmoxes, a ruler viewed as a deity by the Getae, a Thracian Tribe, according to Herodotus. Weishampel et al. also named new specimens as Zalmoxes shqiperorum, after Shqiperia, the Albanian name for Albania, with which Nopcsa had a special relationship. In 2026, this species was determined to be a ceratopsian dinosaur as opposed to an ornithopod, and given the new generic name Ferenceratops.

One specimen is now assigned to Telmatosaurus, while another specimen is also suspected to belong to that genus based on similar basicrania morphology.

== Description ==
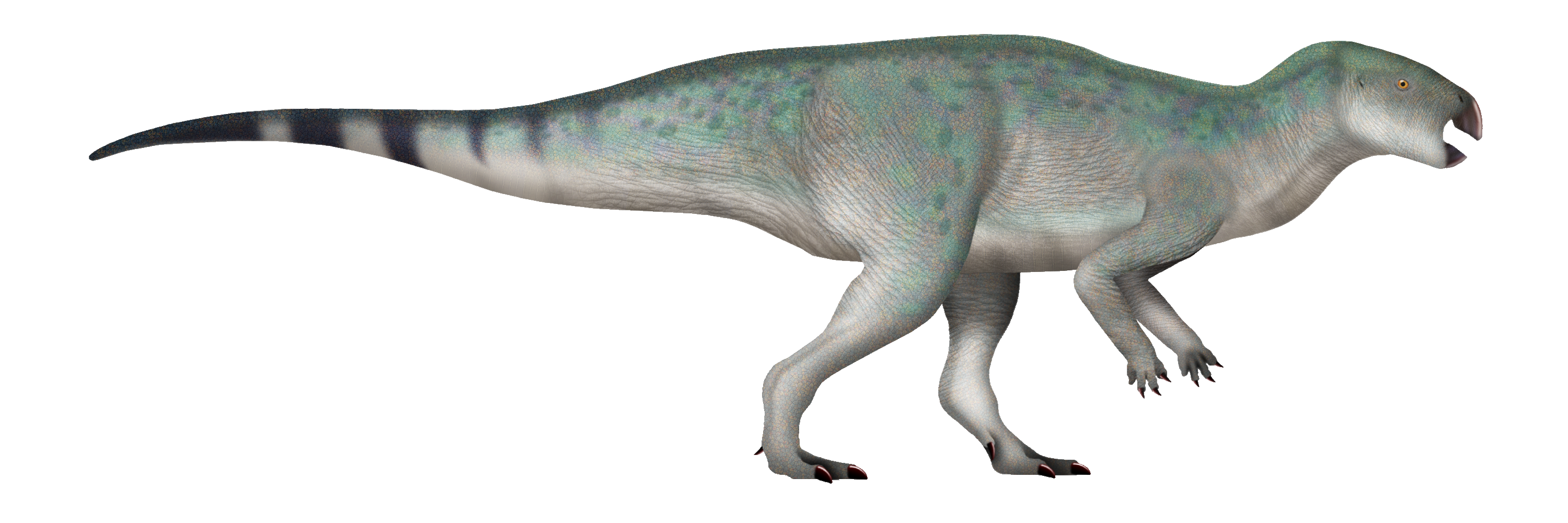
Life restoration

Zalmoxes is a rather small genus of bipedal herbivore with a large triangular head and a beak. The subadult Z. robustus range from 2–2.4 m (6.6–7.9 ft) in total body length. An adult Z. robustus would have measured up to 2.5 m (8.2 ft) in length and 45 kg (99 lb) in body mass. An unnamed species of Zalmoxes, is known from larger sizes, with an adult 2.9 m (9.5 ft) in length. Although Nopcsa thought the small size of Zalmoxes was due to island dwarfism, Attila Ösi and colleagues found it was closer to the size of the rhabdodontid ancestor, with larger Rhabdodon and smaller Mochlodon having island gigantism and island dwarfism respectively. However, when the species of Zalmoxes are taken into account separately, it can be seen than Z. shqiperorum continued the general size trend from Orodromeus to Tenontosaurus, while Z. robustus may have had slight nanism. Zalmoxes had a relatively slow growth rate and long growth period, suggesting that this dinosaur may have had a unique growth strategy.

Zalmoxes robustus (purple) compared in size to a human and other iguanodonts

Z. robustus is known from about 80% of the skull. However, no complete articulated skull is known, and most of the bones do not overlap and are found in isolation. Weishampel et al. found that these likely represented one individual, as the bones were from the same formation and are the same colour. Four individuals were identified by Nopcsa for Z. robustus, and from these it can be seen that there is skeletal variation in the species. Like with the cranial material, vertebrae of Z. robustus are often found isolated. All regions of the vertebral column are represented in the fossil record, although no sternal plates have been found yet. The sacrum includes three vertebrae, with two sacrodorsals (dorsal vertebrae in the sacrum) and three sacrocaudals (caudal vertebrae in the sacrum). The limb and girdle bones are also well represented, with only the hands (manus) and feet (pes) mostly lacking.

While more poorly known than Z. robustus, Z. shqiperorum is still known from a relatively large amount of the skeleton. Only two mostly complete skeletons are known, the holotype adult, and a referred juvenile. The lower jaw (dentary) of Z. shqiperorum is relatively shorter than the equivalent in Z. robustus, although it is much larger. Ossified tendons are known from the juvenile specimen, showing that they were circular or elliptical in cross section and have fine striations in Z. shqiperorum. Cervical, dorsal and caudal vertebrae are known from Z. shqiperorum, although the former two are only represented by juvenile material. A complete articulated sacrum is known for Z. shqiperorum, with three vertebrae and at least two sacrodorsals. No manual material is known from the species, although a metatarsal and a few phalanges are known.

== Classification ==
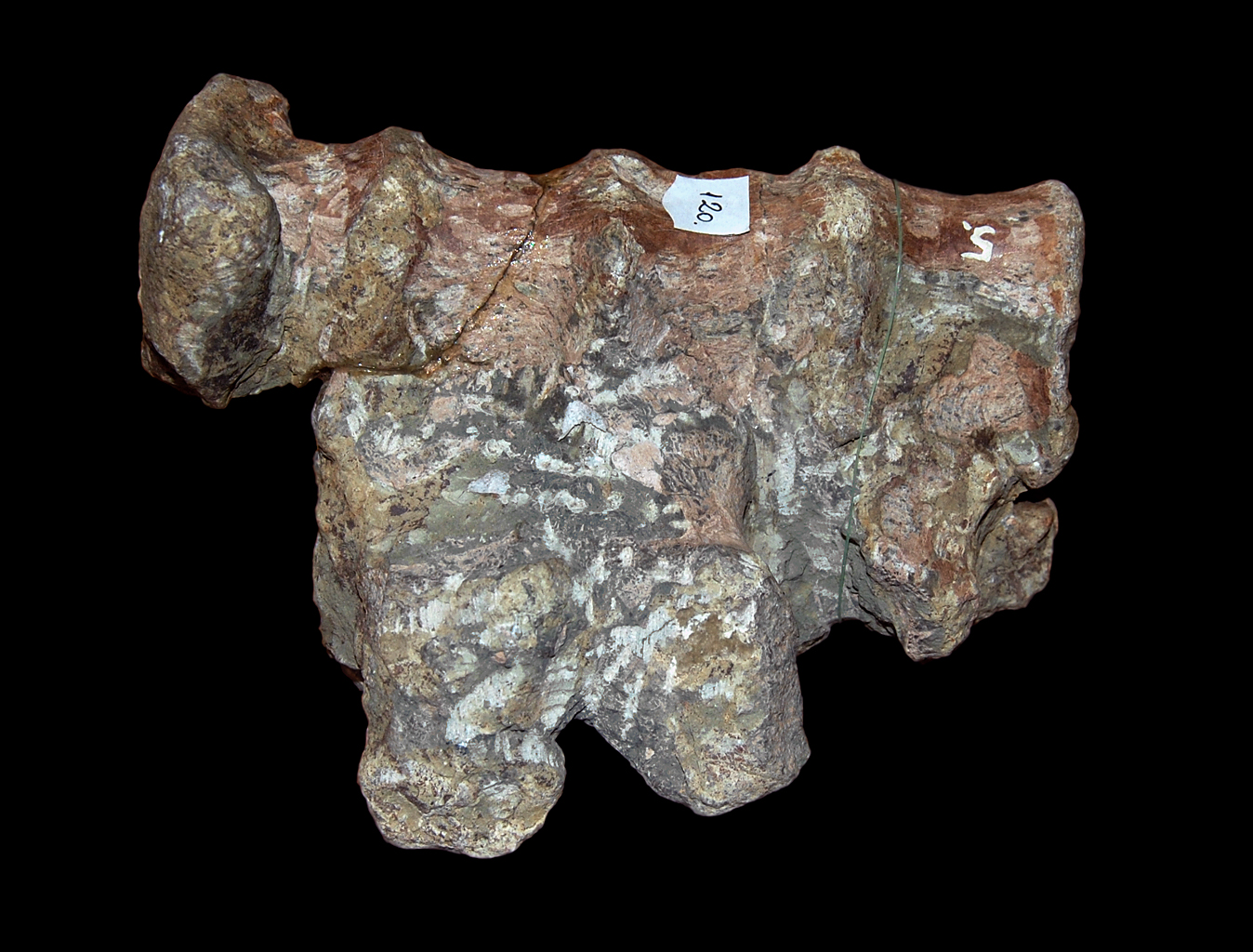
Articulated sacrum of Zalmoxes

The species of Mochlodon, Rhabdodon and Zalmoxes had long had an uncertain phylogenetic placement, being referred to various families. Nopcsa (1901) also had referred the genus to Hypsilophodontidae, and he suggested affinities with Camptosaurus in 1902, 1904 and 1915. Nopcsa (1915) also realized that Rhabdodon and Mochlodon may be congeneric, placing the complex in Camptosauridae.

For the next half-century, taxonomic workers found Rhabdodon and Mochlodon within either Camptosauridae or Iguanodontidae. However, Paul Sereno (1986) found that Rhabdodon and Mochlodon were within Iguanodontia. The ICZN (1988) resolved this complication, selecting the ornithopod Rhabdodon as having priority over Mochlodon. From this publication, scientists began placing Rhabdodon and Mochlodon within Euornithopoda. In 2003, Weishampel et al. named a new family for Mochlodon, Rhabdodon and the new genus Zalmoxes. This family, Rhabdodontidae, was placed as a derived within Iguanodontia. Further studies support this placement of Rhabdodontidae, phylogenetically between Talenkauen and Tenontosaurus.

Below are two possible phylogenies of Rhabdodontidae by McDonald et al. (2010; left), and Ösi et al. (2012; right).

- Ornithopoda
  - Hypsilophodon
  - Iguanodontia
    - Rhabdodontidae
      - Muttaburrasaurus
      - Rhabdodon
      - - Mochlodon
        - Zalmoxes
    - - Tenontosaurus
      - Dryomorpha

- Ornithopoda
  - Hypsilophodon
  - - Thescelosaurus
    - Iguanodontia
      - Talenkauen
      - - - Dryomorpha
          - Tenontosaurus
        - Rhabdodontidae
          - Rhabdodon
          - - Mochlodon
            - Zalmoxes

In their phylogenetic analyses of Ajkaceratops and Ferenceratops, Maidment et al. (2026) used the phylogenetic dataset of Han et al. (2017), which was used to test the relationships of the early ceratopsian Yinlong. Their results confidently placed these two genera within the Ceratopsia. In some versions of their phylogenetic analyses, Zalmoxes robustus was retained as an ornithopod, including the extended implied weighting analysis, which recovered a poorly-resolved Ceratopsia but better resolution for early-diverging lineages and ornithopods. Using a Bayesian analysis, Ceratopsia was better resolved, with Zalmoxes robustus forming a distinct clade with Ajkaceratops and Ferenceratops, specifically as the sister taxon to one including Zuniceratops, Turanoceratops, and the more derived Ceratopsidae. This tree, however, recovered an unresolved polytomy at the base of Cerapoda including Pachycephalosauria, Ceratopsia, and most included ornithopod taxa. The results of the Bayesian analysis are displayed in the cladogram below, focused on more derived ceratopsians.

- Neoceratopsia
  - Liaoceratops yanzigouensis
  - - Aquilops americanus
    - - Archaeoceratops oshimai
      - - Auroraceratops rugosus
        - - Yamaceratops dorngobiensis
          - - Leptoceratops gracilis
            - Mosaiceratops azumai
            - - Protoceratops andrewsi
              - - Bagaceratops rozhdestvenskyi
                - - - Ajkaceratops kozmai
                    - - Ferenceratops shqiperorum
                      - Zalmoxes robustus
                  - - Zuniceratops christopheri
                    - - Turanoceratops tardabilis
                      - Ceratopsidae

== Paleobiology ==
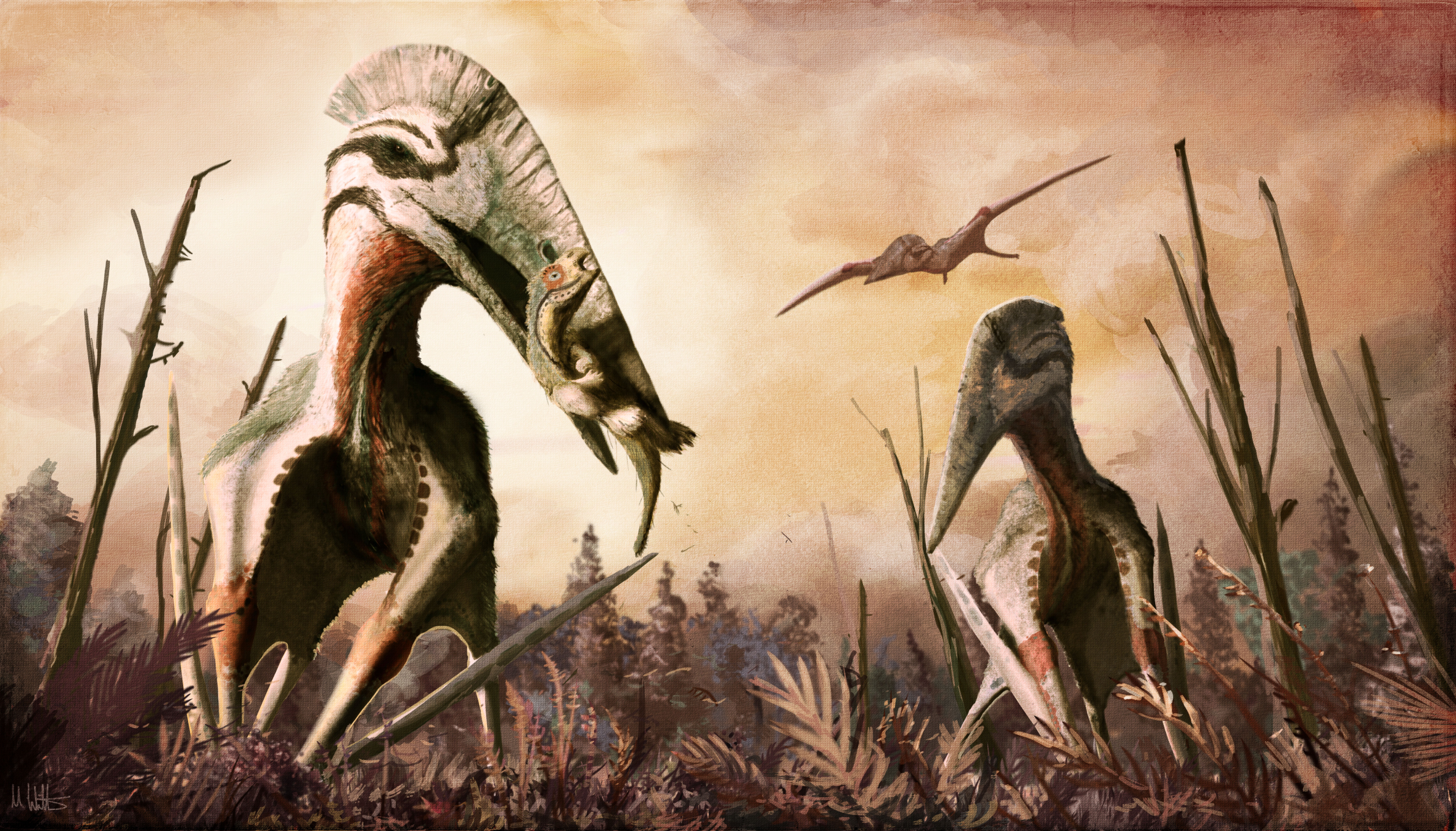
Restoration of the pterosaur Hatzegopteryx preying on Zalmoxes

Zalmoxes has a more robust build than its precursors and more derived relatives. Infraspecific ontogenetic growth is relatively well known in Zalmoxes as there is juvenile material known for the species. Nopcsa proposed that the animals of the Hateg Basin, which were smaller than their relatives elsewhere, adapted through insular dwarfism. Fossils of Zalmoxes have been unearthed in the Sânpetru Formation, the Sebes Formation and Densuş-Ciula Formation in Romania, all of which are in the Hateg Island region.

=== Diet ===
A scientific paper from 2003 found that Zalmoxes most likely had a diet that consisted of tough fibrous plants like soft shoots, horsetails, angiosperms, pteridophytes, and ferns. Further studies showed that it could process and digest C3 plants.
