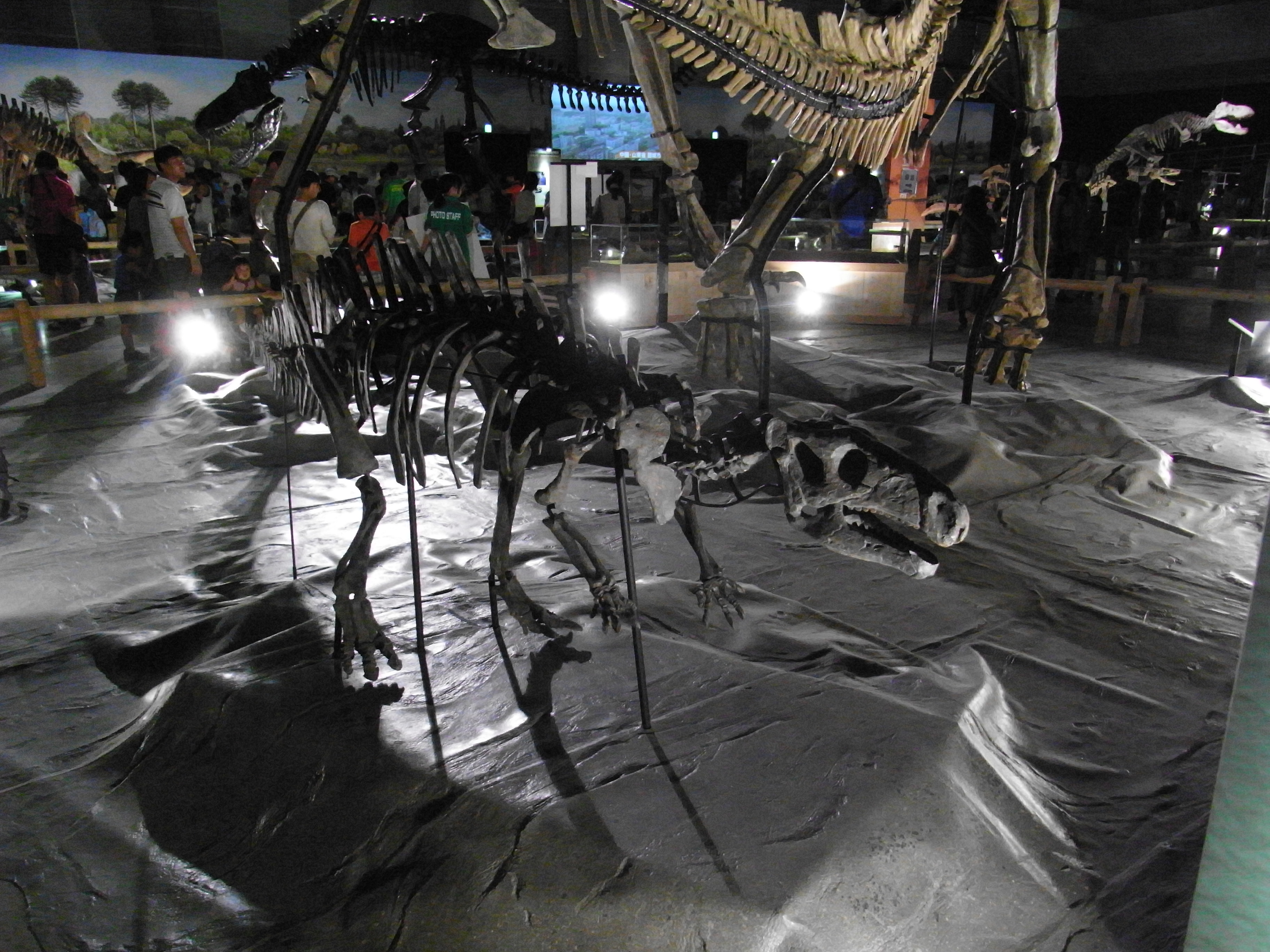
- Reconstructed skeleton in Japan

Scientific classification
- Kingdom: Animalia
- Phylum: Chordata
- Class: Reptilia
- Clade: Dinosauria
- Clade: †Ornithischia
- Clade: †Ornithopoda
- Family: †Rhabdodontidae
- Genus: †Rhabdodon; Matheron, 1869
- Species: †R. priscus

Binomial name
- †Rhabdodon priscus Matheron, 1869

= Rhabdodon =

Rhabdodon Temporal range: Late Cretaceous (Maastrichtian), ~72–66 Ma

Genus of ornithopod dinosaurs

Rhabdodon (meaning "fluted tooth") is a genus of ornithopod dinosaur that lived in Europe approximately 72-66 million years ago in the Late Cretaceous. The genus contains a single species, R. priscus. It is similar in build to a very robust "hypsilophodont" (non-iguanodont ornithopod), though all modern phylogenetic analyses find this to be an unnatural grouping, and Rhabdodon to be a basal member of Iguanodontia. It was large amongst its relatives, measuring 4 m (13 ft) long and weighing 250 kg (550 lb), with some specimens possibly reaching up to 6 m (20 ft) long.

== Discovery and naming ==
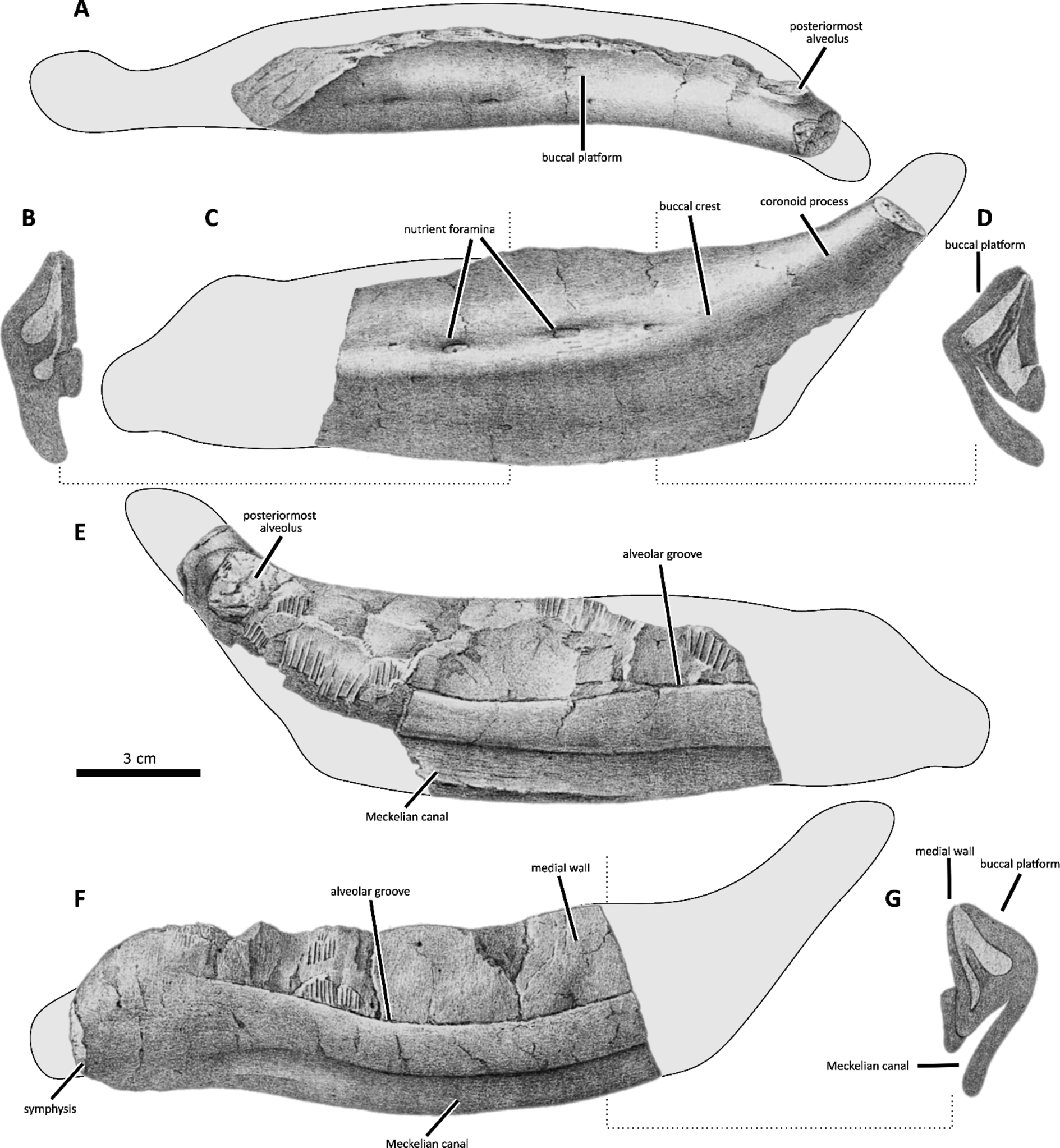
Lectotype and paralectotype dentaries

Rhabdodon is known from southern France, although fragmentary remains from eastern Spain have been assigned to the genus. Rhabdodon was large compared to its nearest relatives, and indeed one recent paper (Ősi et al., 2012) determined it is larger than the basal rhabdodontid status; from this they suggested that it actually experienced gigantism on the "mainland" and not insular dwarfism as previous suggested.

The type species was originally named under two spellings by Matheron (1869), Rhabdodon priscum and Rabdodon priscum. While later authors adopted Rhabdodon as the correct spelling, this genus name was originally established for a snake in a thesis by Fleischmann (1831), which led to some researchers abandoning the name in favor of Mochlodon. In 1986, the Swiss paleontologist Winand Brinkmann submitted an application for the International Code of Zoological Nomenclature (ICZN) to suppress this previous use by Fleischmann (1831) and to amend the specific name to priscus. The approval of this petition by the ICZN in 1988 conserved and formalized the binomen Rhabdodon priscus for the type species.

In 1991, the French paleontologists Eric Buffetaut and Jean Le Loueff named the second species R. septimanicus from the Argiles et Grès à Reptiles Formation. In 2025, the Polish paleontologists Łukasz Czepiński and Daniel Madzia reassigned this species to its own genus, Obelignathus.

== Classification ==
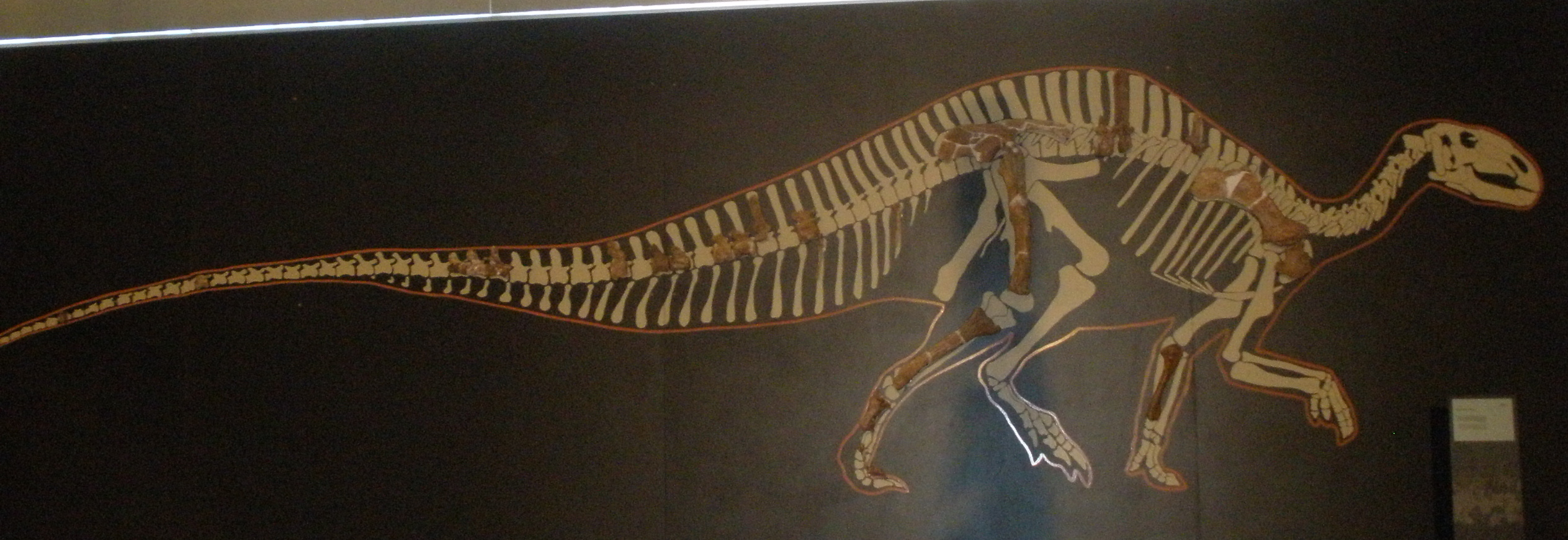
Wall-mounted fossils of Rhabdodon superimposed on the skeleton and silhouette of Tenontosaurus

The cladogram below is based on the analysis of Ösi et al. (2012):

- Ornithopoda
  - Hypsilophodon
  - - Thescelosaurus
    - Iguanodontia
      - Talenkauen
      - - - Dryomorpha
          - Tenontosaurus
        - Rhabdodontidae
          - Rhabdodon
          - - Mochlodon
            - Zalmoxes

Maidment et al. (2026), on the other hand, recovered multiple specimens usually found to be rhabdodontids to be instead members of Ceratopsoidea. While their analysis did not cover the Rhabdodon type specimens, material labeled as cf.Rhabdodon was part of the study and was found to belong to early diverging iguanodontians, the common placement for rhabdodontids.

== Paleobiology ==
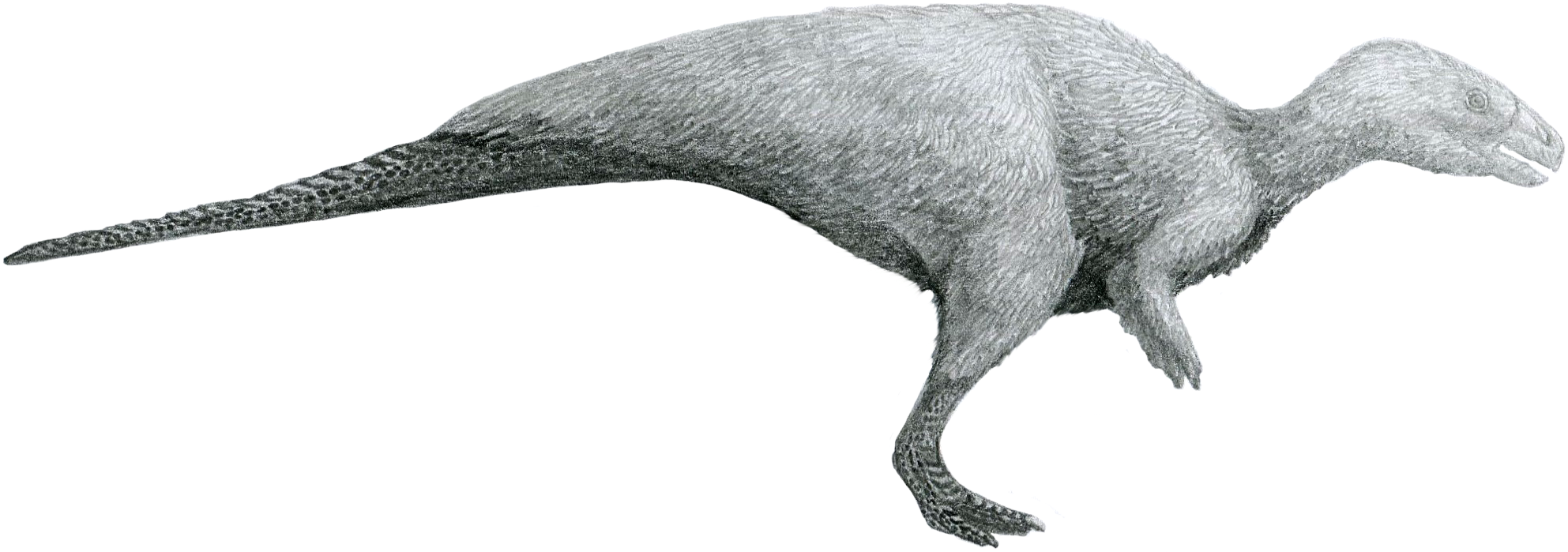
Speculative life reconstruction

Rhabdodon was probably an herbivore in Cretaceous Europe. Carnivorous dinosaurs in the ecosystem included the abelisaurid Arcovenator and the paravian Pyroraptor. Isotope analysis shows that Rhabdodon, along with its smaller cousin Zalmoxes, ate C3 plants.

== Palaeoenvironment ==
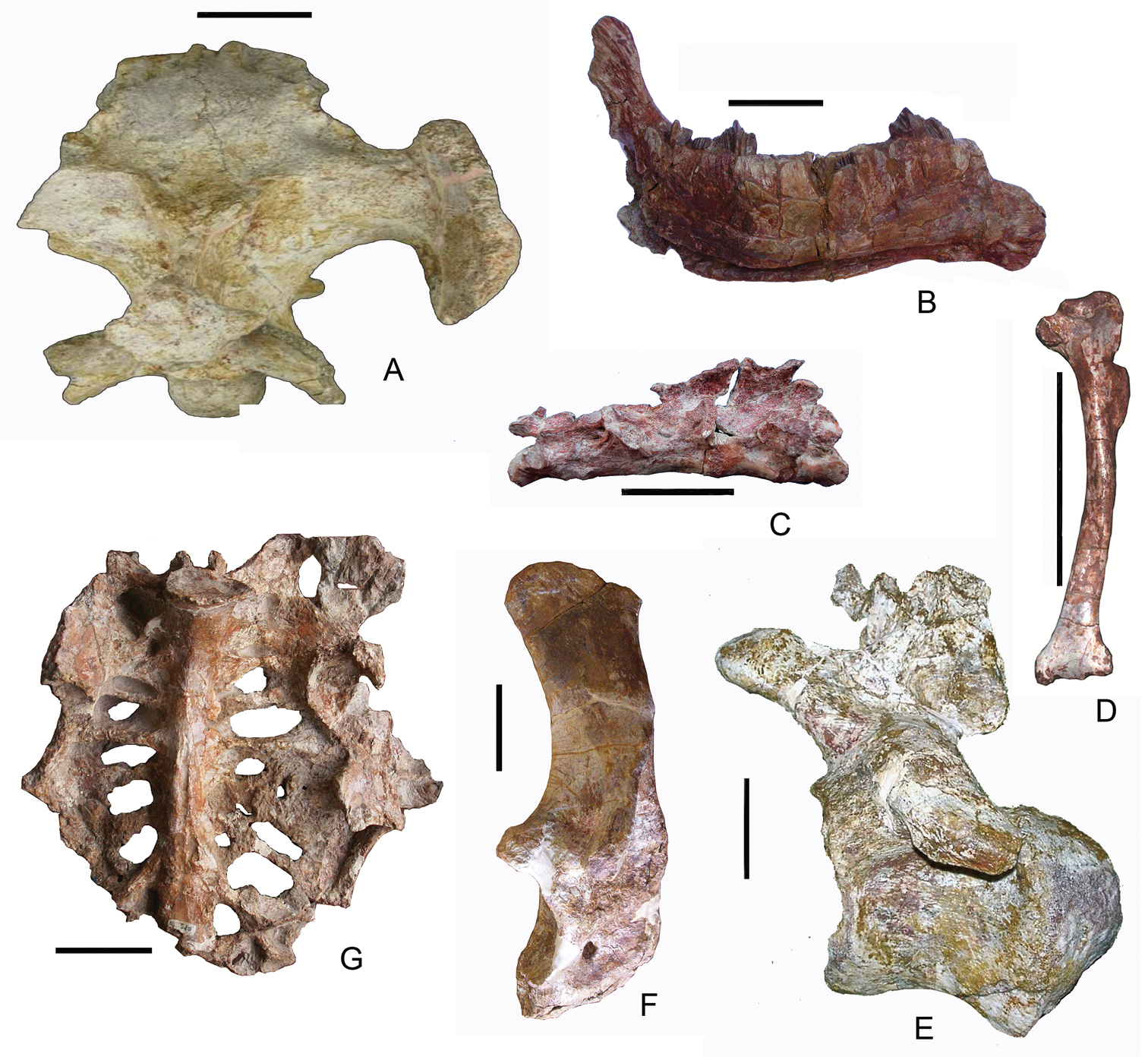
Representative taxa from the late Campanian–early Maastrichtian faunas from southern France, including a Rhabdodon dentary (B)

Rhabdodon is known from a specimen from the Marnes Rouges Inférieures Formation. The known material includes a dentary and many other postcranial remains. More specifically, it is known from the Bellevue layer, which has produced many vertebrate fossils. Even though it produced many vertebrates, the formation only has a scarce record of plants and invertebrates. The non-dinosaurian vertebrates consist of Lepisosteus, an indeterminate turtle, and a crocodile. Dinosaurian fauna from the Marnes Rouges Inférieures Formation include Ampelosaurus, an animal classified as Dromaeosauridae indet., and an indeterminate ankylosaur. The bird Gargantuavis philoinos, and dinosaur eggs have also been recovered.

Another formation Rhabdodon is known from is Gres de Saint-Chinian. This formation also contains fossils of dinosaur eggs, Nodosauridae indet. (previously known as Rhodanosaurus lugdunensis), Theropoda indet., Variraptor mechinorum, Avialae indet., Enantiornithes indet., and a possible Abelisauridae indet. are known from this formation. Rhabdodon is also one of few vertebrates known from the Gres de Labarre Formation, with the only other fossils from the formation belong to Ampelosaurus atacis and a Nodosauridae indet.

=== Villalba de la Sierra Formation ===
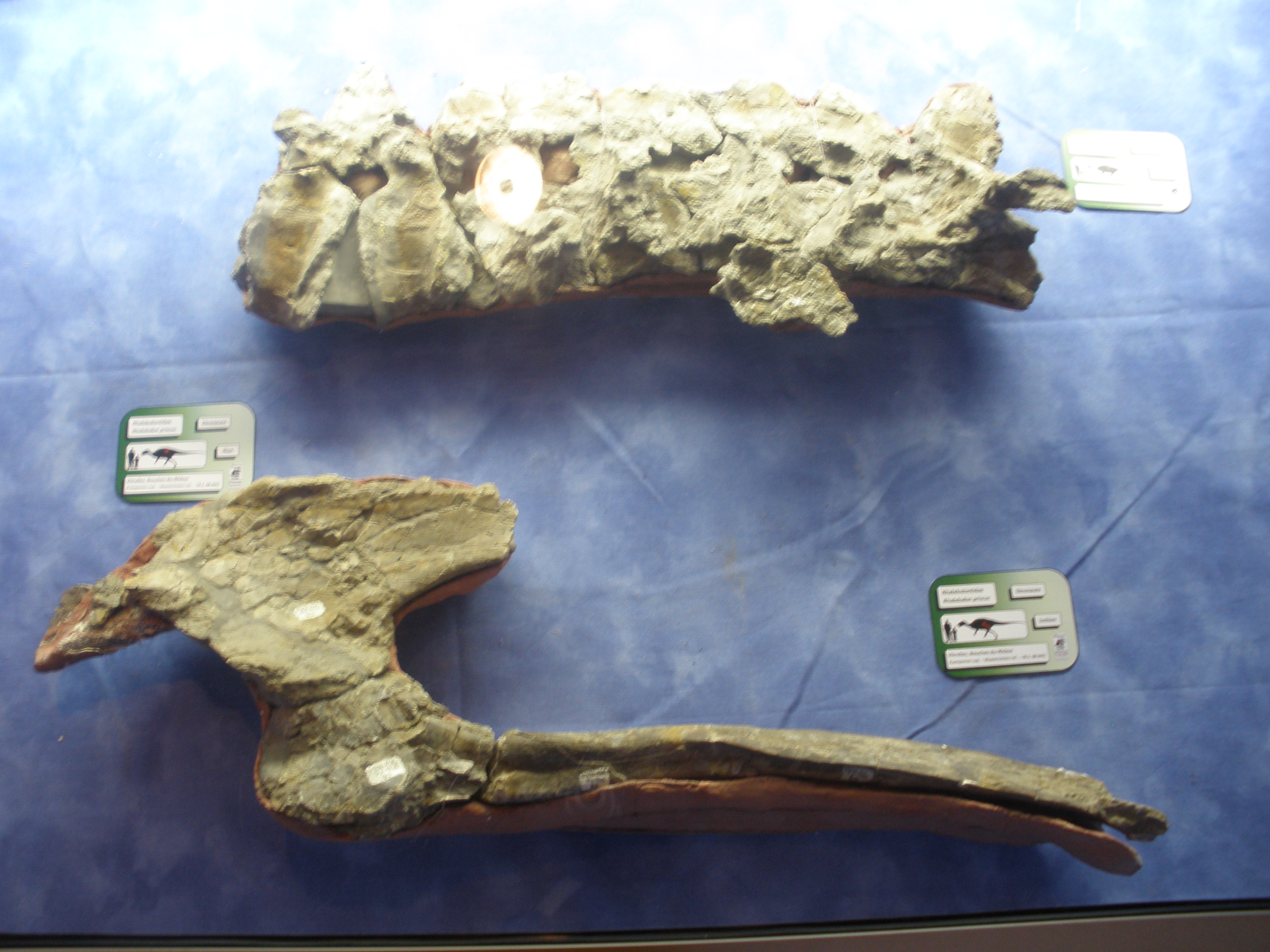
Pelvis and vertebrae in Museum d'Histoire Naturelle Aix-en-Provence

Rhabdodon sp. is from the latest Cretaceous aged Lo Hueco region in the Villalba de la Sierra Formation. A study shows that the area around Lo Hueco dates to the late Campanian and early Maastrichtian, although a more recent study revised the later date to the latest Maastrichtian. The study showed that Lo Hueco was near the coast of the Tethys Sea, a large seaway through southern Europe and northern Africa. The area directly on the coast was shown to be a brackish-freshwater aquatic environment, with a muddy flood-plain beside it. Lo Hueco was found to be inside the flood-plain. The flood plain was found to have distributary channels of sand and terrigenous material.

Many dinosaurs have been found in the Villalba de la Sierra Formation, including Rhabdodon sp. They consist of possible Lirainosaurus remains, Ampelosaurus atacis, unknown basal euornithopods, probable ankylosaurians, one undetermined dromaeosaurine, and one unknown velociraptorine. The plants known from the formation are represented by carbonized branches and leaves. Invertebrates are solely known from bivalves and gastropods. Fishes from the formation include lepisosteids, and unidentified actinopterygians and teleosteans. Turtle fossils are very common, but only two different groups have been identified, the bothremydids Polysternon and Rosasia, along with an undetermined Pancryptodiran. Squamate lizards are known only from a few undetermined specimens, and eusuchian crocodiles are known from a specimen with similarities to Allodaposuchus and Musturzabalsuchus.
