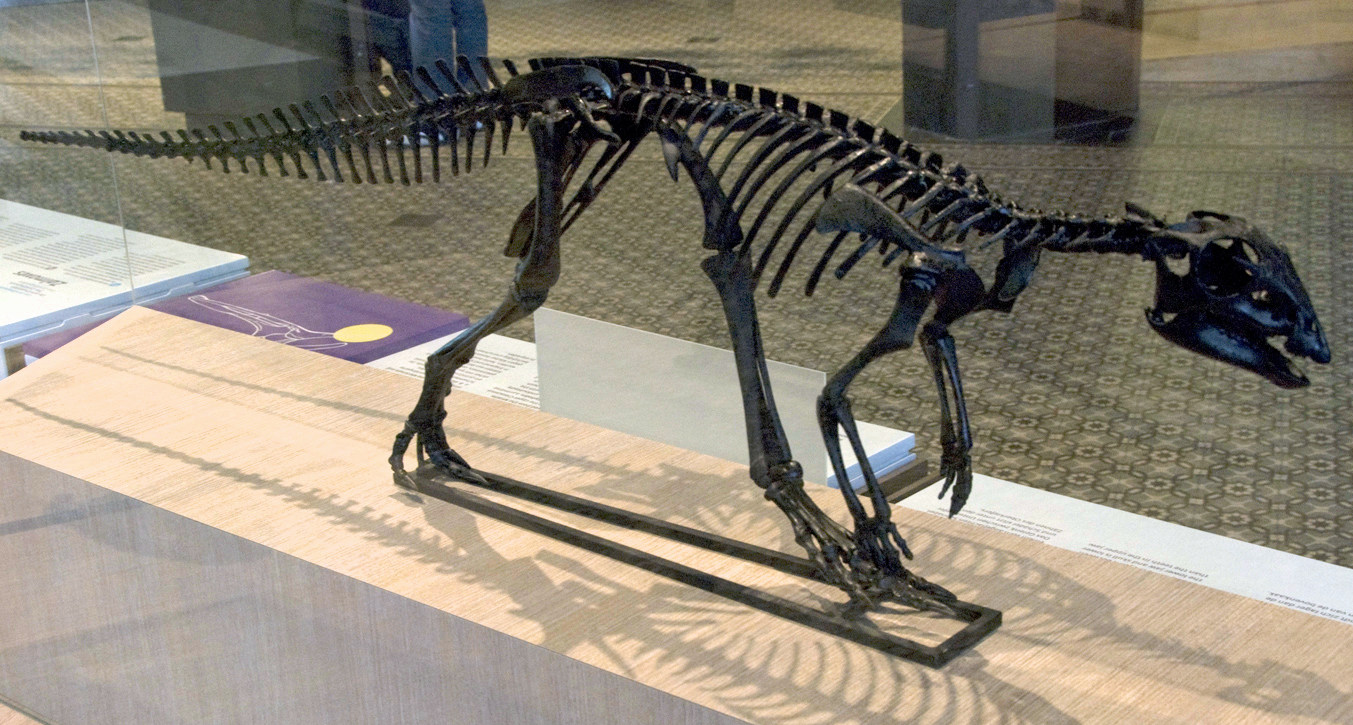
- Replica at Brussels Science Institute

Scientific classification
- Kingdom: Animalia
- Phylum: Chordata
- Class: Reptilia
- Clade: Dinosauria
- Clade: †Ornithischia
- Family: †Hypsilophodontidae
- Genus: †Hypsilophodon; Huxley, 1869
- Species: †H. foxii

Binomial name
- †Hypsilophodon foxii Huxley, 1869

= Hypsilophodon =

Hypsilophodon Temporal range: Early Cretaceous, 130–125 Ma

Extinct genus of dinosaurs

Hypsilophodon (/ˌhɪpsɪˈlɒfoʊdɒn/; meaning "Hypsilophus-tooth") is a neornithischian dinosaur genus from the Early Cretaceous period of England. It has traditionally been considered an early member of the group Ornithopoda, but recent research has put this into question.

The first remains of Hypsilophodon were found in 1849; the type species, Hypsilophodon foxii, was named in 1869. Abundant fossil discoveries were made on the Isle of Wight, giving a good impression of the build of the species. It was a small, agile bipedal herbivore, measuring 1.5–2 m (4.9–6.6 ft) long and weighing 20 kg (44 lb). It had a pointed head equipped with a sharp beak used to bite off plant material, much like modern-day parrots.

Some outdated studies have given rise to a number of misconceptions about Hypsilophodon, including that it was an armoured, arboreal animal, and that it could be found in areas outside of the Isle of Wight. However, research from the following years has shown these ideas to be incorrect.

== Discovery and history ==
=== First specimens and the debate of distinctiveness ===
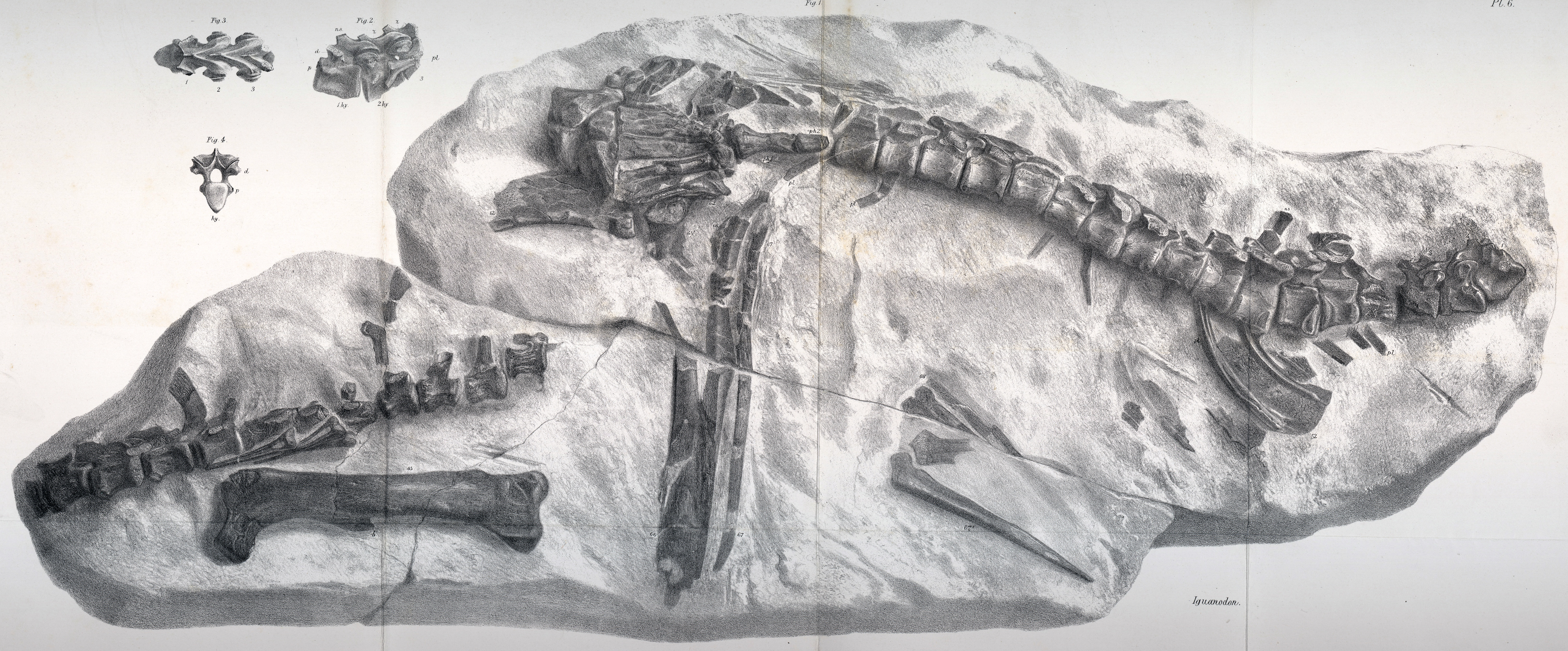
Illustration of the complete Mantell-Bowerbank block. Mantell had received the bottom half, and Bowerbank the top.

The first specimen of Hypsilophodon was recovered in 1849, when workers dug up the soon-called Mantell-Bowerbank block from an outcrop of the Wessex Formation, part of the Wealden Group, about one hundred yards west of Cowleaze Chine, on the south-west coast of Isle of Wight. The larger half of the block (including seventeen vertebrae, parts of ribs and a coracoid, some of the pelvis, and assorted hindleg remains) was given to naturalist James Scott Bowerbank, and the remainder (including eleven caudal vertebrae and most of the rest of hindlegs) to Gideon Mantell. After his death, Mantell's portion was acquired by the British Museum; Bowerbank's was acquired later, bringing both halves back together. Richard Owen studied both halves and, in 1855, published a short article on the specimen, considering it to be a young Iguanodon rather than a new taxon. This was unquestioned until 1867, when Thomas Henry Huxley compared the vertebrae and metatarsals of the specimen more closely to those of known Iguanodon, and concluded that it must be a different animal entirely. The next year, he saw a fossil skull discovered by William Fox on exhibition at the Norwich Meeting of the British Associations. Fox, who had also found his fossil in the Cowleaze Chine area, along with several other specimens, considered it to belong to a juvenile Iguanodon, or to represent a new, small species in the genus. Huxley noticed its unique dentition and edentulous premaxilla, reminiscent of but obviously distinct from that of Iguanodon. He concluded this specimen, too, represented a distinct animal from Iguanodon. After losing track of the specimen for some months, Huxley requested Fox grant him permission to study the specimen to a more extensive degree. The request was granted, and Huxley began work on his new species.

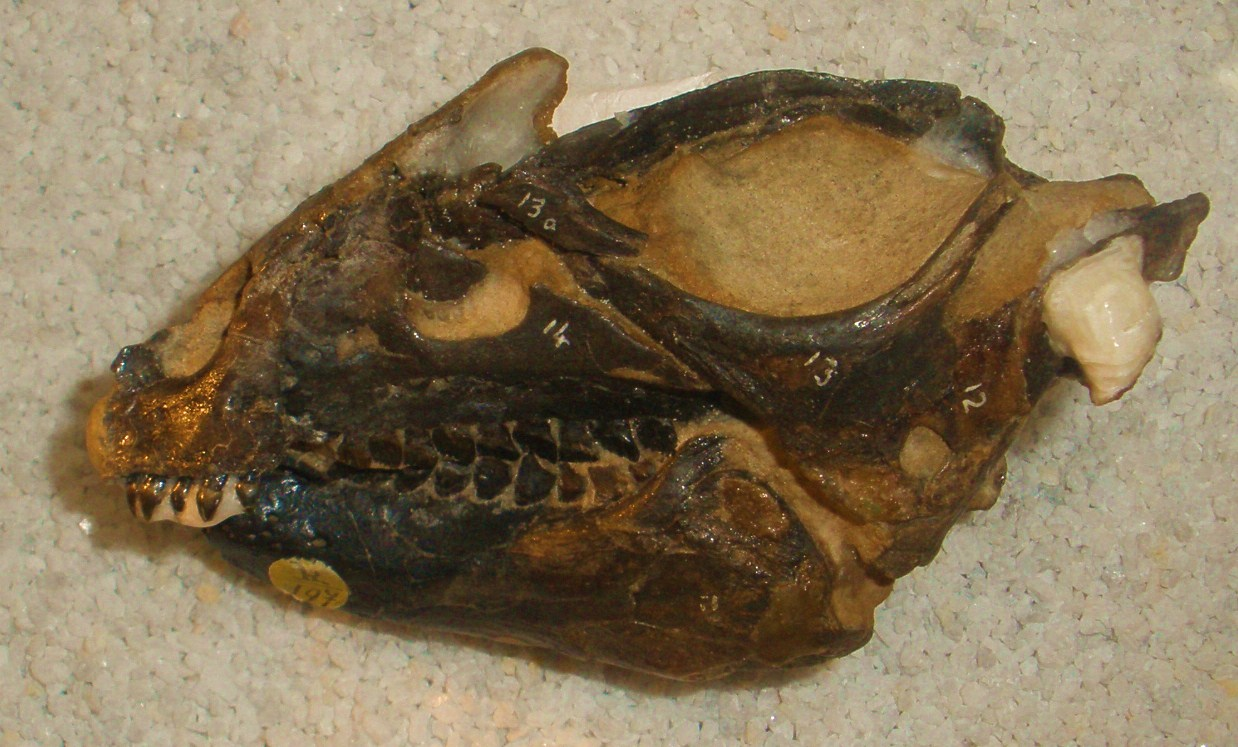
Fox's skull, the holotype NHMUK PV R 197

Huxley first announced the new species in 1869 in a lecture; the text of this, published the same year, forms the official naming article, because it contained a sufficient description. The species was named Hypsilophodon foxii, and the holotype was the Fox skull (which today has the inventory number NHM NHMUK PV R 197). The next year, Huxley published the expanded full description article. Within the same block of stone as the Fox skull, the centrum of a dorsal vertebra had been preserved. This allowed comparison with the Mantell-Bowerbank block, confirming it to belong to the same species. Further supporting this, Fox had confirmed that the block was found in the same geological bed as his material. As such, Huxley described this specimen in addition to the skull and centrum. It would become the paratype; its two pieces are now registered in the Natural History Museum as specimen NHMUK PV OR 28707, NHMUK PV OR 39560–1. Later in the same year, Huxley classified Hypsilophodon taxonomically, considering it to belong to the family Iguanodontidae, related to Iguanodon and Hadrosaurus. There would later be a persistent misunderstanding as to the meaning of the generic name, which is often translated directly from the Greek as "high-ridged tooth". In reality Huxley, analogous to the way the name of the related genus Iguanodon ("iguana-tooth") had been formed, intended to name the animal after an extant herbivorous lizard, choosing for this role Hypsilophus and combining its name with Greek ὀδών, odon, "tooth". Hypsilophodon thus means "Hypsilophus-tooth". The Greek ὑψίλοφος, hypsilophos, means "high-crested" and refers to the back frill of the lizard, not to the teeth of Hypsilophodon itself, which are not high-ridged in any case. The specific name foxii honours Fox.

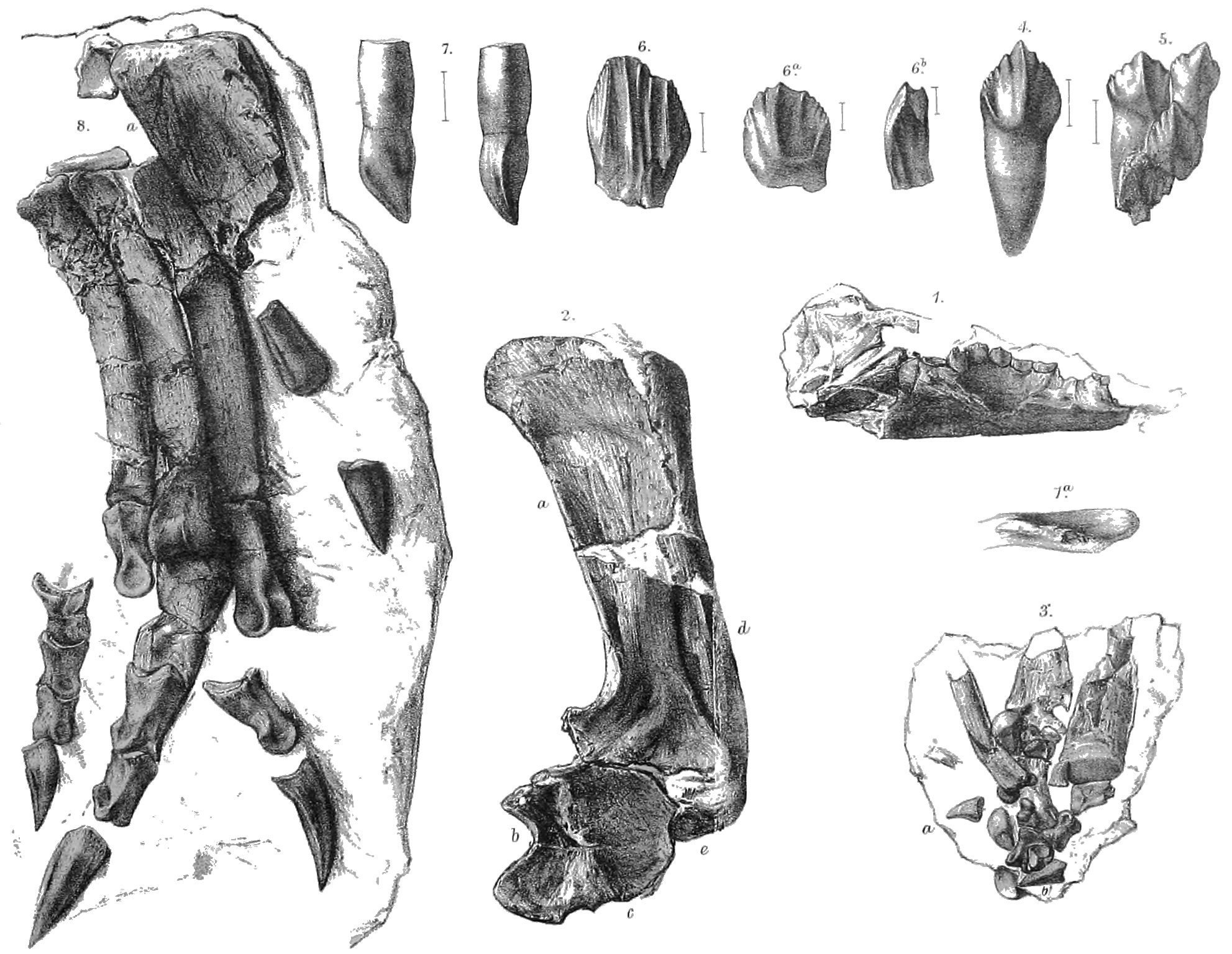
Fossils described in 1873

Immediate reception to Huxley's proposal of a new genus, distinct from Iguanodon, was mixed. The issue of distinctiveness was seen as important as more information on the form of Iguanodon was in demand, and the cranial anatomy in particular was of importance. If the Cowleaze Chine material was a distinct genus, it ceased being useful in this respect. Whilst some palaeontologists such as William Boyd Dawkins and Harry Seeley supported distinction, Fox rejected Huxley's proposal of a distinct genus and subsequently took back his skull and gave it to Owen to study. In attempt to clarify the situation, John Whitaker Hulke returned to the Hypsilophodon fossil bed on the Isle of Wight to obtain more material. He remarked that the whole of the skeleton seemed to be present, but that fragility limited excavation. He published a description of his new specimens in 1873, and based on his examination of the new teeth fossils echoed Fox's sentiments of doubt. Owen followed this with a study comparising at length the teeth of known Iguanodon and those from Fox's specimens. He agreed there were differences, but found them lacking in sufficient distinctiveness to be considered a distinct genus. As such, he renamed the species Iguanodon foxii. But Hulke had by then shifted his opinion, having obtained two new more informative specimens. Building on Huxley's comments on the Mantell-Bowerbank block, he gave focus to vertebral characters. As a result of his study, he concluded Hypsilophodon was a distinct genus related to Iguanodon. He published these findings in a supplementary note, also in 1874. Finally, in 1882 he published a full osteology of the species, considering it of great importance to properly document the taxon as such a wealth of specimens had been discovered and comparison with American dinosaurs was necessary. Fox had by this point died, and no further argument against generic distinctiveness had occurred in the intervening time.

=== Later research ===
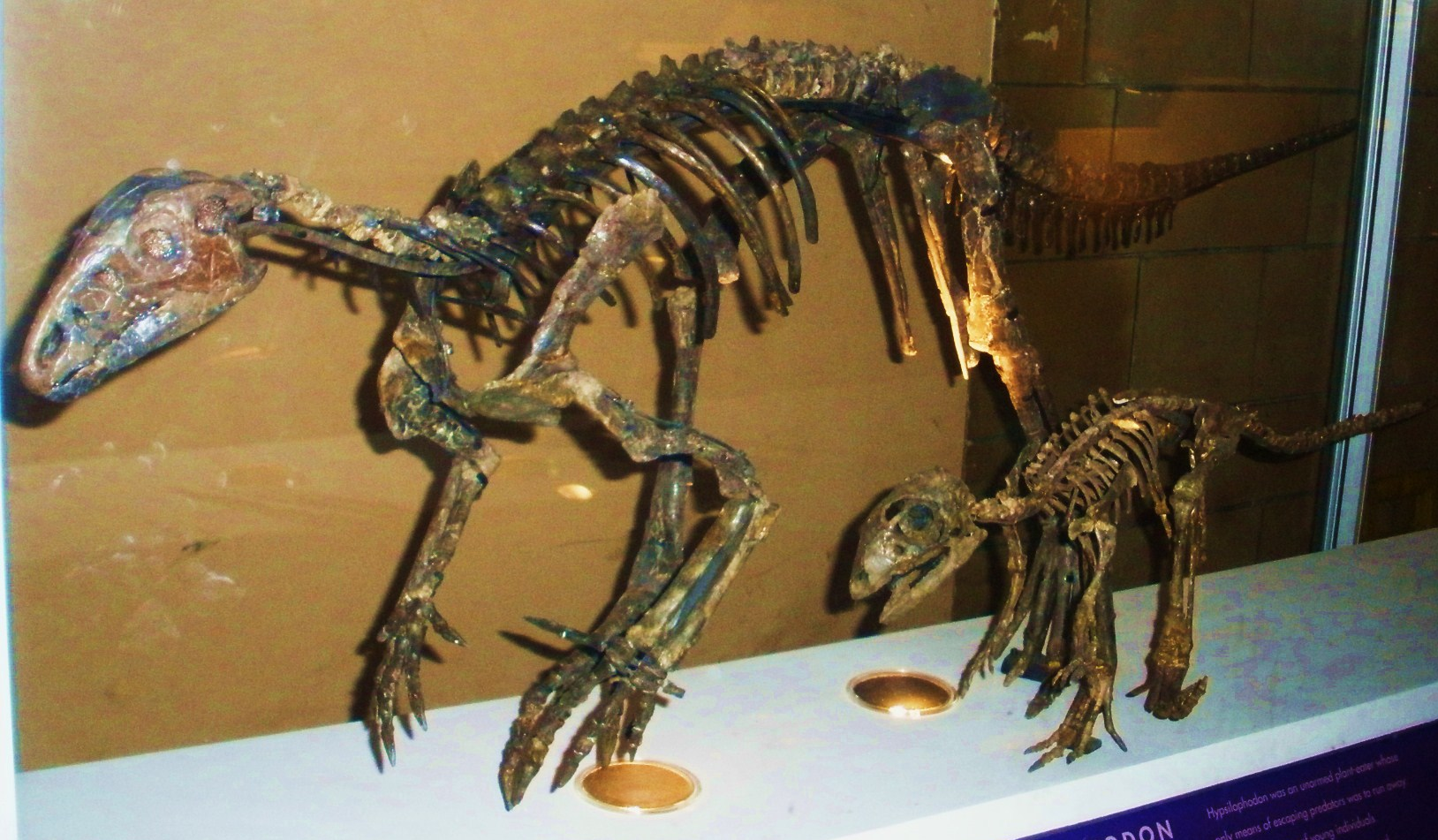
Specimens NHMUK PV R 5829 and NHMUK PV R 5830 at the Natural History Museum, London

Later, the number of specimens was increased by Reginald Walter Hooley. In 1905, Baron Franz Nopcsa dedicated a study to Hypsilophodon, and in 1936 William Elgin Swinton did the same, on the occasion of the mounting of two restored skeletons in the British Museum of Natural History. Most known Hypsilophodon specimens were discovered between 1849 and 1921 and are in the possession of the Natural History Museum that acquired the collections of Mantell, Fox, Hulke and Hooley. These represent about twenty individual animals. Apart from the holotype and paratype, the most significant specimens are: NHM R5829, the skeleton of a large animal; NHMUK PV R 5830 and NHMUK PV R 196/196a, both skeletons of juvenile animals; and NHMUK PV R R2477, a block with a skull together with two separate vertebral columns. Although this was the largest find, new ones continue to be made.

Modern research of Hypsilophodon began with the studies of Peter Malcolm Galton, starting with his thesis of 1967. He and James Jensen briefly described a left femur, AMNH 2585, in 1975, and in 1979 formally coined a second species, Hypsilophodon wielandi, for the specimen. The femur was diagnosed with two supposed minor differences from that of H. foxii. The specimen was found in 1900 in the Black Hills of South Dakota, United States, by George Reber Wieland, who the species was named after. Geologically, it comes from the Lakota Sandstone. This species was seen at the time as indicative of a probable late land bridge between North America and Europe, and of the dinosaur fauna of both continents being similar. Spanish Palaeontologist José Ignacio Ruiz-Omeñaca proposed that H. wielandi was not a species of Hypsilophodon but instead related to or synonymous with "Camptosaurus" valdensis from England, both species being dryosaurids. Galton refuted this in his contribution to a 2012 book, noting the femurs of the two species to be quite different, and that of H. wielandi to be unlike those of dryosaurs. He, as well as other studies before and after Ruiz-Omeñaca's proposal, considered H. wielandi a dubious basal ornithopod, with H. foxii the only species in the genus. Galton elaborated on the invalidity of the species in 2009, noting that the two supposed diagnostic characters were variable in both H. foxii and Orodromeus makelai, making the species dubious. He speculated that it may belong to Zephyrosaurus, from a similar time and place, as no femur was known from that taxon.

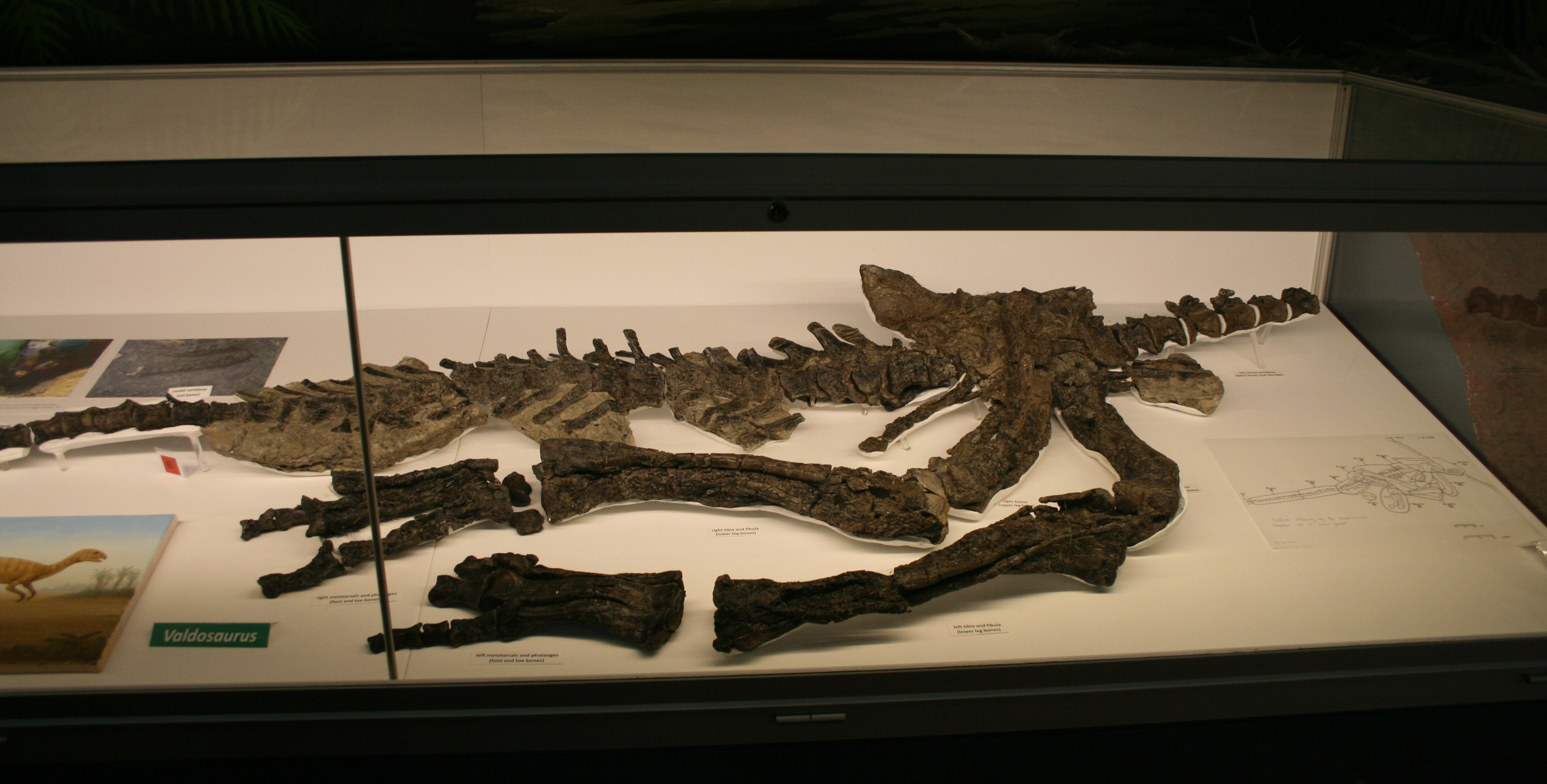
Fossilized skeleton of Valdosaurus from Great Britain; probable remains of this taxon were previously assigned to Hypsilophodon

Fossils from other locations, especially from the mainland of southern Great Britain, Portugal and Spain, have once been referred to Hypsilophodon. However, in 2009 Galton concluded that the specimens from Great Britain proper were either indeterminable or belonged to Valdosaurus, and that the fossils from the rest of Europe were those of related but different species. This leaves the finds on Isle of Wight, off the south coast of England, as the only known authentic Hypsilophodon fossils. The fossils have been found in the Hypsilophodon Bed, a one-metre thick marl layer surfacing in a 1200 metre long strip along the Cowleaze Chine parallel to the southwest coast of Wight, part of the upper Wessex Formation and dating to the late Barremian, about 126 million years old. Reports that Hypsilophodon would be present in the later Vectis Formation, Galton in 2009 considered as unsubstantiated.

== Description ==
Size comparison

Hypsilophodon was a relatively small dinosaur, though not quite as small as, for example, Compsognathus. For Hypsilophodon often a maximum length of 2.3 m (7.5 ft) is stated. This has its origin in a study of 1974 by Galton, in which he extrapolated a length of 2.28 m (7.5 ft) based on specimen BMNH R 167, a thigh bone. However, in 2009, Galton concluded that this femur in fact belonged to Valdosaurus and downsized Hypsilophodon to a maximum known length of 1.8 m (5.9 ft), the largest specimen being NHMUK PV R 5829 with a femur length of 202 millimetres. Typical specimens are about 1.5 m (4.9 ft) long. In 2010, Gregory S. Paul estimated a weight of 20 kg (44 lb) for an animal 2 m (6.6 ft) in length.

Like most small dinosaurs, Hypsilophodon was bipedal: it ran on two legs. Its entire body was built for running. Numerous anatomical features aided this, such as: light-weight, minimized skeleton, low, aerodynamic posture, long legs, and stiff tail — immobilized by ossified tendons for balance. In light of this, Galton in 1974 concluded it would have been among the ornithischians best adapted to running. Despite living in the last of the periods in which non-avian dinosaurs walked the earth, the Cretaceous, Hypsilophodon had a number of seemingly "primitive" features. For example, there were five digits on each hand and four on each foot. With Hypsilophodon the fifth finger had gained a specialised function: being opposable it could serve to grasp food items.

=== Cranial anatomy ===
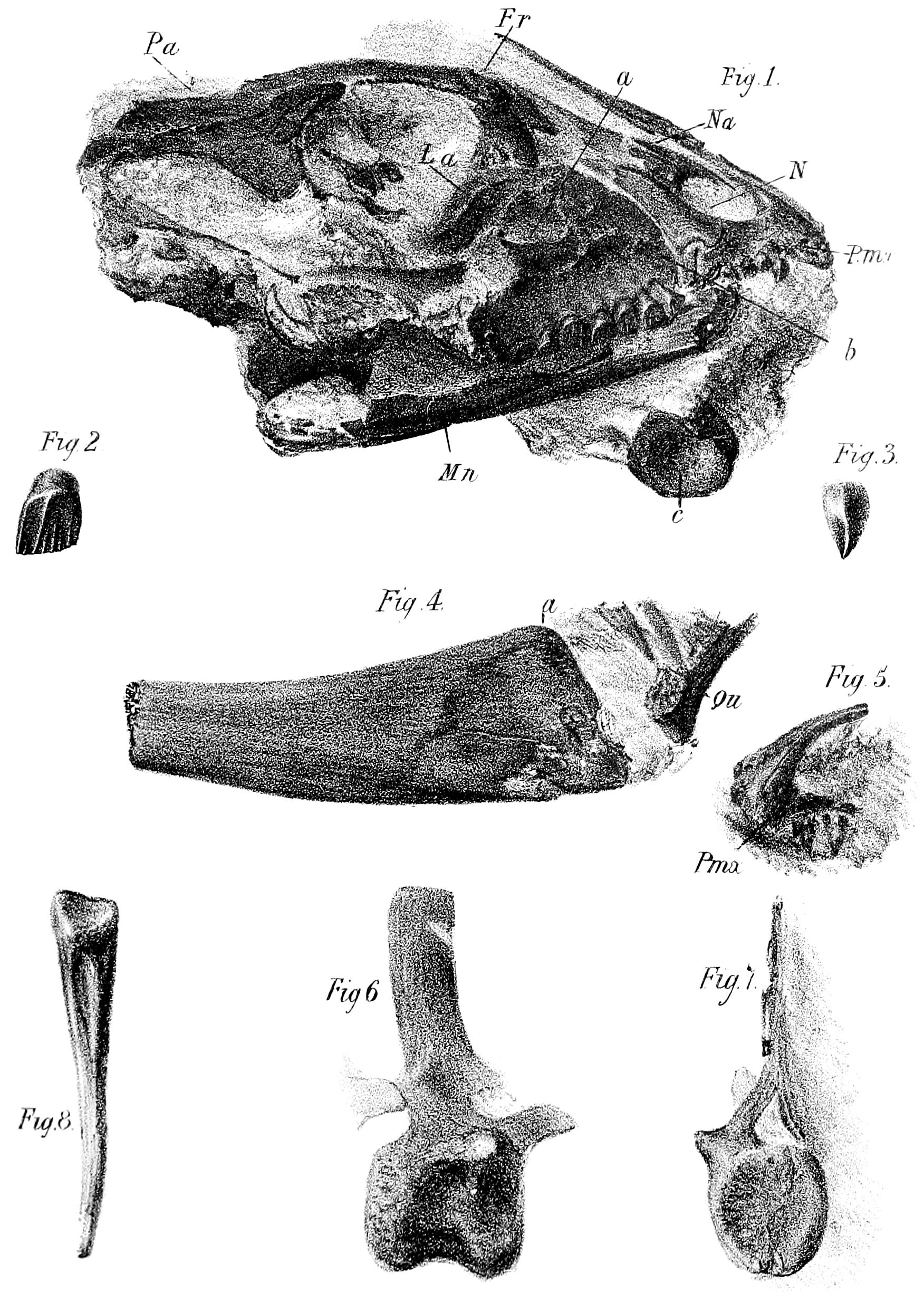
Skull and other bones

In an example of primitive anatomy, although it had a beak like most ornithischians, Hypsilophodon still had five pointed triangular teeth in the front of the upper jaw, the premaxilla. Most herbivorous dinosaurs had, by the Early Cretaceous, become sufficiently specialized that the front teeth had been altogether lost (although there is some debate as to whether these teeth may have had a specialized function in Hypsilophodon). More to the back, the upper jaw carried up to eleven teeth in the maxilla; the lower jaw had up to sixteen teeth. The number was variable, depending on the size of the animal. The teeth to the back were fan-shaped.

The skull of Hypsilophodon was short and relatively large. The snout was triangular in outline and sharply pointed, ending in an upper beak of which the cutting edge was markedly lower than the maxillary tooth row. The eye socket was very large. A palpebral with a length equal to half the diameter of the eye socket overshadowed its top section. A scleral ring of fifteen small bone plates supported the outer eye surface. The back of the skull was rather high, with a very large and high jugal and quadratojugal closing off a highly positioned small infratemporal fenestra.

=== Postcranial anatomy ===
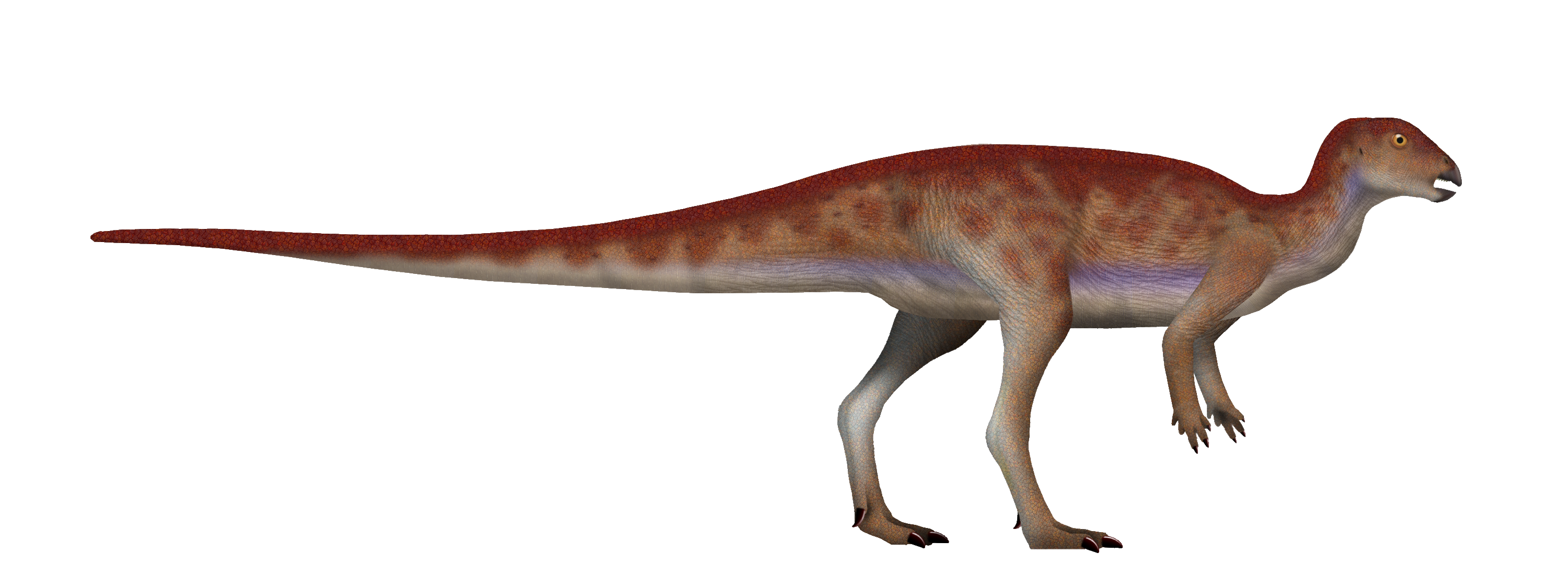
Life restoration

The vertebral column consisted of nine cervical vertebrae, fifteen or sixteen dorsal vertebrae, six or five sacral vertebrae and about forty-eight vertebrae of the tail. Much of the back and the tail was stiffened by long ossified tendons connecting the spines on top of the vertebrae. The processes on the underside of the tail vertebrae, the chevrons, were also connected by ossified tendons, which however were of a different form: they were shorter and split and frayed at one end, with the point of the sharp other end laying within the diverging end of the subsequent tendon. Furthermore, there were several counterdirectional rows of these, resulting in a herring-bone pattern completely immobilising the tail end.

A long-lived misconception concerning the anatomy of Hypsilophodon has been that it was armoured. This was first suggested by Hulke in 1874, after the find of a bone plate in the neck region. If so, Hypsilophodon would have been the only known armoured ornithopod. As Galton pointed out in 2008, the putative armour instead appears to be from the torso, an example of internal intercostal plates associated with the rib cage. It consists of thin mineralized circular plates growing from the back end of the middle rib shaft and overlapping the front edge of the subsequent rib. Such plates are better known from Talenkauen and Thescelosaurus, and were probably cartilaginous in origin.

== Phylogeny ==
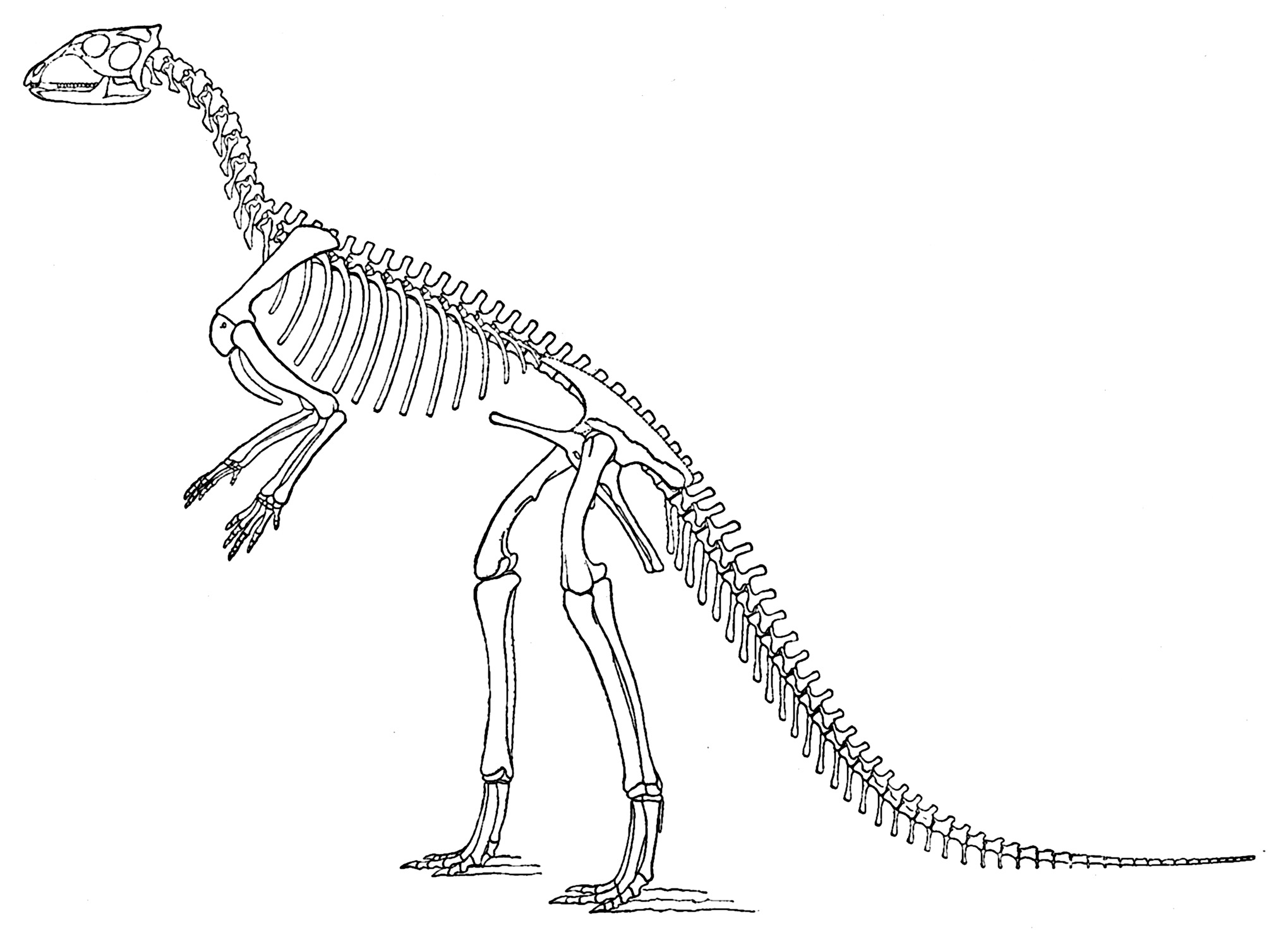
O. C. Marsh's restoration in tripod-pose

Huxley originally assigned Hypsilophodon to the Iguanodontidae. In 1882 Louis Dollo named a separate Hypsilophodontidae. By the middle of the twentieth century that had become the accepted classification but in the early twenty-first century it became clear through cladistic analysis that hypsilophodontids formed an unnatural, paraphyletic group of successive off-shoots from throughout Neornithischia. Hypsilophodon in the modern view thus simply is a basal ornithopod.

In 2014, Norman resolved a monophyletic Hypsilophodontia (avoiding the name "Hypsilophodontidae" due to its complicated history). Hypsilophodon was recovered as the sister taxon to the clade containing Tenontosaurus and Rhabdodontidae.

- Clypeodonta
  - Hypsilophodontia
    - Hypsilophodon
    - - Tenontosaurus
      - Rhabdodontidae
  - Iguanodontia
    - Dryosauridae
    - Ankylopollexia
      - Camptosaurus
      - Styracosterna

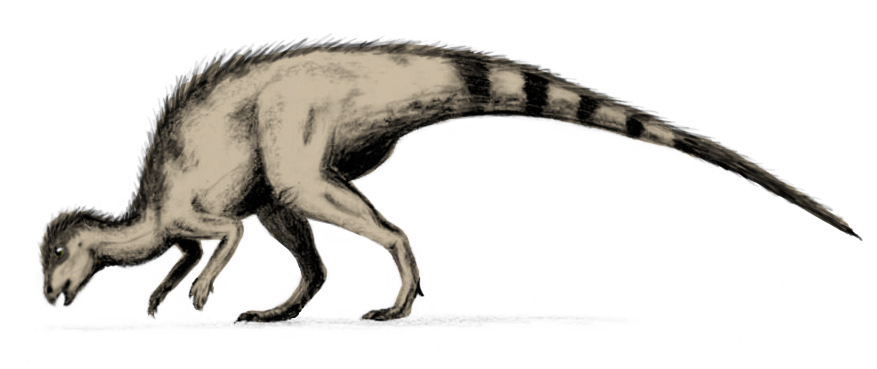
Modern reconstruction with proto-feathers

In 2017, Daniel Madzia, Clint Boyd, and Martin Mazuch reassessed Hypsilophodon outside of Ornithopoda altogether, placing it in a more basal position, as the sister taxon to the Cerapoda; several other "hypsilophodontids" have undergone similar reclassifications. The following cladogram is reproduced from this study:

- Clypeodonta
  - Hypsilophodon
  - Cerapoda
    - Marginocephalia
    - Ornithopoda
      - Gideonmantellia
      - - Elasmaria
        - - Burianosaurus
          - Iguanodontia
            - Rhabdodontomorpha
              - Muttaburrasaurus
              - Rhabdodontidae
            - - Tenontosaurus
              - Dryomorpha
                - Dryosauridae
                - Ankylopollexia
                  - Camptosaurus
                  - - Iguanodon
                    - Ouranosaurus

In one analysis in her 2022 review of iguanodontian phylogenetic relationships, Karen E. Poole recovered a large Hypsilophodontidae as the sister taxon of Iguanodontia, which consisted of several "traditional" hypsilophodontids, as well as Thescelosauridae. The Bayesian topology of her phylogenetic analyses is shown in the cladogram below:

- Clypeodonta
  - Hypsilophodontidae
    - Othnielosaurus
    - - - Jeholosaurus
        - Haya
      - - - Hypsilophodon
          - - Leallynasaura
            - - Gasparinisaura
              - Macrogryphosaurus
        - Thescelosauridae
          - Zephyrosaurus
          - - Orodromeus
            - - Parksosaurus
              - - Thescelosaurus spp.
  - Iguanodontia
    - Rhabdodontoidea
    - Dryomorpha

In 2023, Longrich et al. described Vectidromeus as a new coeval genus of ornithopod closely related to Hypsilophodon. They suggested that Vectidromeus and Hypsilophodon represented the only members of the Hypsilophodontidae, since other taxa previously assigned to the group had subsequently been moved to other clades.

== Paleobiology ==
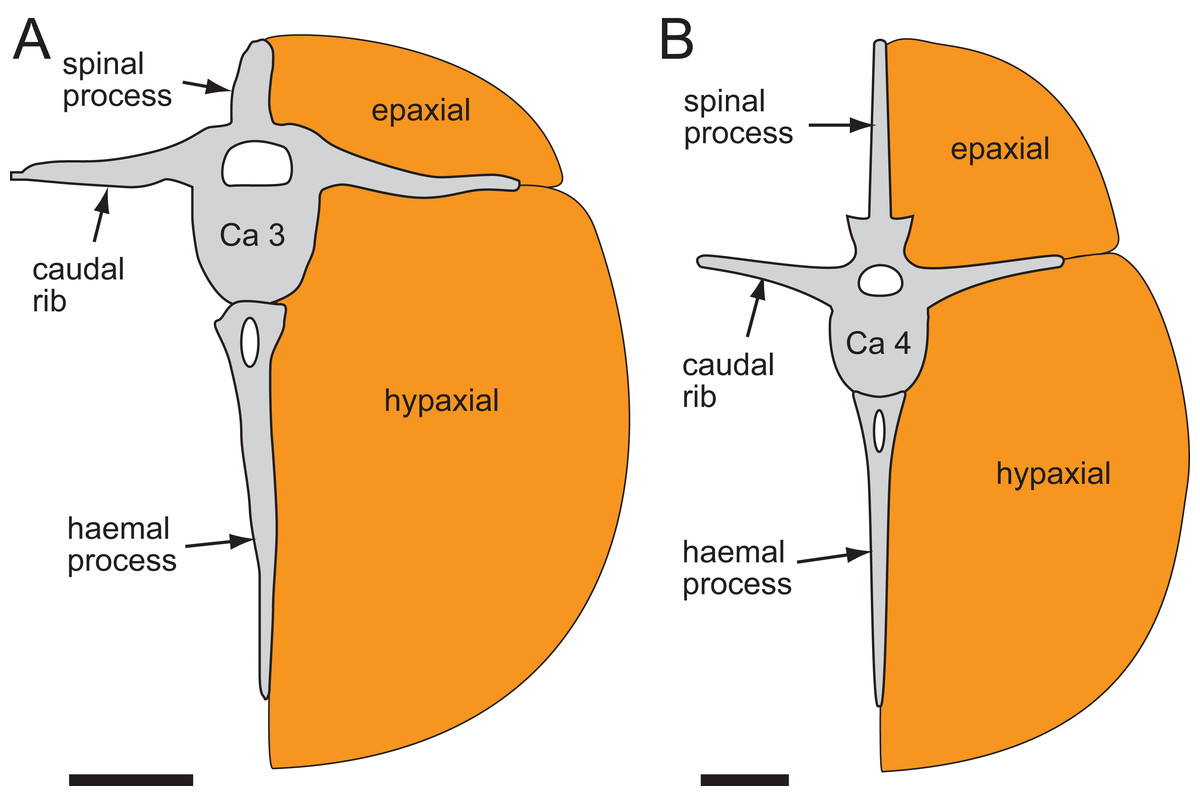
Reconstructions of the tail musculature of Diluvicursor and Hypsilophodon

=== Diet ===
Due to its small size, Hypsilophodon fed on low-growing vegetation, in view of the pointed snout most likely preferring high quality plant material, such as young shoots and roots, in the manner of modern deer. The structure of its skull, with the teeth set far back into the jaw, strongly suggests that it had cheeks, an advanced feature that would have facilitated the chewing of food. There were twenty-three to twenty-seven maxillary and dentary teeth with vertical ridges in the animal's upper and lower jaws which, due to the fact that the tooth row of the lower jaw, its teeth curving outwards, fitted within that of the upper jaw, with its teeth curving inwards, appear to have been self-sharpening, the occlusion wearing down the teeth and providing for a simple chewing mechanism. As in almost all dinosaurs and certainly all the ornithischians, the teeth were continuously replaced in an alternate arrangement, with the two replacement waves moving from the back to the front of the jaw. The Zahnreihen-spacing, the average distance in tooth position between teeth of the same eruption stage, was rather low with Hypsilophodon, about 2,3. Such a dentition would have allowed to process relatively tough plants.

=== Locomotion ===
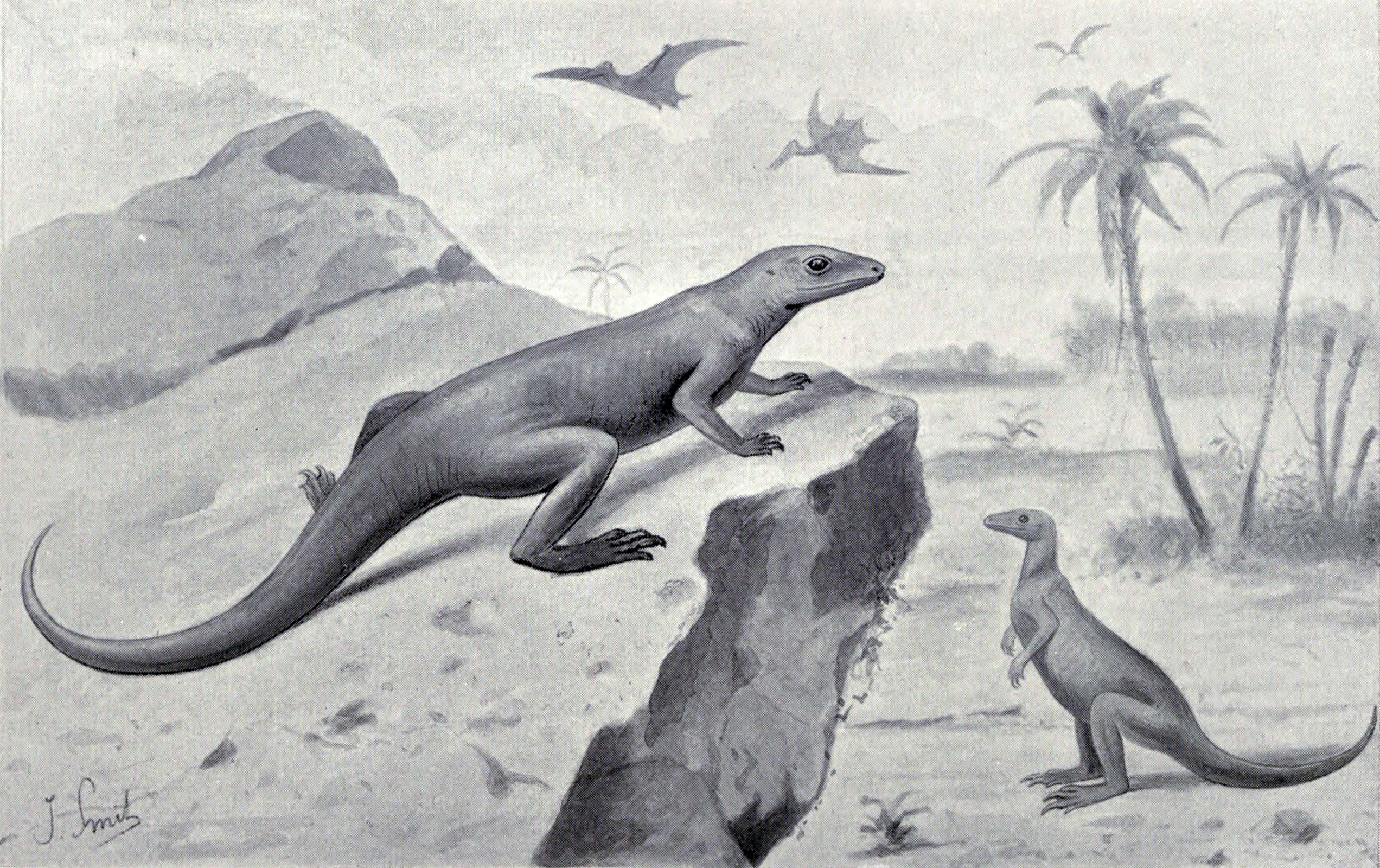
1894 restoration by Joseph Smit showing the animal in both reptilian and kangaroo-like postures

Early paleontologists modelled the body of this small, bipedal, herbivorous dinosaur in various ways. In 1882 Hulke suggested that Hypsilophodon was quadrupedal but also, in view of its grasping hand, able to climb rocks and trees in order to seek shelter. In 1912 this line of thought was further pursued by Austrian paleontologist Othenio Abel. Concluding that the first toe of the foot could function as an opposable hallux, Abel stated that Hypsilophodon was a fully arboreal animal and even that an arboreal lifestyle was primitive for the dinosaurs as a whole. Though this hypothesis was doubted by Nopcsa, it was adopted by the Danish researcher Gerhard Heilmann who in 1916 proposed that a quadrupedal Hypsilophodon lived like the modern tree-kangaroo Dendrolagus. In 1926 Heilmann had again changed his mind, denying that the first toe was opposable because the first metatarsal was firmly connected to the second, but in 1927 Abel refused to accept this. In this he was in 1936 supported by Swinton who claimed that even a forward pointing first metatarsal might carry a movable toe. As Swinton was a very influential populariser of dinosaurs, this remained the accepted view for over three decades, most books typically illustrating Hypsilophodon sitting on a tree branch. However, Peter M. Galton in 1969 performed a more accurate analysis of the musculo-skeletal structure, showing that the body posture was horizontal. In 1971 Galton in detail refuted Abel's arguments, showing that the first toe had been incorrectly reconstructed and that neither the curvature of the claws, nor the level of mobility of the shoulder girdle or the tail could be seen as adaptations for climbing, concluding that Hypsilophodon was a bipedal running form. This convinced the paleontological community that Hypsilophodon remained firmly on the ground.

=== Social behaviour ===
The level of parental care in this dinosaur has not been defined, nests not having been found, although neatly arranged nests are known from related species, suggesting that some care was taken before hatching. The Hypsilophodon fossils were probably accumulated in a single mass mortality event, so it has been considered likely that the animals moved in large groups. For these reasons, the hypsilophodonts, particularly Hypsilophodon, have often been referred to as the "deer of the Mesozoic". Some indications about the reproductive habits are provided by the possibility of sexual dimorphism: Galton considered it likely that exemplars with five instead of six sacral vertebrae — with some specimens the vertebra that should normally count as the first of the sacrum has a rib not touching the pelvis — represented female individuals.

== Bibliography ==
- Parker, Steve (2003). Dinosaurus (1st ed.). Buffalo: Quintet Publishing.
