= List of European dinosaurs =

The Tethys Ocean splitting Laurasia from Gondwana.

Dinosaurs evolved partway through the Triassic period of the Mesozoic era, around 230 Ma (million years ago). At that time, the earth had one supercontinental landmass, called Pangaea, of which Europe was a part. By the start of the Jurassic period, some 30 million years later, the supercontinent began to split into Laurasia and Gondwana. The largest inlet from Panthalassa, the superocean that surrounded Pangaea, was called the Tethys Ocean, and as this inlet cut deeper into the supercontinent, much of Europe was flooded.

By the Cretaceous, from 145 to 66 million years ago, the continents were beginning to approach their present shapes, but not their present positions, and Europe remained tropical. At times, it was a chain of island-microcontinents including Baltica and Iberia.

Europe is relatively rich in fossils from the Jurassic-Cretaceous boundary, and much of what is known about European dinosaurs dates from this time. During the Maastrichtian the end of the Cretaceous dinosaurs were dominating western and Central Europe as the Tremp Formation in Spain dates back to that age. Examples of dinosaurs from Maastrichtian Europe are Struthiosaurus and Canardia.

== Criteria for inclusion ==
- The genus must appear on the List of dinosaur genera.
- At least one named species of the creature must have been found in Europe.

== List of European dinosaurs ==
=== Valid genera ===
Name	Year	Formation	Location	Notes	Images
Abditosaurus	2022	Tremp Formation (Late Cretaceous, Maastrichtian)	Spain	Larger and distantly related to other European sauropods, suggesting it was an immigrant from another continent	
Acanthopholis	1867	Chalk Group (Late Cretaceous, Cenomanian)	United Kingdom (England)	Possessed keeled oval scutes as well as long spines	
Adynomosaurus	2019	Tremp Formation (Late Cretaceous, Maastrichtian)	Spain	Relatively basal despite its late age	
Aepisaurus	1852	Grès verts hevétiques (Early Cretaceous, Albian)	France	Known only from a humerus which shares some features with camarasaurids and titanosaurs	
Ajkaceratops	2010	Csehbánya Formation (Late Cretaceous, Santonian)	Hungary	Known for its sharply hooked upper beak	
Allosaurus	1877	Lourinhã Formation (Late Jurassic, Kimmeridgian)	Portugal	Three species, including the type, are known from the United States. The European species may be a synonym of A. fragilis, but at least one study suggests that it is indeed valid	
Alocodon	1973	Cabaços Formation (Late Jurassic, Oxfordian)	Portugal	Had vertical grooves on its teeth	
Altispinax	1923	Wadhurst Clay Formation (Early Cretaceous, Valanginian)	United Kingdom (England)	Possessed elongated neural spines that may have supported a hump-like structure as in Concavenator	
Amanzia	2020	Reuchenette Formation (Late Jurassic, Kimmeridgian)	Switzerland	One bone preserves fossilized cartilage. Originally believed to be a species of Ornithopsis or Cetiosauriscus	
Ampelosaurus	1995	Argiles et Grès à Reptiles Formation, Grès de Labarre, Gres de Saint-Chinian, Marnes Rouges Inférieures Formation (Late Cretaceous, Maastrichtian)	France	Had three different types of osteoderms, including spines, plates and bulbs	
Anoplosaurus	1879	Cambridge Greensand (Early Cretaceous, Albian)	United Kingdom (England)	Considered an ankylosaur despite the fact no osteoderms have been found. Historically suggested to be an ornithopod	
Aragosaurus	1987	Villar del Arzobispo Formation (Early Cretaceous, Berriasian)	Spain	Reportedly had a unique ischium	
Arcovenator	2014	Argiles et Grès à Reptiles Formation (Late Cretaceous, Campanian)	France	Most closely related to abelisaurids from India and Madagascar	
Arenysaurus	2009	Tremp Formation (Late Cretaceous, Maastrichtian)	Spain	One of the last lambeosaurines prior to their extinction	
Aristosuchus	1887	Wealden Group (Early Cretaceous, Barremian)	United Kingdom (England)	May have had long claws based on referred unguals	
Asylosaurus	2007	Avon Fissure Fill (Late Triassic, Rhaetian)	United Kingdom (England)	Remains originally identified as Thecodontosaurus	
Atsinganosaurus	2010	Argiles et Grès à Reptiles Formation (Late Cretaceous, Maastrichtian)	France	Belongs to a unique clade of southwestern European titanosaurs	
Aviatyrannis	2003	Alcobaça Formation (Late Jurassic, Oxfordian to Tithonian)	Portugal	Although originally described as a tyrannosauroid, it may in fact be the oldest known ornithomimosaur	
Barilium	2010	Wadhurst Clay Formation (Early Cretaceous, Valanginian)	United Kingdom (England)	Robust with strong vertebrae and short neural spines	
Baryonyx	1986	Weald Clay (Early Cretaceous, Barremian)	United Kingdom (England)	One specimen was found with the remains of fish and a juvenile iguanodont in its stomach, suggesting it was a generalist predator	
Betasuchus	1932	Maastricht Formation (Late Cretaceous, Maastrichtian)	Netherlands	The first terrestrial vertebrate named from the Maastrichtian stage	
Blasisaurus	2010	Arén Formation (Late Cretaceous, Maastrichtian)	Spain	Only known from a partial skull but can be distinguished from contemporary lambeosaurines	
Bothriospondylus	1875	Kimmeridge Clay (Late Jurassic, Kimmeridgian)	United Kingdom (England)	Several specimens have been assigned to this genus, but most of them have been reclassified into different genera	
Bradycneme	1975	Sânpetru Formation (Late Cretaceous, Maastrichtian)	Romania	Potentially an alvarezsaurid	
Brighstoneus	2021	Wessex Formation (Early Cretaceous, Barremian)	United Kingdom (England)	Possessed a long snout tipped with a low bump	
Burianosaurus	2017	Peruc-Korycany Formation (Late Cretaceous, Cenomanian)	Czech Republic	May be closely allied to the rhabdodontids	
Calamosaurus	1891	Wessex Formation (Early Cretaceous, Barremian)	United Kingdom (England)	Only known from two cervical vertebrae. Several bones have been referred to it over the years but there is no way to prove all of them belonged to the same genus	
Calamospondylus	1866	Wessex Formation (Early Cretaceous, Hauterivian)	United Kingdom (England)	Only definitively known from a sacrum and associated pelvic elements	
Caletodraco	2024	Chalk of the Pays de Caux (Late Cretaceous, Cenomanian)	France	Possibly the first known non-South American furileusaurian abelisaurid	
Callovosaurus	1980	Oxford Clay (Middle Jurassic, Callovian)	United Kingdom (England)	The oldest known dryosaurid	
Calvarius	2023	Tremp Formation (Late Cretaceous, Maastrichtian)	Spain	May have been a cursorial biped similar to basal ornithopods despite being more derived	
Camarillasaurus	2014	Camarillas Formation (Early Cretaceous, Barremian)	Spain	Described as a ceratosaur but has since been reinterpreted as a spinosaurid	
Camelotia	1985	Westbury Formation (Late Triassic to Early Jurassic, Rhaetian to Hettangian)	United Kingdom (England)	One of the largest known non-sauropod sauropodomorphs	
Canardia	2013	Marnes d'Auzas Formation (Late Cretaceous, Maastrichtian)	France	May have been a close relative of Aralosaurus	
Cardiodon	1841	Forest Marble Formation (Middle Jurassic, Bathonian)	United Kingdom (England)	The first sauropod ever named. Known only from a tooth	
Cariocecus	2025	Papo Seco Formation (Early Cretaceous, Barremian)	Portugal	Represents the first Portuguese iguanodontian skull	
Ceratosuchops	2021	Wessex Formation (Early Cretaceous, Barremian)	United Kingdom (England)	Differs from Baryonyx in subtle details of its skull	
Cetiosauriscus	1927	Oxford Clay (Middle Jurassic, Callovian)	United Kingdom (England)	Has been assigned to a variety of positions around Eusauropoda	
Cetiosaurus	1841	Rutland Formation (Middle Jurassic, Bajocian to Bathonian)	United Kingdom (England)	The first sauropod known from decent remains. Once believed to be a large seagoing animal	
Chondrosteosaurus	1876	Wessex Formation (Early Cretaceous, Barremian)	United Kingdom (England)	The air sacs in its vertebrae were originally believed to be filled with cartilage	
Compsognathus	1859	Alcobaça Formation?, Canjuers Lagerstätte, Solnhofen Limestone (Late Jurassic, Tithonian)	France; Germany; Portugal?	One of the smallest known non-avian dinosaurs	
Comptonatus	2024	Wessex Formation (Early Cretaceous, Barremian to Aptian)	United Kingdom (England)	One of the most completely known ornithopod taxa from the Isle of Wight	
Concavenator	2010	La Huérguina Formation (Early Cretaceous, Barremian)	Spain	Preserves bumps on its ulna which have been interpreted as quill knobs, although they might have been muscle attachments instead	
Craspedodon	1883	Lonzée Member (Late Cretaceous, Santonian)	Belgium	May be the first neoceratopsian known from Europe	
Craterosaurus	1874	Woburn Sands Formation (Early Cretaceous, Aptian to Albian)	United Kingdom (England)	Potentially synonymous with Regnosaurus	
Cruxicheiros	2010	Chipping Norton Limestone (Middle Jurassic, Bathonian)	United Kingdom (England)	Inconsistent in phylogenetic placement	
Cryptosaurus	1869	Ampthill Clay (Late Jurassic, Oxfordian)	United Kingdom (England)	Only known from a single femur	
Cumnoria	1888	Kimmeridge Clay (Late Jurassic, Kimmeridgian)	United Kingdom (England)	May be a species of Camptosaurus or something a little more basal	
Dacentrurus	1902	Alcobaça Formation, Argiles d'Octeville, Kimmeridge Clay, Lourinhã Formation, Villar del Arzobispo Formation (Late Jurassic to Early Cretaceous, Kimmeridgian to Berriasian)	France; Portugal; Spain; United Kingdom (England)	Known from abundant remains. Lived in a broad range	
Demandasaurus	2011	Castrillo de la Reina Formation (Early Cretaceous, Barremian to Aptian)	Spain	Most closely related to African rebbachisaurids, suggesting a faunal exchange	
Dinodocus	1884	Lower Greensand Group (Early Cretaceous, Barremian)	United Kingdom (England)	The only known humerus is almost complete, missing only small portions	
Dolichosuchus	1932	Löwenstein Formation (Late Triassic, Norian)	Germany	Originally classified as a stem-crocodile	
Dornraptor	2024	Blue Lias?/Charmouth Mudstone Formation? (Early Jurassic, Sinemurian)	United Kingdom (England)	Originally thought to belong to Scelidosaurus, its remains were then informally named "Merosaurus" before their formal description in 2024	
Draconyx	2001	Lourinhã Formation (Late Jurassic, Tithonian)	Portugal	May have been a member of an ornithopod clade that did not appear in North America, unlike other groups of Late Jurassic animals	
Dracopelta	1980	Lourinhã Formation (Late Jurassic, Tithonian)	Portugal	The structure of its limbs suggests it might have had a cursorial lifestyle	
Dracoraptor	2016	Blue Lias (Early Jurassic, Hettangian)	United Kingdom (Wales)	May have been a shore dweller due to its island habitat	
Dromaeosauroides	2003	Jydegaard Formation (Early Cretaceous, Berriasian)	Denmark	A referred coprolite has been found which contains fish remains, but it could instead belong to a turtle	
Dubreuillosaurus	2005	Calcaire de Caen (Middle Jurassic, Bathonian)	France	Would have lived in a coastal mangrove swamp	
Duriatitan	2010	Kimmeridge Clay (Late Jurassic, Kimmeridgian)	United Kingdom (England)	Originally named as a species of Cetiosaurus	
Duriavenator	2008	Inferior Oolite (Middle Jurassic, Bajocian)	United Kingdom (England)	The basalmost known member of the Megalosaurinae, which aligns with its stratigraphic position	
Echinodon	1861	Purbeck Group (Early Cretaceous, Berriasian)	United Kingdom (England)	Originally misidentified as a herbivorous lizard	
Efraasia	1973	Löwenstein Formation (Late Triassic, Norian)	Germany	Some remains assigned to this genus were originally classified in separate genera	
Emausaurus	1990	Ciechocinek Formation (Early Jurassic, Toarcian)	Germany	One of the oldest and basalmost thyreophorans	
Eotyrannus	2001	Wessex Formation (Early Cretaceous, Barremian)	United Kingdom (England)	Possessed grasping hands with three long fingers	
Eousdryosaurus	2014	Lourinhã Formation (Late Jurassic, Kimmeridgian)	Portugal	Described as a dryosaurid but one study suggests a close relationship with elasmarians	
Erectopus	1923	La Penthiève Beds (Early Cretaceous, Albian)	France	One of the youngest known European carnosaurs	
Eucamerotus	1872	Wessex Formation (Early Cretaceous, Barremian)	United Kingdom (England)	Preserves extensive evidence of pneumatization	
Eucercosaurus	1879	Cambridge Greensand (Early Cretaceous, Albian)	United Kingdom (England)	Sometimes considered an ankylosaur but one study assigns it to Iguanodontia	
Euronychodon	1991	Argiles et sables de Taveiro (Late Cretaceous, Campanian to Maastrichtian)	Portugal	Only known from teeth. Another species has been found in Uzbekistan	
Europasaurus	2006	Süntel Formation (Late Jurassic, Kimmeridgian)	Germany	Much smaller than other sauropods due to its isolated island habitat	
Europatitan	2017	Castrillo de la Reina Formation (Early Cretaceous, Barremian to Aptian)	Spain	Some of this genus' remains include several vertebrae. The specific name, eastwoodi, honors director Clint Eastwood	
Europelta	2013	Escucha Formation (Early Cretaceous, Albian)	Spain	Almost the entire skeleton is known	
Eustreptospondylus	1964	Oxford Clay (Middle Jurassic to Late Jurassic, Callovian to Oxfordian)	United Kingdom (England)	May have swum between islands similar to a Komodo dragon	
Ferenceratops	2026	Densuș-Ciula Formation, Sânpetru Formation (Late Cretaceous, Maastrichtian)	Romania	Originally named as a species of Zalmoxes but it was reclassified as a ceratopsian	
Foskeia	2026	Castrillo de la Reina Formation (Early Cretaceous, Barremian to Aptian)	Spain	Before its formal description, it had been nicknamed the "Vegagete ornithopod". One of the smallest known ornithopods	
Fylax	2021	Figuerola Formation (Late Cretaceous, Maastrichtian)	Spain	Lived very late despite its comparatively basal position	
Galvesaurus	2005	Villar del Arzobispo Formation (Late Jurassic, Tithonian)	Spain	Also spelled Galveosaurus. Two sets of paleontologists named the same fossil seemingly unaware of each other's work, although there is evidence that one of them had plaigiarized the others, but misspelled the name	
Garrigatitan	2021	Argiles et Grès à Reptiles Formation (Late Cretaceous, Campanian)	France	Known from remains of both adults and subadults	
Garumbatitan	2023	Arcillas de Morella Formation (Early Cretaceous, Barremian)	Spain	Had a reduced claw on the third toe	
Genusaurus	1995	Bevons Beds (Early Cretaceous, Albian)	France	Has been suggested to be either a noasaurid or an abelisaurid	
Gideonmantellia	2012	Camarillas Formation (Early Cretaceous, Barremian)	Spain	Originally misidentified as a specimen of Hypsilophodon	
Gigantosaurus	1869	Kimmeridge Clay (Late Jurassic, Kimmeridgian)	United Kingdom (England)	May have possessed osteoderms	
Haestasaurus	2015	Wealden Group (Early Cretaceous, Berriasian to Valanginian)	United Kingdom (England)	Preserves impressions of differently-sized hexagonal scales	
Halticosaurus	1908	Löwenstein Formation (Late Triassic, Norian)	Germany	Historically conflated with the bones of unrelated animals	
Heptasteornis	1975	Sânpetru Formation (Late Cretaceous, Maastrichtian)	Romania	Once believed to be a giant prehistoric owl	
Hesperonyx	2024	Lourinhã Formation (Late Jurassic, Kimmeridgian)	Portugal	Only known from the remains of the fore- and hindlimbs	
Histriasaurus	1998	Unnamed formation (Early Cretaceous, Hauterivian to Barremian)	Croatia	Despite being discovered in Europe, it may have lived between southern Europe and Africa in life	
Horshamosaurus	2015	Weald Clay (Early Cretaceous, Barremian)	United Kingdom (England)	A supposed tibia has been reinterpreted as an ischium	
Hungarosaurus	2005	Csehbánya Formation (Late Cretaceous, Santonian)	Hungary	Possessed an elevated shoulder which may be an adaptation to high-browsing	
Hylaeosaurus	1833	Bückeberg Formation?, Grinstead Clay Formation, Tunbridge Wells Sand Formation (Early Cretaceous, Valanginian)	Germany? United Kingdom (England)	One of the three animals originally used to define the Dinosauria, along with Iguanodon and Megalosaurus	
Hypselosaurus	1869	Argiles et Grès à Reptiles Formation (Late Cretaceous, Maastrichtian)	France	Several spherical eggs have been attributed to this taxon	
Hypselospinus	2010	Wadhurst Clay Formation (Early Cretaceous, Valanginian)	United Kingdom (England)	Had elongated neural spines projecting from the top of its vertebrae	
Hypsilophodon	1869	Wessex Formation (Early Cretaceous, Hauterivian to Barremian)	United Kingdom (England)	May have been a deer-like low browser that fed on young shoots and roots	
Iberospinus	2022	Papo Seco Formation (Early Cretaceous, Barremian)	Portugal	Basal yet already displays some adaptations for a semiaquatic lifestyle	
Iguanodon	1825	Arcillas de Morella Formation, Camarillas Formation, Sainte-Barbe Clays Formation, Wadhurst Clay Formation, Weald Clay, Wealden Group, Wessex Formation (Early Cretaceous, Barremian to Aptian)	Belgium; Germany? Spain; United Kingdom (England)	Multiple remains are known which make it one of the best known dinosaurs	
Iliosuchus	1932	Taynton Limestone Formation (Middle Jurassic, Bathonian)	United Kingdom (England)	Only known from three ilia	
Invictibellatrix	2026	Wessex Formation (Early Cretaceous, Barremian)	United Kingdom (England)	The first confirmed megaraptoran known from Europe	
Istiorachis	2025	Wessex Formation (Early Cretaceous, Barremian)	United Kingdom (England)	Possessed a sail-like structure formed by elongated neural spines	
Iuticosaurus	1993	Upper Greensand Formation, Wessex Formation (Early Cretaceous to Late Cretaceous, Berriasian to Cenomanian)	United Kingdom (England)	Two species have been named, each from a single caudal vertebra	
Juratyrant	2013	Kimmeridge Clay (Late Jurassic, Tithonian)	United Kingdom (England)	Originally named as a species of Stokesosaurus	
Juravenator	2006	Torleite Formation (Late Jurassic, Kimmeridgian)	Germany	Impressions of both scales and feathers are known. The tail preserves structures that may be integumentary sense organs like those of crocodiles, which it may have used to prey on fish at night	
Kryptohadros	2026	Densuș-Ciula Formation (Late Cretaceous, Maastrichtian)	Romania	Represents the family Telmatosauridae, a clade of exclusively southeastern European hadrosauroids	
Lexovisaurus	1957	Oxford Clay (Middle Jurassic, Callovian)	United Kingdom (England)	Its pelvis was greatly enlarged	
Liliensternus	1984	Trossingen Formation (Late Triassic, Norian to Rhaetian)	Germany	Although commonly depicted with a head crest, there is no evidence for such a feature	
Lirainosaurus	1999	Marnes Rouges Inférieures Formation?, Sierra Perenchiza Formation, Sobrepena Formation (Late Cretaceous, Campanian to Maastrichtian)	France? Spain	For a titanosaur, it was small and had a relatively gracile build	
Lohuecotitan	2016	Villalba de la Sierra Formation (Late Cretaceous, Campanian to Maastrichtian)	Spain	May have had "bulb-and-root"-type osteoderms, which are abundant at the type locality	
Lophostropheus	2007	Moon-Airel Formation (Late Triassic to Early Jurassic, Rhaetian to Hettangian)	France	The only substantially well-known theropod from the Triassic-Jurassic boundary	
Loricatosaurus	2008	Marnes à Belemnopsis latesulcatus Formation, Oxford Clay (Middle Jurassic, Callovian)	France; United Kingdom (England)	Had narrow, flat plates on its back and round, pointed spines that ran along the tail	
Losillasaurus	2001	Villar del Arzobispo Formation (Late Jurassic to Early Cretaceous?, Kimmeridgian to Berriasian?)	Spain	Was heterodont, having four types of teeth, one of which was heart-shaped	
Lourinhanosaurus	1998	Lourinhã Formation (Late Jurassic, Kimmeridgian to Tithonian)	Portugal	More than one hundred eggs have been referred to this taxon	
Lourinhasaurus	1998	Lourinhã Formation (Late Jurassic, Kimmeridgian)	Portugal	Closely related to Camarasaurus but with proportionately longer forelimbs	
Lusotitan	2003	Lourinhã Formation (Late Jurassic, Tithonian)	Portugal	Originally named as a European species of Brachiosaurus	
Lusovenator	2020	Lourinhã Formation (Late Jurassic to Early Cretaceous, Kimmeridgian to Berriasian)	Portugal	The oldest carcharodontosaurian known from Eurasia	
Macrurosaurus	1869	Cambridge Greensand, Chalk Group? (Early Cretaceous, Albian)	United Kingdom (England)	Only known from a series of caudal vertebrae	
Magnamanus	2016	Golmayo Formation (Early Cretaceous, Hauterivian to Barremian)	Spain	Possessed relatively enlarged hands	
Magnosaurus	1932	Inferior Oolite (Middle Jurassic, Bajocian)	United Kingdom (England)	Confusingly, a referred specimen was simultaneously named as a species of this genus and of Sarcosaurus	
Magyarosaurus	1932	Sânpetru Formation (Late Cretaceous, Maastrichtian)	Romania	An insular dwarf titanosaur that was one of the smallest of its group	
Mantellisaurus	2007	Arcillas de Morella Formation, La Huérguina Formation, Lower Greensand Group, Sainte-Barbe Clays Formation, Vectis Formation, Wessex Formation (Early Cretaceous, Barremian to Aptian)	Belgium; Germany? Spain; United Kingdom (England)	Several specimens are known. Distinguishable from the contemporary Iguanodon by its more gracile build	
Marmarospondylus	1875	Forest Marble Formation (Middle Jurassic, Bathonian)	United Kingdom (England)	Usually assigned to the genus Bothriospondylus, but this cannot be confirmed	
Matheronodon	2017	Argiles et Grès à Reptiles Formation (Late Cretaceous, Campanian)	France	Had extremely specialized dentition that may have been an adaptation to feeding on tough monocot plants	
Megalosaurus	1824	Chipping Norton Limestone, Taynton Limestone Formation (Middle Jurassic, Bathonian)	United Kingdom (England)	The first non-avian dinosaur scientifically named and described	
Metriacanthosaurus	1964	Oxford Clay (Late Jurassic, Oxfordian)	United Kingdom (England)	Possessed relatively tall neural spines for a carnosaur	
Miragaia	2009	Lourinhã Formation (Late Jurassic, Kimmeridgian to Tithonian)	Portugal	Had an extremely elongated neck made up of seventeen vertebrae. May be synonymous with Dacentrurus	
Mochlodon	1881	Csehbánya Formation, Gosau Group (Late Cretaceous, Santonian to Campanian)	Austria; Hungary	Originally named as a species of Iguanodon	
Morelladon	2015	Arcillas de Morella Formation (Early Cretaceous, Barremian)	Spain	Possessed a neural spine sail lower than that of Ouranosaurus	
Morinosaurus	1874	Unnamed formation (Late Jurassic, Kimmeridgian)	France	Poorly known	
Neosodon	1885	Sables et Grès à Trigonia gibbosa (Late Jurassic, Tithonian)	France	No species are assigned to this genus. Popularly associated with "Iguanodon" praecursor but is in fact a separate taxon	
Neovenator	1996	Wessex Formation (Early Cretaceous, Hauterivian to Barremian)	United Kingdom (England)	Had a complex series of neurovascular canals lining its snout	
Newtonsaurus	2025	Lilstock Formation (Late Triassic, Rhaetian)	United Kingdom (Wales)	Once considered indeterminate within Archosauria	
Normanniasaurus	2013	Poudingue Ferrugineux (Early Cretaceous, Albian)	France	Represents a European radiation of basal titanosaurs	
Notatesseraeraptor	2019	Klettgau Formation (Late Triassic, Norian)	Switzerland	Combines features of different groups of basal theropods	
Nuthetes	1854	Lulworth Formation (Early Cretaceous, Berriasian)	United Kingdom (England)	Only known from jaws and teeth. Traditionally identified as a dromaeosaurid but it might be a proceratosaurid instead	
Obelignathus	2025	Argiles et Grès à Reptiles Formation (Late Cretaceous, Campanian to Maastrichtian)	France	Originally named as a species of Rhabdodon, but was given its own genus due to morphological and phylogenetic differences	
Oblitosaurus	2023	Villar del Arzobispo Formation (Late Jurassic, Kimmeridgian to Tithonian)	Spain	The largest ornithopod known from the Late Jurassic of Europe	
Oceanotitan	2019	Lourinhã Formation (Late Jurassic, Kimmeridgian)	Portugal	Potentially the oldest known somphospondylian	
Ohmdenosaurus	1978	Posidonia Shale (Early Jurassic, Toarcian)	Germany	Originally misidentified as a plesiosaur	
Oplosaurus	1852	Wessex Formation (Early Cretaceous, Barremian)	United Kingdom (England)	The holotype tooth was pointed, which led to its misidentification as a carnivorous reptile	
Ornithodesmus	1887	Wessex Formation (Early Cretaceous, Barremian)	United Kingdom (England)	Historically conflated with the remains of the pterosaur Istiodactylus	
Ornithopsis	1870	Wealden Group (Early Cretaceous, Barremian)	Germany? United Kingdom (England)	Originally believed to be an intermediate form between birds, pterosaurs and dinosaurs	
Orthomerus	1883	Maastricht Formation (Late Cretaceous, Maastrichtian)	Netherlands	Potentially dubious and undiagnostic	
Ostromia	2017	Painten Formation (Late Jurassic, Tithonian)	Germany	Considered a small pterosaur until it was redescribed as a specimen of Archaeopteryx in 1970. Some of its features are similar to those of Anchiornis	
Owenodon	2009	Lulworth Formation (Early Cretaceous, Berriasian)	United Kingdom (England)	Has been assigned to Iguanodon and Camptosaurus before it received its own genus	
Paludititan	2010	Sânpetru Formation (Late Cretaceous, Maastrichtian)	Romania	Some of its bones are identical to those of Magyarosaurus, but their synonymy cannot be confirmed	
Paludohadros	2026	Weald Clay (Early Cretaceous, Barremian)	United Kingdom (England)	Would have lived in a swampy environment	
Pararhabdodon	1993	Tremp Formation (Late Cretaceous, Maastrichtian)	Spain	The first lambeosaurine identified from Europe	
Pareisactus	2019	Tremp Formation (Late Cretaceous, Maastrichtian)	Spain	Represented by a single scapula recovered from a hadrosaur bonebed	
Paulodon	2025	Camarillas Formation (Early Cretaceous, Barremian)	Spain	Previously assigned to the contemporary Iguanodon	
Pelecanimimus	1994	La Huérguina Formation (Early Cretaceous, Barremian)	Spain	Preserves extensive soft tissue impressions revealing the presence of a keratinous head crest and a pelican-like gular pouch	
Pelorosaurus	1850	Tunbridge Wells Sand Formation (Early Cretaceous, Hauterivian)	United Kingdom (England)	The first sauropod identified as a terrestrial animal	
Pendraig	2021	Pant-y-Ffynnon Quarry (Late Triassic, Rhaetian)	United Kingdom (Wales)	Would have lived on a dry limestone island	
Petrustitan	2025	Sânpetru Formation (Late Cretaceous, Maastrichtian)	Romania	Formerly identified as a species of Magyarosaurus, but it is markedly different from that genus	
Phyllodon	1973	Alcobaça Formation (Late Jurassic, Kimmeridgian)	Portugal	The front and back of its teeth were asymmetrical	
Piveteausaurus	1977	Marnes de Dives (Middle Jurassic, Callovian)	France	Has been suggested to be a species of Proceratosaurus	
Plateosaurus	1837	Klettgau Formation, Löwenstein Formation, Lunde Formation, Trossingen Formation (Late Triassic, Norian)	France? Germany; Norway; Switzerland	Known from over a hundred skeletons, several of them nearly complete	
Pneumatoraptor	2010	Csehbánya Formation (Late Cretaceous, Santonian)	Hungary	One study suggests a position as a possible early palaeognath	
Poekilopleuron	1836	Calcaire de Caen (Middle Jurassic, Bathonian)	France	Its holotype was found alongside fish remains	
Polacanthus	1865	Wessex Formation (Early Cretaceous, Barremian)	United Kingdom (England)	Possessed a flat sacral shield dotted with small bumps	
Portellsaurus	2021	Margas de Mirambell Formation (Early Cretaceous, Barremian)	Spain	Closely related to Ouranosaurus	
Priodontognathus	1875	Lower Calcareous Grit (Late Jurassic, Oxfordian)	United Kingdom (England)	Only known from a single maxilla with teeth	
Proa	2012	Escucha Formation (Early Cretaceous, Albian)	Spain	The tip of its jaw was shaped like the bow of a ship	
Proceratosaurus	1926	Great Oolite Group (Middle Jurassic, Bathonian)	United Kingdom (England)	Preserves a small horn on its snout which may have anchored a crest as in the related Guanlong	
Procompsognathus	1913	Löwenstein Formation (Late Triassic, Norian)	Germany	Has been suggested to be non-dinosaurian	
Protathlitis	2023	Arcillas de Morella Formation (Early Cretaceous, Barremian)	Spain	Described as a basal baryonychine spinosaurid, but a recent study suggested the type material may be chimeric, regarding this genus as probably dubious	
Pterospondylus	1913	Trossingen Formation (Late Triassic, Norian)	Germany	Known from only a single, large vertebra	
Pyroraptor	2000	Argiles et Grès à Reptiles Formation (Late Cretaceous, Campanian to Maastrichtian)	France	Its holotype specimen was exposed by a forest fire	
Qunkasaura	2024	Villalba de la Sierra Formation (Late Cretaceous, Campanian to Maastrichtian)	Spain	May have been closely related to Abditosaurus	
Regnosaurus	1848	Tunbridge Wells Sand Formation (Early Cretaceous, Berriasian to Valanginian)	United Kingdom (England)	Potentially a stegosaur similar to Huayangosaurus	
Rhabdodon	1869	Grès de Labarre, Gres de Saint-Chinian, Marnes Rouges Inférieures Formation, Villalba de la Sierra Formation (Late Cretaceous, Maastrichtian)	France; Spain	Although most rhabdodontids are insular dwarfs, this genus may represent an instance of island gigantism as it is much larger than other members of its family	
Riabininohadros	2020	Unnamed formation (Late Cretaceous, Maastrichtian)	Ukraine	Possessed a femur so unique it has no morphological equivalents across all of Iguanodontia	
Riojavenatrix	2024	Enciso Group (Early Cretaceous, Barremian to Aptian)	Spain	Originally identified as a specimen of Baryonyx	
Riparovenator	2021	Wessex Formation (Early Cretaceous, Barremian)	United Kingdom (England)	Had elongated spines projecting from its caudal vertebrae somewhat similar to those of Spinosaurus	
Ruehleia	2001	Trossingen Formation (Late Triassic, Norian)	Germany	Known from a single, nearly complete skeleton	
Saltriovenator	2018	Saltrio Formation (Early Jurassic, Sinemurian)	Italy	The biggest theropod from the Early Jurassic yet known	
Sarcolestes	1893	Oxford Clay (Middle Jurassic, Callovian)	United Kingdom (England)	Originally misidentified as a carnivorous dinosaur	
Sarcosaurus	1921	Scunthorpe Mudstone (Early Jurassic, Hettangian to Sinemurian)	United Kingdom (England)	Has been variously suggested to be in different positions at the base of Neotheropoda	
Scelidosaurus	1859	Charmouth Mudstone Formation (Early Jurassic, Sinemurian to Pliensbachian)	United Kingdom (England)	Carried hundreds of small osteoderms in several rows along its back	
Schleitheimia	2020	Klettgau Formation (Late Triassic, Norian)	Switzerland	Possessed a relatively enlarged ilium	
Scipionyx	1998	Pietraroja Plattenkalk (Early Cretaceous, Albian)	Italy	So well preserved that several internal organs and their positions in life could be accurately reconstructed	
Sciurumimus	2012	Torleite Formation (Late Jurassic, Kimmeridgian)	Germany	Had a bushy tail similar to that of a squirrel	
Soriatitan	2017	Golmayo Formation (Early Cretaceous, Hauterivian to Barremian)	Spain	The first confirmed brachiosaurid known from Early Cretaceous Europe	
Stenopelix	1857	Obernkirchen Sandstein (Early Cretaceous, Berriasian)	Germany	Possibly closely related to basal ceratopsians from Late Jurassic China	
Streptospondylus	1832	Marnes de Dives?/Marnes de Villers? (Middle Jurassic to Late Jurassic, Callovian to Oxfordian)	France	Originally believed to represent a marine crocodile	
Struthiosaurus	1871	Argiles et Grès à Reptiles Formation, Gosau Group, Sânpetru Formation (Late Cretaceous, Santonian to Maastrichtian)	Austria; France; Hungary? Romania	Analysis of its braincase suggests poor hearing and a sluggish, solitary lifestyle	
Syngonosaurus	1879	Cambridge Greensand (Early Cretaceous, Albian)	United Kingdom (England)	Usually considered a synonym of Acanthopholis but it has been reinterpreted as an iguanodont	
Tamarro	2021	Tremp Formation (Late Cretaceous, Maastrichtian)	Spain	May have been closely related to Asian troodontids	
Tanystrosuchus	1963	Löwenstein Formation (Late Triassic, Norian)	Germany	The only known vertebra was once misidentified as a phytosaur	
Tarascosaurus	1991	Fuvelian Beds (Late Cretaceous, Campanian)	France	If an abelisaurid it would be one of the few northern members of the group	
Tastavinsaurus	2008	Forcall Formation, Xert Formation (Early Cretaceous, Barremian)	Spain	Could represent an obscure group of macronarians called Laurasiformes	
Teinurosaurus	1928	Mont-Lambert Formation (Late Jurassic, Tithonian)	France	Poorly known	
Telmatosaurus	1903	Sânpetru Formation (Late Cretaceous, Maastrichtian)	Romania	One specimen preserves a facial deformity caused by an ameloblastoma	
Tethyshadros	2009	Calcare di Aurisina (Late Cretaceous, Campanian)	Italy	Had limbs adapted for high speed but were too short for running	
Thecocoelurus	1923	Wessex Formation (Early Cretaceous, Barremian)	United Kingdom (England)	Has been assigned to a variety of theropod groups throughout history	
Thecodontosaurus	1836	Magnesian Conglomerate (Late Triassic, Rhaetian)	United Kingdom (England)	Could have been an extremely fast bipedal runner	
Thecospondylus	1882	Wealden Group (Early Cretaceous, Valanginian to Hauterivian)	United Kingdom (England)	Indeterminate within Dinosauria	
Torvosaurus	1979	Kimmeridge Clay?, Lourinhã Formation, Ornatenton Formation, Vega Formation? (Middle Jurassic to Late Jurassic, Callovian to Tithonian)	Germany; Portugal; Spain? United Kingdom (England?)	The type species was found in the United States. Several species lived around the world, including in Europe, but T. gurneyi is the only non-North American species to receive a formal name, though one recent analysis has suggested it may be the same taxon as T. tanneri. It represents Europe's largest terrestrial predator	
Transylvanosaurus	2022	Pui Beds (Late Cretaceous, Maastrichtian)	Romania	Had an unusually wide skull compared to other rhabdodontids	
Trimucrodon	1973	Lourinhã Formation (Late Jurassic, Kimmeridgian)	Portugal	Possessed wedge-shaped teeth	
Tuebingosaurus	2022	Trossingen Formation (Late Triassic, Norian)	Germany	Although originally assigned to Plateosaurus, it contains several features that point to a more derived position	
Turiasaurus	2006	Villar del Arzobispo Formation (Late Jurassic, Kimmeridgian to Tithonian)	Spain	Extremely large despite not being a member of Neosauropoda	
Uriash	2025	Densuș-Ciula Formation (Late Cretaceous, Maastrichtian)	Romania	One of the largest European sauropods	
Valdosaurus	1977	Weald Clay, Wealden Group, Wessex Formation (Early Cretaceous, Berriasian to Barremian)	United Kingdom (England)	Large and similar to Dryosaurus	
Vallibonavenatrix	2019	Arcillas de Morella Formation (Early Cretaceous, Barremian)	Spain	One of the most complete spinosaurids known from Iberia	
Variraptor	1998	Argiles et Grès à Reptiles Formation (Late Cretaceous, Campanian to Maastrichtian)	France	May be closely related to Bambiraptor	
Vectaerovenator	2020	Lower Greensand Group (Early Cretaceous, Aptian)	United Kingdom (England)	Only known from four vertebrae but are distinct enough to be classified as their own genus	
Vectidromeus	2024	Wessex Formation (Early Cretaceous, Barremian)	United Kingdom (England)	Originally described as a relative of the coeval Hypsilophodon, but a subsequent analysis suggests possible dryosaurid affinities for this genus	
Vectipelta	2023	Wessex Formation (Early Cretaceous, Hauterivian to Barremian)	United Kingdom (England)	May have been more closely related to Asian ankylosaurs than to European ones	
Vectiraptor	2021	Wessex Formation (Early Cretaceous, Barremian)	United Kingdom (England)	Shares some features with North American dromaeosaurids	
Velocipes	1932	Lissauer Breccia (Late Triassic, Norian)	Poland	Has been considered a dubious, indeterminate vertebrate	
Volgatitan	2018	Unnamed formation (Early Cretaceous, Hauterivian)	Russia	Closely related to South American titanosaurs	
Vouivria	2017	Calcaires de Clerval (Late Jurassic, Oxfordian)	France	The oldest known titanosauriform	
Wiehenvenator	2016	Ornatenton Formation (Middle Jurassic, Callovian)	Germany	Before its formal description, it had been nicknamed the "Minden Monster"	
Xenoposeidon	2007	Wealden Group (Early Cretaceous, Berriasian to Valanginian)	United Kingdom (England)	Only known from a single, very unique vertebra	
Zalmoxes	2003	Densuș-Ciula Formation, Sânpetru Formation, Sebeș Formation (Late Cretaceous, Maastrichtian)	Romania	Has been suggested to be a European ceratopsian	
Zby	2014	Lourinhã Formation (Late Jurassic, Kimmeridgian)	Portugal	Originally believed to be a specimen of Turiasaurus	

=== Invalid and potentially valid genera ===
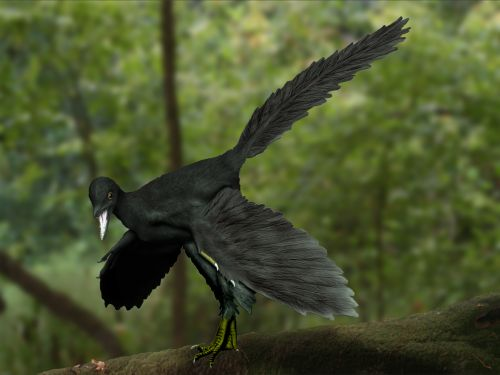
Archaeopteryx

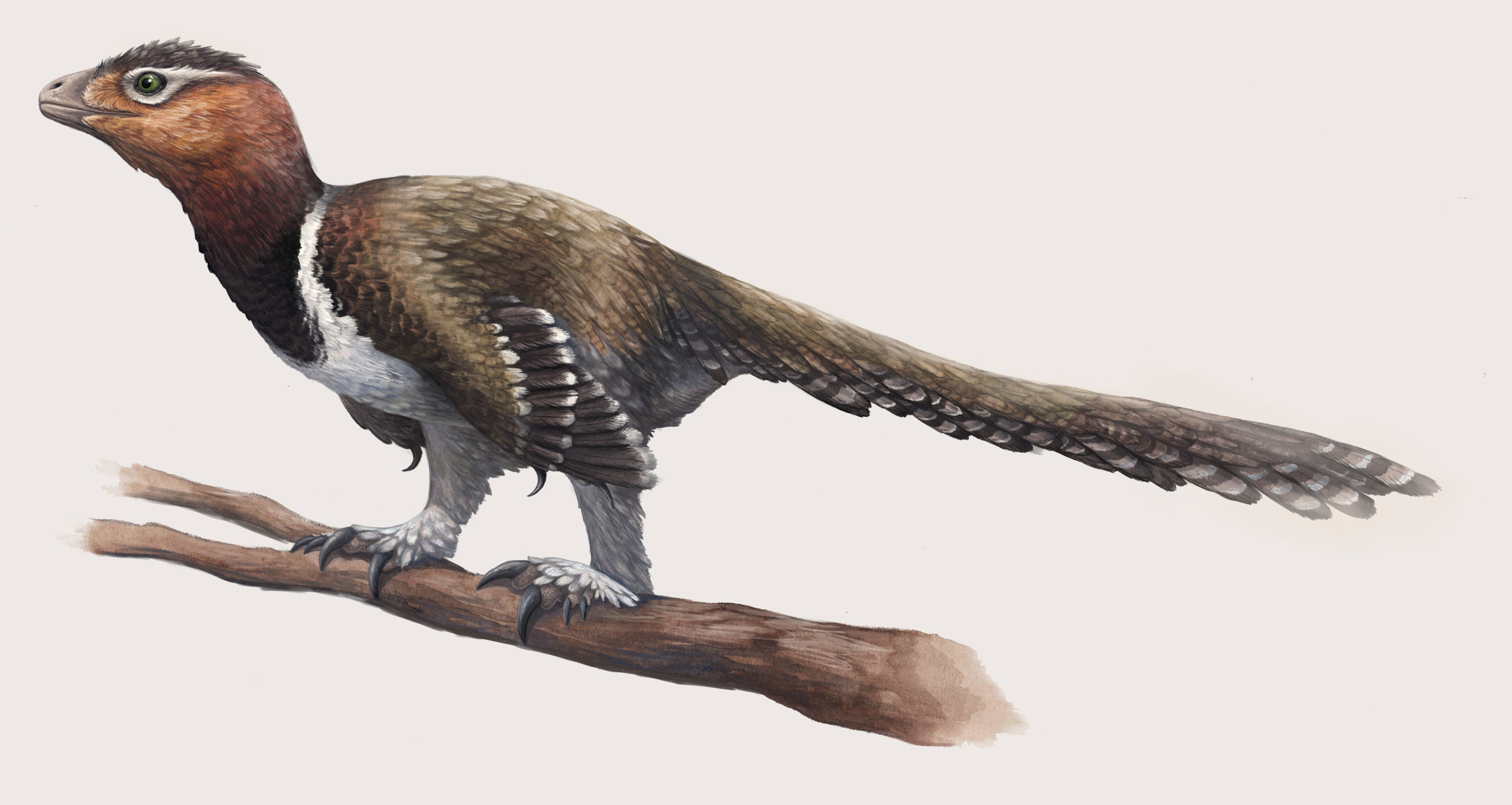
Balaur

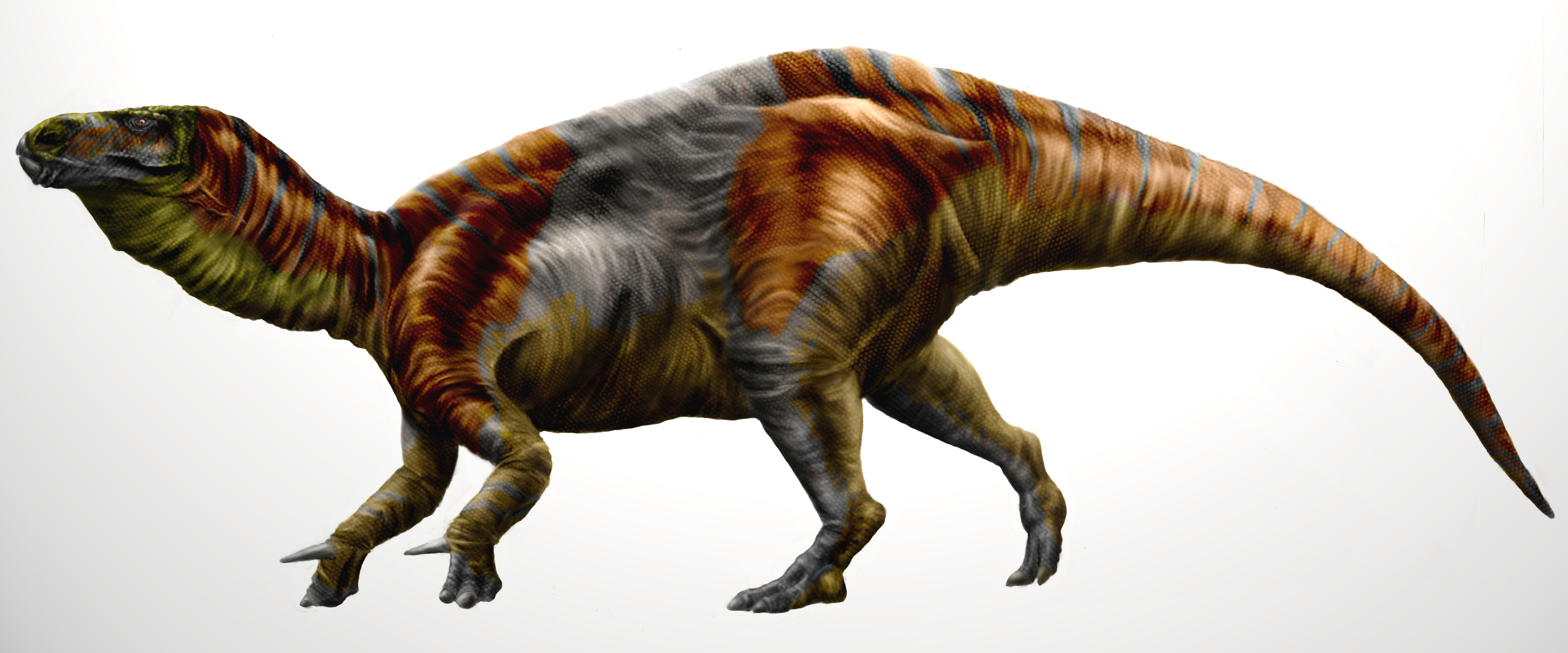
Delapparentia

Dinheirosaurus

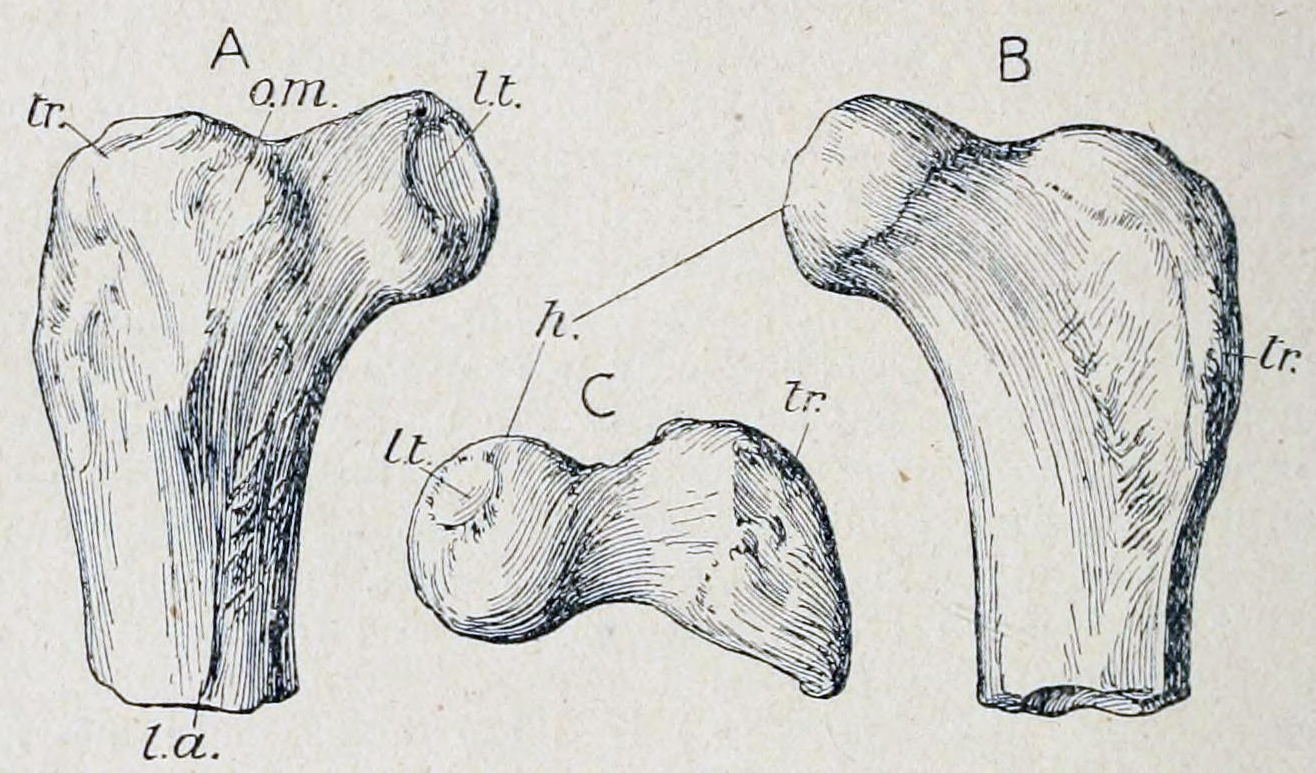
Elopteryx

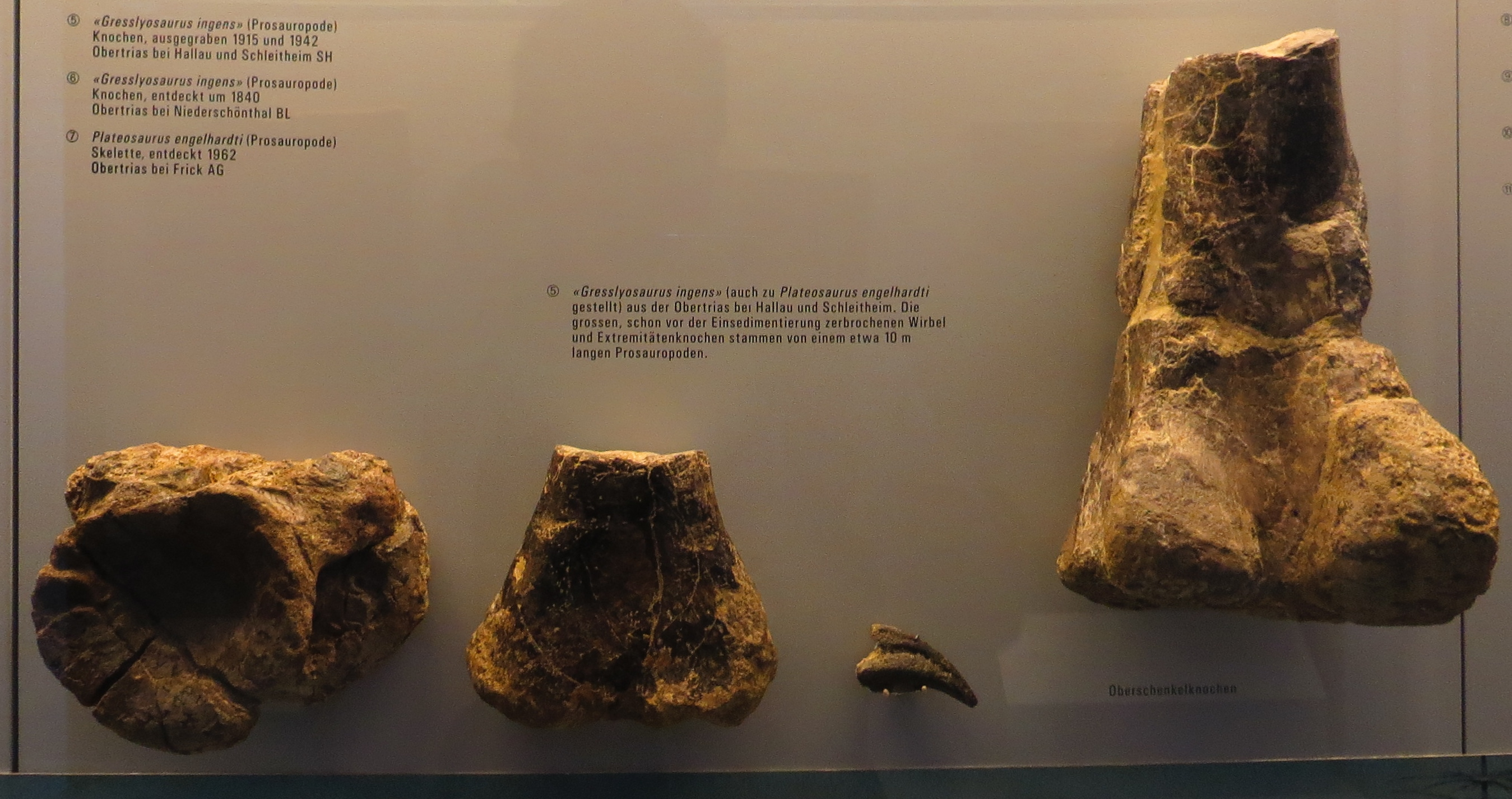
Gresslyosaurus

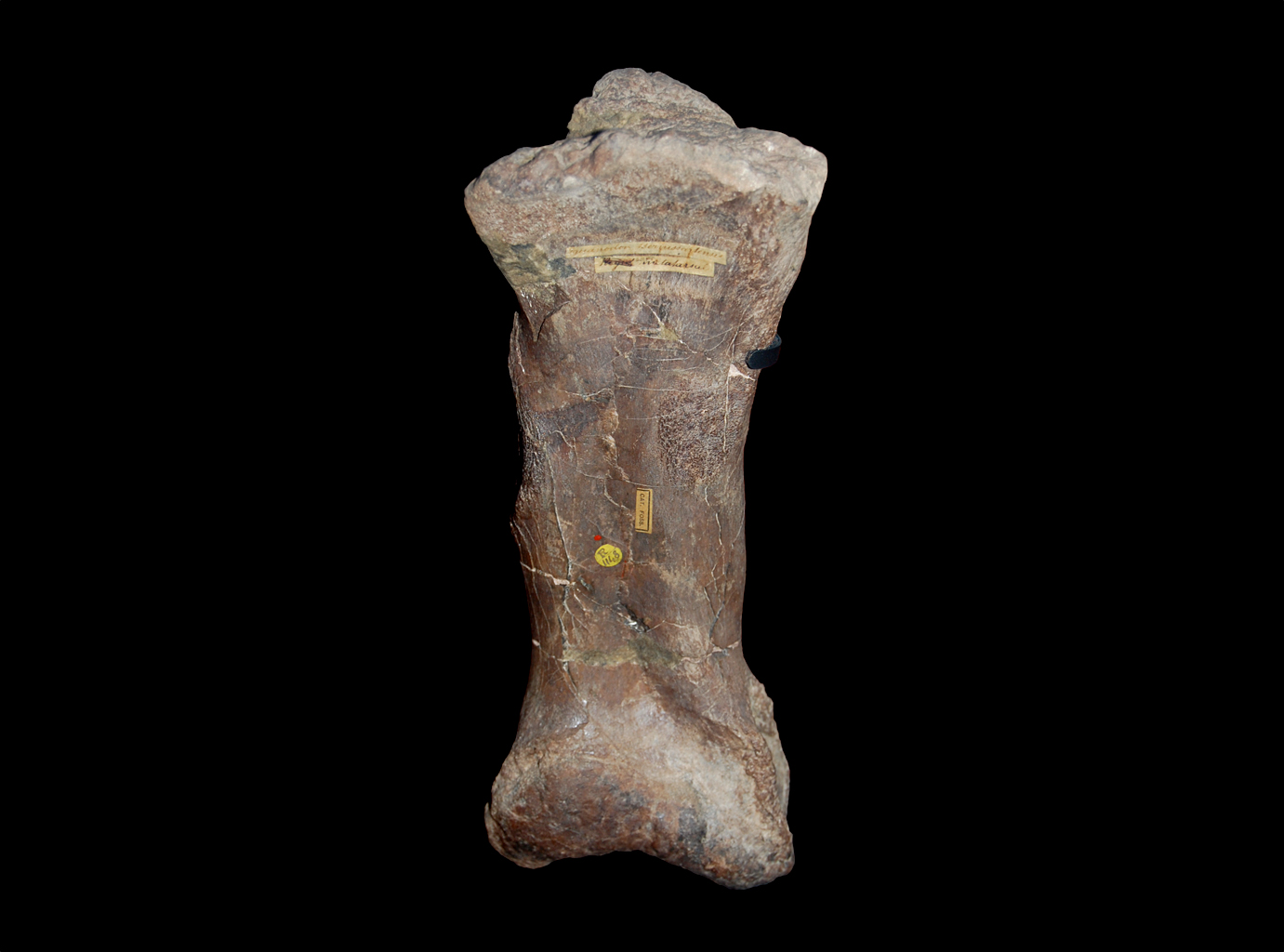
Huxleysaurus

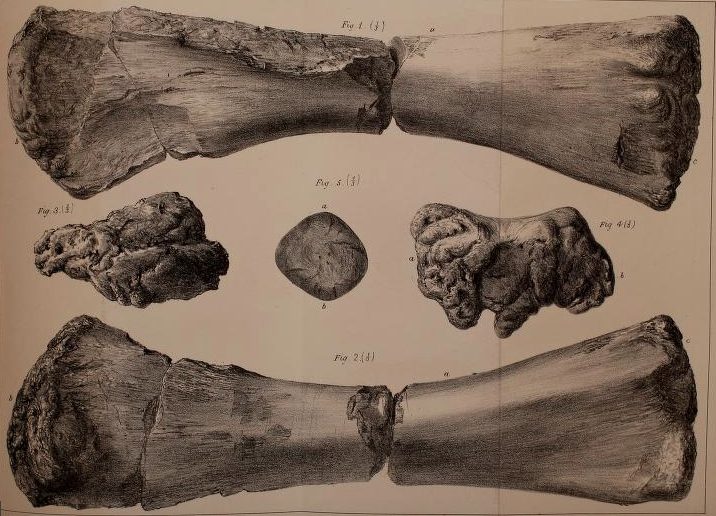
"Ischyrosaurus"

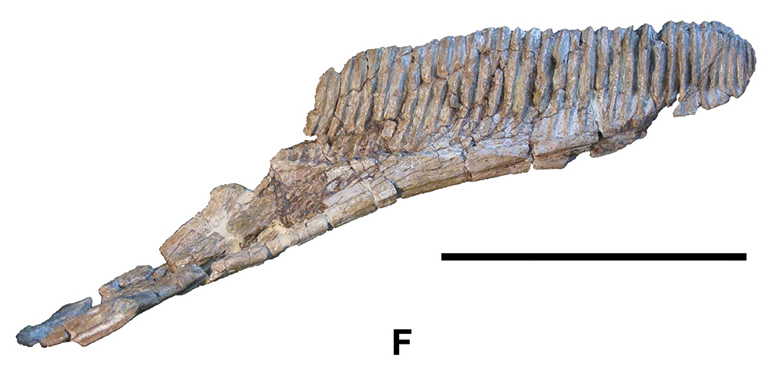
Koutalisaurus

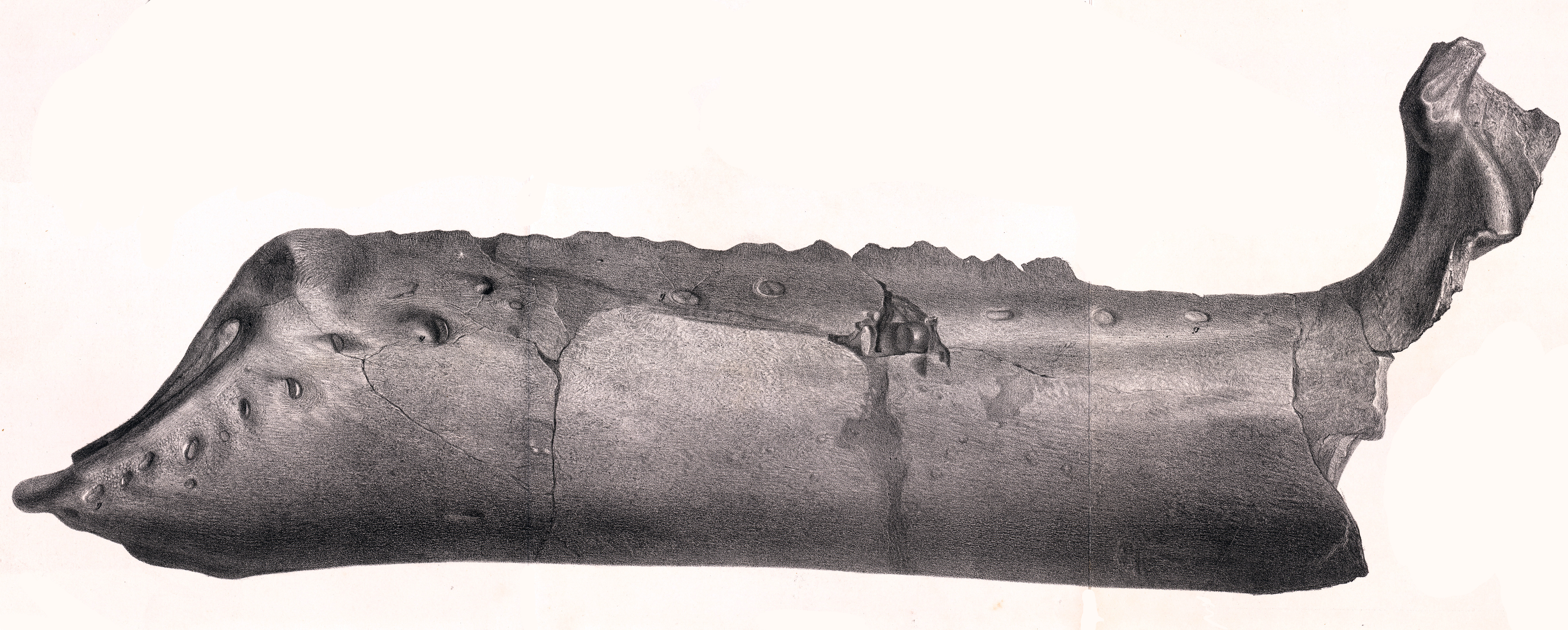
Kukufeldia

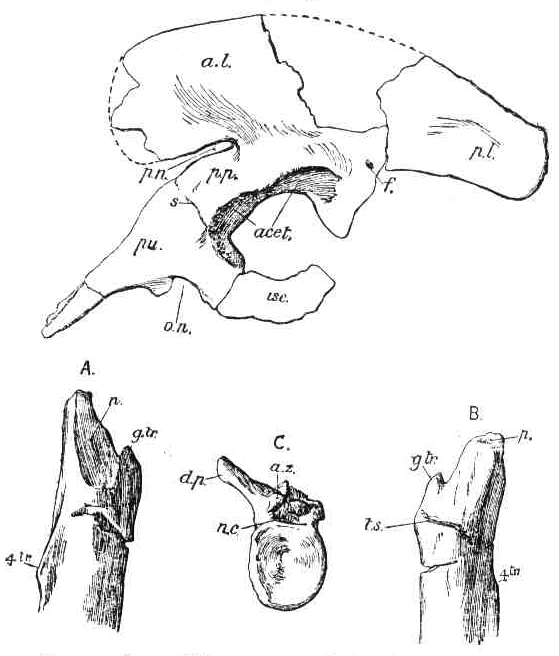
"Liassaurus"

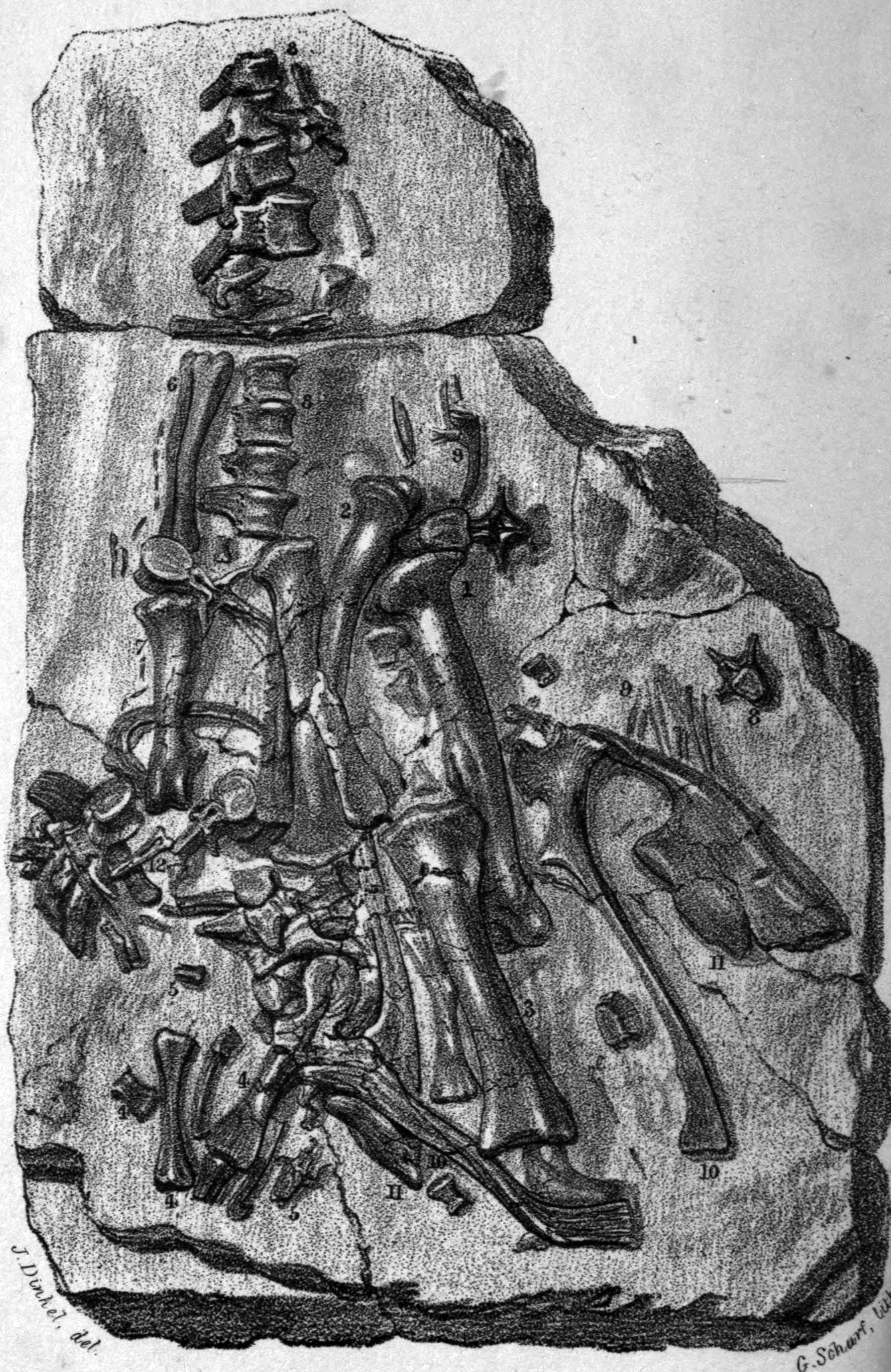
Mantellodon

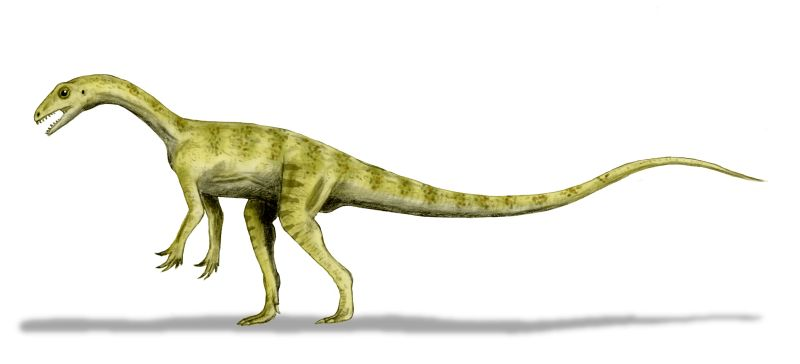
Pantydraco

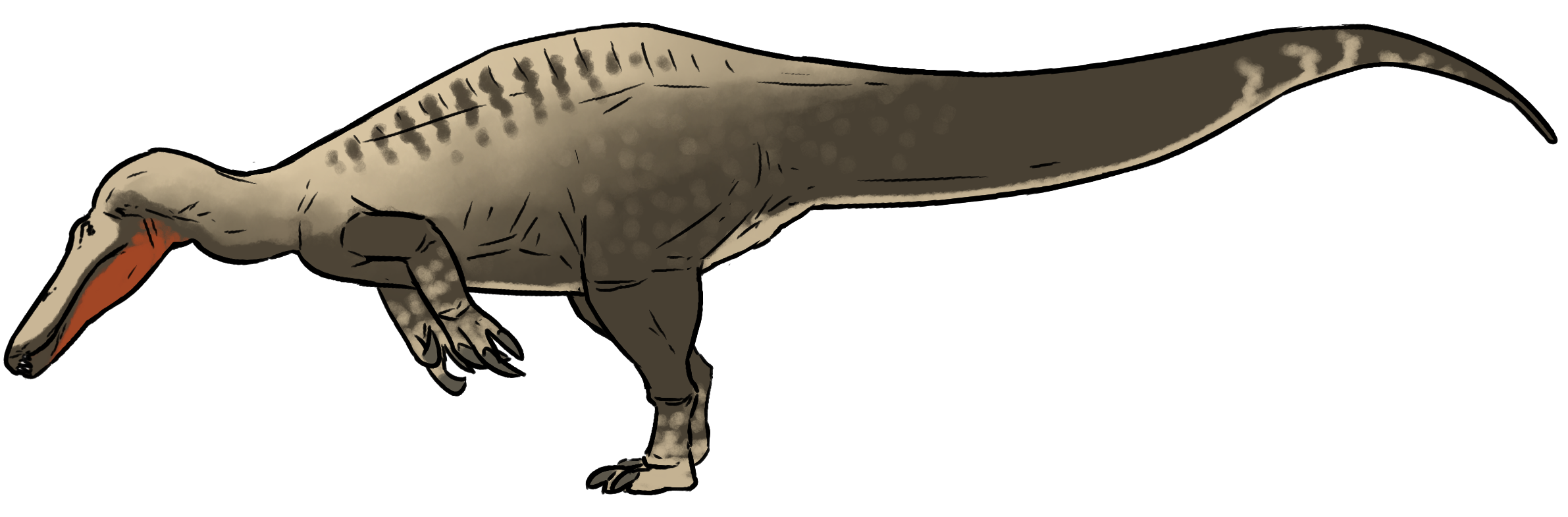
Suchosaurus

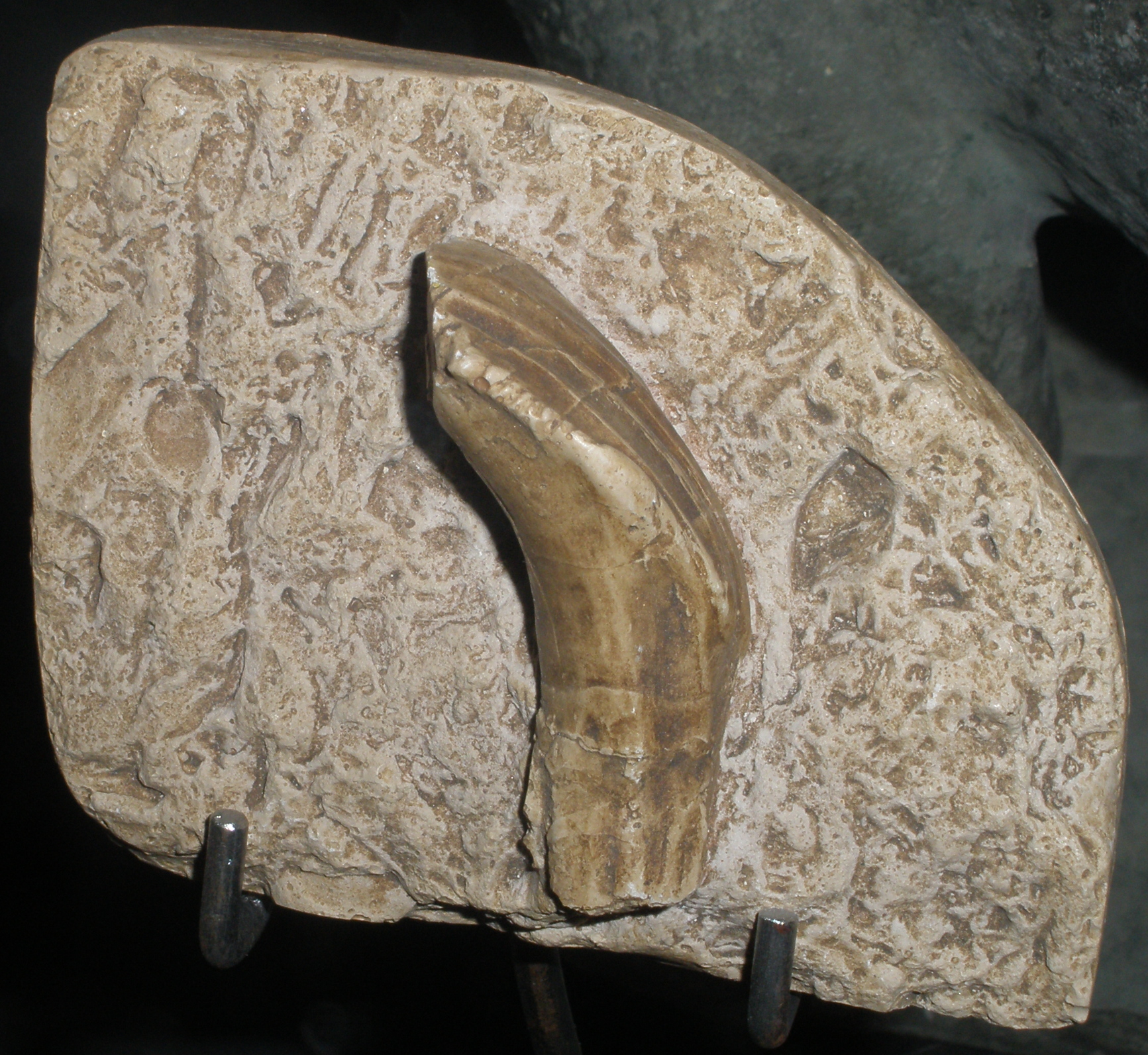
Therosaurus

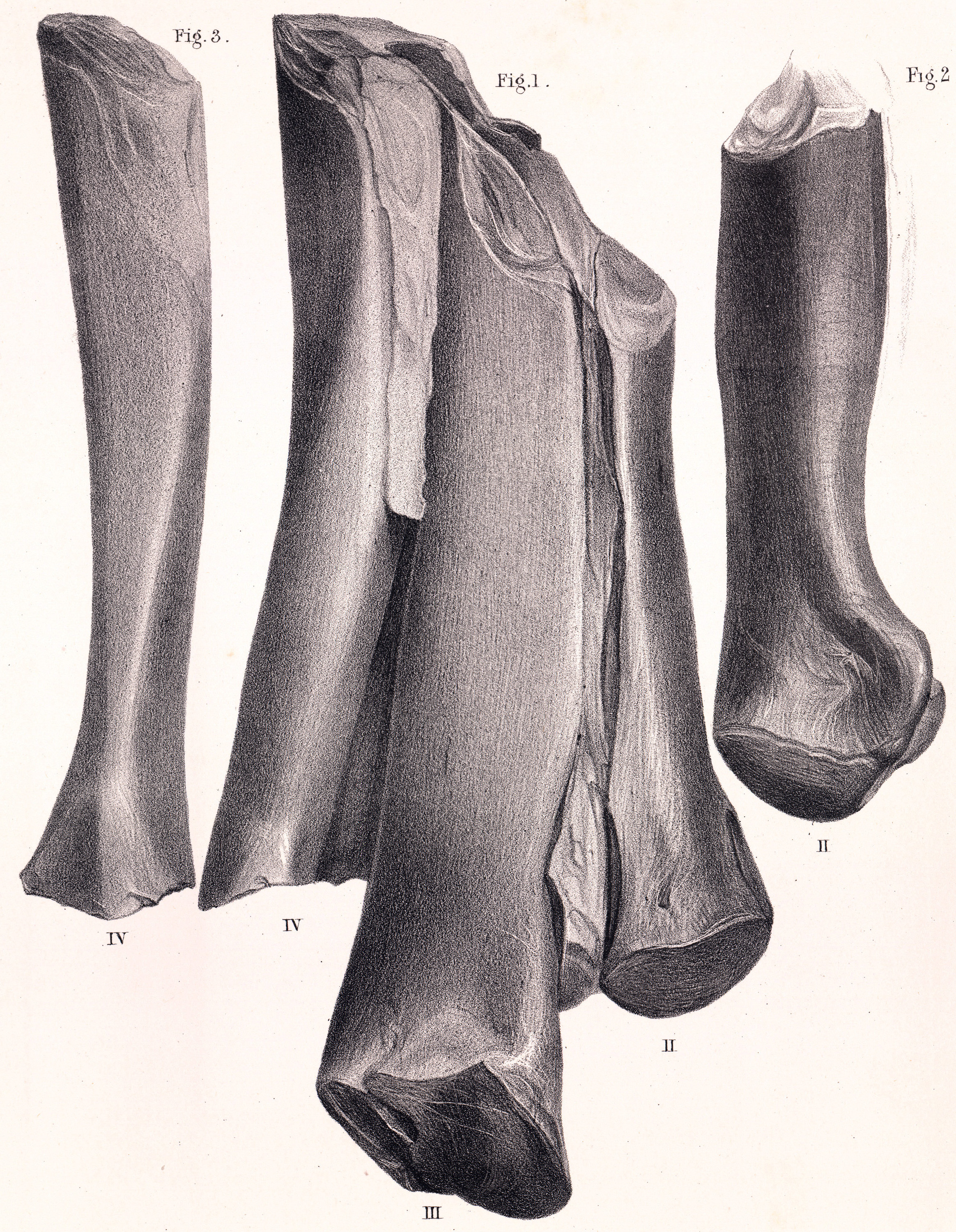
Valdoraptor

Wellnhoferia

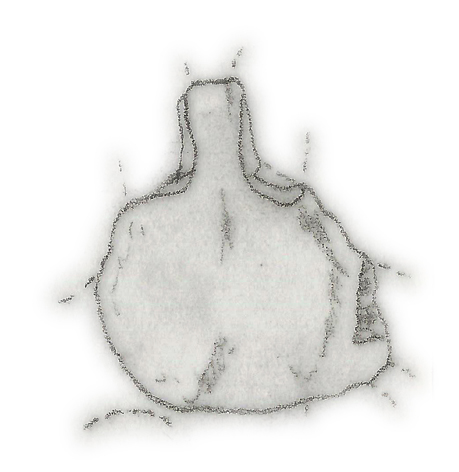
Yaverlandia
- Agrosaurus macgillivrayi: Originally mistakenly thought to be from Australia. It is now thought to be more likely from England and possibly a synonym of Thecodontosaurus.
- Archaeopteryx: A well-known taxon that combines bird-like pennaceous feathers with the teeth, claws and long tail of reptiles. It is usually considered a basal avialan but it might also be a non-avian deinonychosaur closely related to dromaeosaurids.
- Balaur bondoc: A strange paravian that possessed a suite of unique features, such as robust muscles, two sickle claws, a didactyl manus and a deep gut. It may have been an island-dwelling herbivore or omnivore. Studies show it either as a dromaeosaurid (possibly a velociraptorine or unenlagiine) or a basal avialan. It may be a synonym of Elopteryx.
- "Bihariosaurus bauxiticus": Although sometimes presented as a valid taxon, it is actually a nomen nudum.
- Ceratosaurus: Some specimens, mostly teeth, from Portugal and Switzerland have been assigned to this genus, but not to a specific species.
- Darwinsaurus evolutionis: May be a synonym of either Hypselospinus or Mantellisaurus.
- Delapparentia turolensis: Said to be a junior synonym of Iguanodon, but a 2026 study regarded it to be distinct from that genus, being more closely related to Magnamanus.
- Dinheirosaurus lourinhanensis: Possibly a second species of Supersaurus.
- Elopteryx nopcsai: Has been placed in different maniraptoran groups throughout history. A recent study suggests an avialan position for the taxon based on new fossil material.
- Gresslyosaurus: Often thought to be synonymous with Plateosaurus, although several differences between them have been noted.
- Huxleysaurus hollingtoniensis: Potentially a synonym of Hypselospinus.
- "Ischyrosaurus": The generic name Ischyrosaurus is preoccupied. The dinosaur may be a synonym of Ornithopsis.
- Koutalisaurus kohlerorum: Usually seen as a synonym of Pararhabdodon, but it could also be its own taxon.
- Kukufeldia tilgatensis: May be a synonym of Barilium.
- "Liassaurus huenei": Could potentially be a second specimen of Sarcosaurus.
- Lusitanosaurus liasicus: Although originally described as an early thyreophoran, later research has questioned this assignment and considered it a non-dinosaurian archosauromorph.
- Mantellodon carpenteri: Known from a single specimen from Maidstone affectionally nicknamed a "Mantell-piece". While originally thought to be a specimen of Iguanodon, it may in fact be a synonym of Mantellisaurus.
- Oligosaurus adelus: May be synonymous with Mochlodon.
- Ornithomerus gracilis: May be synonymous with Mochlodon.
- Pachysauriscus ajax: Usually seen as a synonym of Plateosaurus, but a 2023 review considered it distinct.
- Pantydraco caducus: Originally named as a species of Thecodontosaurus and indeed it may belong to that genus.
- Polacanthoides ponderosus: Potentially a synonym of Hylaeosaurus, Polacanthus or both (a chimera).
- Proplanicoxa galtoni: May be a junior synonym of Mantellisaurus.
- Rhadinosaurus alcimus: Suggested to be synonymous with Struthiosaurus, but it might have been a crocodilian instead.
- Sellacoxa pauli: Possibly synonymous with Barilium.
- Stegosaurus: Some bones from Portugal have been assigned to this genus, but not to a particular species.
- Suchosaurus: Two species have been named, both from teeth. They are indistinguishable from those of baryonychines and may in fact belong to Baryonyx.
- Taveirosaurus costai: Only known from teeth. Initially thought to be an ornithischian but it might be a eutriconodont mammal instead.
- Therosaurus: This genus was named to accommodate the original type species of Iguanodon, I. anglicus. However, it was named before the type species was transferred to I. bernissartensis, so it remains a junior synonym of Iguanodon.
- Valdoraptor oweni: Potentially a junior synonym of Thecocoelurus.
- Wellnhoferia grandis: May be another specimen of Archaeopteryx.
- Yaverlandia bitholus: Originally believed to be a pachycephalosaur on account of its domed forehead, but later reexamination found it to be a maniraptoran. A second specimen described in 2026 showed that it also has similarities with crocodyliforms.

== Timeline ==
This is a timeline of selected dinosaurs from the list above. Time is measured in Ma, megaannum, along the x-axis.

== See also ==
- Category: Cretaceous paleontological sites of Europe
- List of European birds
- List of dinosaur finds in the United Kingdom
