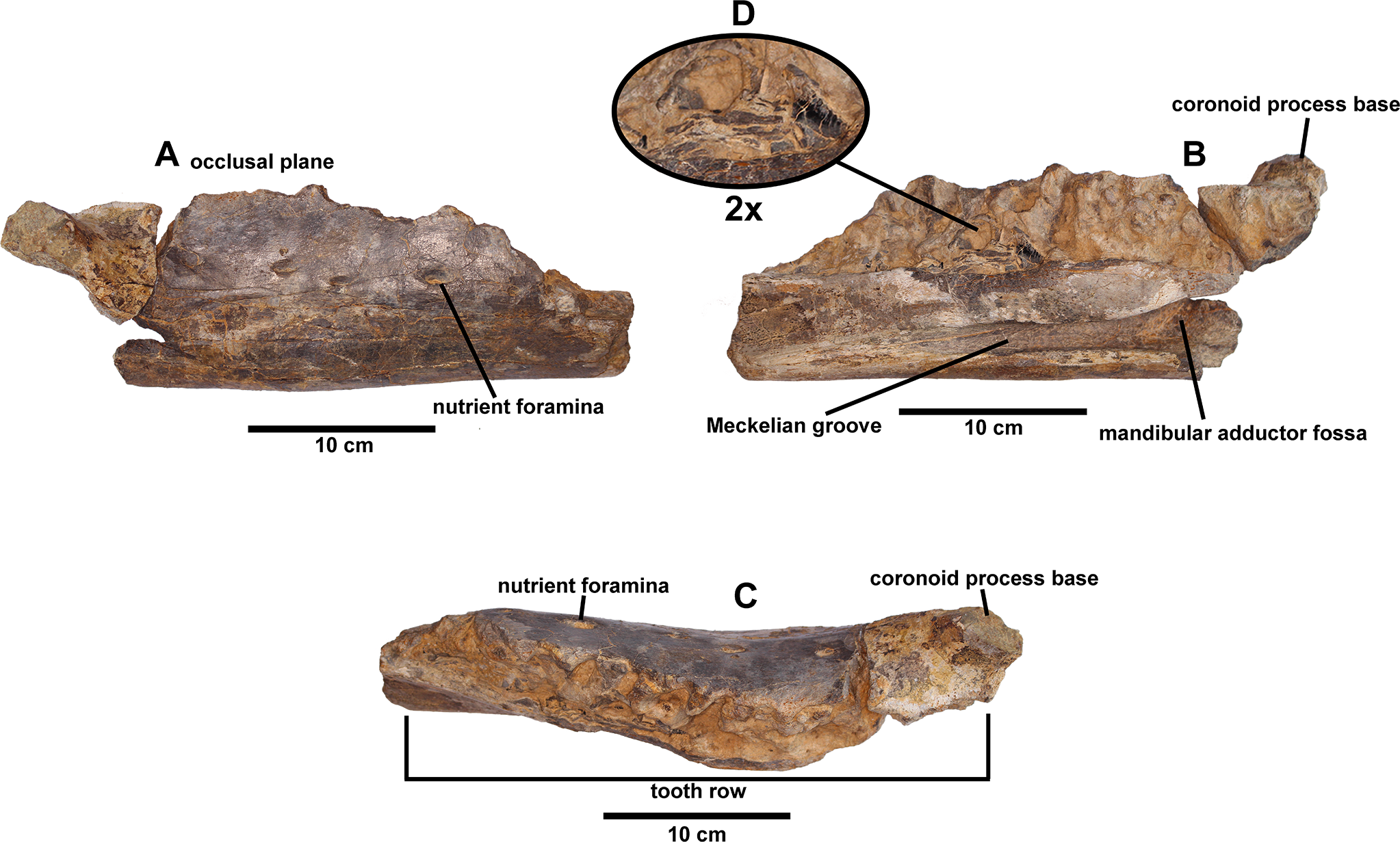
- Holotype dentary

Scientific classification
- Kingdom: Animalia
- Phylum: Chordata
- Class: Reptilia
- Clade: Dinosauria
- Clade: †Ornithischia
- Clade: †Ornithopoda
- Clade: †Hadrosauriformes
- Superfamily: †Hadrosauroidea
- Genus: †Portellsaurus; Santos-Cubedo et al., 2021
- Species: †P. sosbaynati

Binomial name
- †Portellsaurus sosbaynati Santos-Cubedo et al., 2021

= Portellsaurus =

Portellsaurus Temporal range: Barremian, 130–129 Ma

Extinct genus of dinosaurs

Portellsaurus (meaning "Portell Lizard") is a genus of hadrosauroid dinosaur from the Lower Cretaceous Margas de Mirambell Formation of Spain. The genus contains a single species, Portellsaurus sosbaynati, known from a partial right dentary.

== Discovery and naming ==
Portellsaurus was discovered in 1998 by Miquel Guardiola, Julián Yuste and Silvia Fabregat in a site near Mas de Curolles. The generic name, Portellsaurus, comes from the Portell de Morella, the town where the holotype was recovered, and the specific name, sosbaynati, refers to Vicente Sos Baynat, a Spanish geologist who was the first scientist honored by Universitat Jaume I as "Doctor Honoris Causa".

== Description ==
Portellsaurus is known from an almost complete right dentary, MQ98-II-1, which is stored at the Colección Museográfica de Cinctorres in Castellón.

Portellsaurus can be distinguished from other styracosternans through the possession of two unique features: the absence of a bulge along the ventral margin directly below the base of the coronoid process, convergently found in Altirhinus and Sirindhorna, and the presence of a deep oval cavity on the middle of the lower jaw's adductor fossa below the eleventh-twelfth tooth position. This cavity internally connects with the last nutrient foramina in the dentary.

== Classification ==
Santos-Cubedo et al. performed a phylogenetic analysis based on the dataset used in the redescription of Iguanodon galvensis and recovered Portellsaurus as a derived non-hadrosauromorph hadrosauroid. Below is the 50% majority consensus tree from the analysis:

- Ankylopollexia
  - - Camptosaurus
    - Cumnoria
  - Styracosterna
    - - Draconyx
      - Uteodon
    - - Magnamanus
      - Owenodon
      - - Cedrorestes
        - Dakotadon
        - Iguanacolossus
        - Hadrosauriformes
          - Barilium
          - Fukuisaurus
          - - Iguanodon
            - Hadrosauroidea
              - - Hypselospinus
                - - Mantellisaurus
                  - Morelladon
              - - - Portellsaurus
                  - - Bolong
                    - Ouranosaurus
                - - Equijubus
                  - - Probactrosaurus
                    - Hadrosauromorpha
