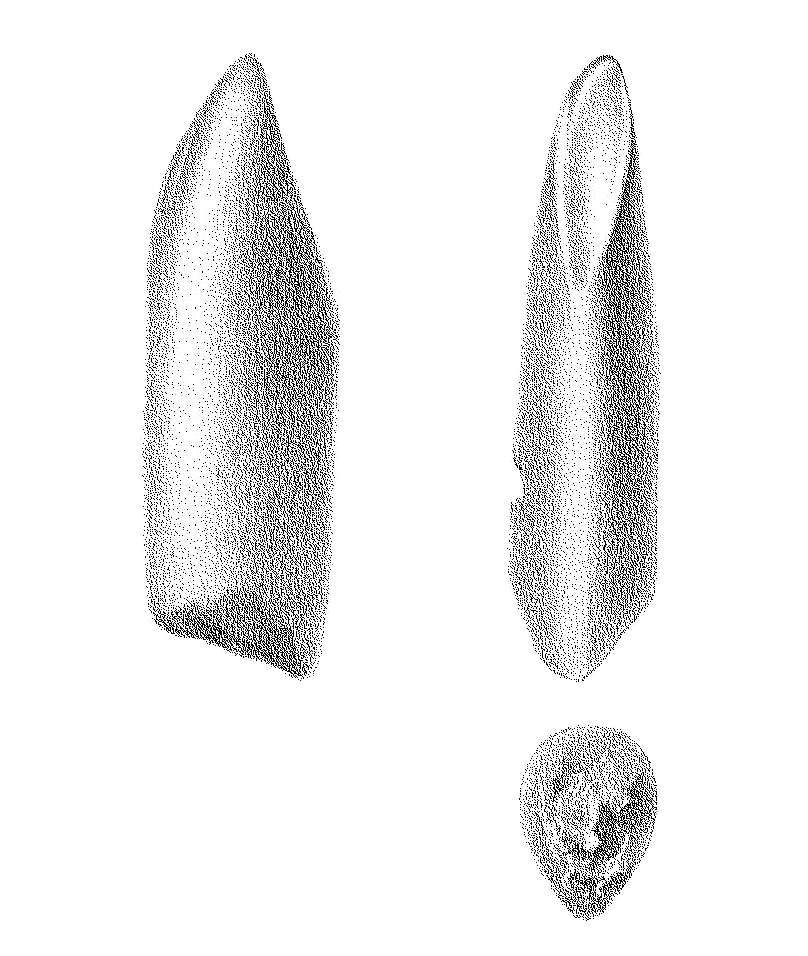
- Holotype tooth

Scientific classification
- Kingdom: Animalia
- Phylum: Chordata
- Class: Reptilia
- Clade: Dinosauria
- Clade: Saurischia
- Clade: †Sauropodomorpha
- Clade: †Sauropoda
- Family: †incertae sedis
- Genus: †Morinosaurus; H. E.Sauvage, 1874
- Species: †M. typus

Binomial name
- †Morinosaurus typus H. E. Sauvage, 1874

= Morinosaurus =

Morinosaurus Temporal range: Late Jurassic, Kimmeridgian

Extinct genus of dinosaurs

Morinosaurus (meaning "Morini lizard", for an ancient people of northern France) is a genus of sauropod dinosaur from an unnamed formation of Kimmeridgian-aged (Late Jurassic) rocks from Boulogne-sur-Mer, Département du Pas-de-Calais, France. It is an obscure tooth genus sometimes referred to the Early Cretaceous English wastebasket taxon Pelorosaurus.

== History and taxonomy ==
The French paleontologist H. E. Sauvage based this genus on a single worn tooth, apparently now lost, which he compared to those of Hypselosaurus. Oddly, despite illustrations of the tooth, and the implications of comparing it to a titanosaur with narrow-crowned teeth, it was included as a synonym of Pelorosaurus in two major reviews. Pelorosaurus, being a putative brachiosaurid, is assumed to have had broad-crowned teeth.

Age, however, was not an issue, because it was referred to the possible Pelorosaurus species P. manseli (="Ischyrosaurus"), which was also from the Upper Jurassic (the question of whether "Ischyrosaurus" or any Jurassic species should be included in Pelorosaurus at all is another issue). The most recent review considers it to be a nomen dubium without further comment.

Sauvage also suggested that a partial right humerus belonged to the type individual.

== Paleobiology ==
Morinosaurus would have been a large, quadrupedal herbivore. Having titanosaur-like teeth may suggest more titanosaurian- or diplodocoid-like feeding habits, but this is speculative. The tooth crown was 50 mm (1.97 im) tall and had a cross-section of 16 by 12 mm (0.63 by 0.47 in).
