= List of dinosaur finds in the United Kingdom =

This is a partial list of dinosaur finds in the United Kingdom, arranged by genus alphabetically.

== List of dinosaurs ==
Genus	Picture	Period	Discovery locations and dates
Acanthopholis		Cretaceous (late)	Folkestone, Kent in c. 1865 Gault, Kent in 2000
Altispinax		Cretaceous (early)	Battle, East Sussex in 1856
Anoplosaurus		Cretaceous (early)	Cambridgeshire, no later than 1878
Aristosuchus		Cretaceous (early)	Isle of Wight no later than 1876
Asylosaurus		Triassic (late)	Avon Fissure Fill, Bristol in 1834
Barilium		Cretaceous (early)	St Leonards-on-Sea, Sussex between 1880 and 1888
Baryonyx		Cretaceous (early)	Smokejacks Brickworks, Waverley, Surrey in 1983 Ewhurst Brickworks, Walliswood, Surrey in 1997 Redlands Bricks, Bexhill-on-Sea, East Sussex in 1997 Ashdown Brickworks, Bexhill-on-Sea, East Sussex in 2010
Bothriospondylus		Jurassic (middle)	Wiltshire no later than 1875
Brighstoneus		Cretaceous (early)	Grange Chine, Isle of Wight in 1978
Calamosaurus		Cretaceous (early)	Isle of Wight no later than 1889
Calamospondylus		Cretaceous (early)	Isle of Wight in 1865, 1866 and 2014
Callovosaurus		Jurassic (middle)	Fletton, Cambridgeshire in 1889
Camelotia		Triassic (late)	Westbury-on-Severn, Glastonbury no later than 1985
Camptosaurus		Jurassic (late)	Chawley Brick Pits, Cumnor Hurst, Oxfordshire in 1880
Cardiodon		Jurassic (late)	Bradford-upon-Avon, Wiltshire no later than 1844 Cirencester, Gloucestershire no later than 1890
Ceratosuchops		Cretaceous (early)	Chilton Chine, Isle of Wight between 2013 and 2017
Cetiosauriscus		Jurassic (mid)	New Peterborough Brick Company, Fletton, Cambridgeshire in 1898
Cetiosaurus		Jurassic (mid)	19 sites including: Stonesfield, Oxfordshire in 1825 Staple-Hill, Wootton, Oxfordshire in 1841 Sarsden, Chipping Norton, Oxfordshire in 1888
Chondrosteosaurus		Cretaceous (early)	Brighstone or Brook, Isle of Wight no later than 1876
Craterosaurus		Cretaceous (early)	Potton, Bedfordshire no later than 1874
Cruxicheiros		Jurassic (middle)	Little Compton, Warwickshire in 1960s
Cryptosaurus		Jurassic (late)	Great Gransden, Cambridgeshire in c. 1869
Cumnoria		Jurassic (late)	Chawley Brick Pits, Cumnor Hurst, Oxfordshire in 1879
Dacentrurus		Jurassic (late)	Swindon Brick and Tile Company, Swindon, Wiltshire in 1874
Dinodocus		Cretaceous (early)	Hythe, Kent in 1840
Dracoraptor		Jurassic (early)	Penarth, Wales in 2014
Duriatitan		Jurassic (late)	Sandsfoot, Weymouth, Dorset no later than 1874
Duriavenator		Jurassic (middle)	Sherborne, Dorset in c. 1882
Echinodon		Cretaceous (early)	Durdlestone Bay, Isle of Portland in c. 1861
Eotyrannus		Cretaceous (early)	Isle of Wight in 1995
Eucamerotus		Cretaceous (early)	Brighstone, Isle of Wight no later than 1872
Eucercosaurus		Cretaceous (early)	Trumpington, Cambridgeshire no later than 1879
Eustreptospondylus		Jurassic (mid)	Summertown Pit, Wolvercote, Oxfordshire in 1870
Gigantosaurus		Jurassic (late)	Cottenham, Cambridgeshire in 1862 Ely, Cambridgeshire in 1862 Stretham, Cambridgeshire in 1862
Haestasaurus		Cretaceous (early)	Unknown location near Hastings, East Sussex in 1852
Horshamosaurus		Cretaceous (early)	Rudgwick Brickworks Company, Rudgwick, West Sussex in 1985
Hylaeosaurus		Cretaceous (early)	Tilgate Forest, Cuckfield, West Sussex in 1822 Stammerham Quarry, Horsham, West Sussex in 1826 Hakesbourne Pit, Rusper, West Sussex in 1842 Bolney, West Sussex in 1851 Ridgeway Hill, Weymouth, Dorset in 1860 Brixton Bay, Isle of Wight in 1874 Ashdown Brickworks, Bexhill-on-Sea, East Sussex in 2010
Hypselospinus		Cretaceous (early)	Shornden, East Sussex in 1886
Hypsilophodon		Cretaceous (early)	Cowleaze Chine, Isle of Wight in 1849 Isle of Wight in 1979
Iguanodon		Cretaceous (early)	Over 60 sites including: First discovery (tooth) at Tilgate Forest, Cuckfield, West Sussex in 1822
Iliosuchus		Jurassic (middle)	Stonesfield, Oxfordshire in 1880
Istiorachis		Cretaceous (early)	Compton Bay, Isle of Wight in 2013
Iuticosaurus		Cretaceous (early)	Brook, Isle of Wight no later than 1887
Juratyrant		Jurassic (late)	Dorset in 1984
Mantellisaurus		Cretaceous (early)	Rockhill Quarry, Maidstone in 1834 Atherfield, Isle of Wight in 1917 Smokejacks Brickworks, Waverley, Surrey in 1956 Chilton Chine, Isle of Wight in 1976 Grange Cline, Isle of Wight in 1989
Megalosaurus		Jurassic (mid)	Over 30 sites including: Tooth at Caswell, Oxfordshire in the 17th century, lower femur at Stonesfield, Oxfordshire in 1676 and over 100 further bones found there from at least 7 individuals by 1911
Metriacanthosaurus		Jurassic (late)	Jordan's Cliff, Weymouth, Dorset in 1871
Neovenator		Cretaceous (early)	Brighstone Bay, Isle of Wight in 1978
Nuthetes		Cretaceous (early)	Durlston Bay, near Swanage, Isle of Purbeck, Dorset sometime before 1854 when it was described by Richard Owen
Owenodon		Cretaceous (early)	Durlston Bay, Dorset in 1860
Pantydraco		Jurassic (early)	Pant-y-ffynnon Quarry, Bonvilston, Vale of Glamorgan in 1952
Pelorosaurus		Cretaceous (early)	Cuckfield Quarry, West Sussex in 1822 Upware, Cambridgeshire in 1883
Polacanthus		Cretaceous (early)	12 sites (9 on Isle of Wight, 2 in Sussex, 1 in Essex) including: First discovery (partial skeleton) at Barnes High, Isle of Wight in 1865 Another partial skeleton at Barnes High in 1979
Proceratosaurus		Jurassic (mid)	Minchinhampton, Gloucestershire in 1910
Riparovenator		Cretaceous (early)	Chilton Chine, Isle of Wight between 2013 and 2017
Saltopus		Triassic (late)	Partial skeleton at Lossiemouth Quarries, Elgin, Moray in 1867
Sarcosaurus		Jurassic (early)	Partial skeleton at Barrow-on-Soar, Leicestershire in 1921 Wilmcote, Warwickshire in 1908 and in 2004
Scelidosaurus		Jurassic (early)	Partial skeletons at Charmouth, Lyme Regis, Dorset in 1850s, in 1955 and in 1985 Seatown, Dorset in 1987
Thecodontosaurus		Triassic (late)	Durdham Down, Bristol in 1834 Microlestes Quarry, Frome, Somerset in 1871 Holwell, Frome, Somerset in 1889 Ruthin Quarry, Glamorgan in 1957 Tytherington Quarry, Gloucestershire in 1970s
Valdosaurus		Cretaceous (early)	Tilgate Forest, Cuckfield, West Sussex in 1822 Hakesbourne Pit, Rusper, West Sussex in 1842 Cowleaze Chine, Isle of Wight in 1855 Heathfield, East Sussex in 1975 Isle of Wight in 2001 Horsham, West Sussex in 2009 Langhurstwood Quarry, Warnham, West Sussex in 2011
Vectipelta		Cretaceous (early)	Isle of Wight in 1993

== Timeline ==
This is a timeline for these dinosaurs during the Mesozoic era. Time is measured in millions of years. Red for carnivores, blue for omnivores, green for herbivores.

== See also ==
- Dinosaurs of the Isle of Wight
- List of European dinosaurs
