= Gres de Saint-Chinian =

Grès de Saint-Chinian
- Stratigraphic range: Late Campanian - Early Maastrichtian
- Type: Geological formation

Location
- Region: Europe
- Country: France

The Grès de Saint-Chinian is a geological formation in Aude and Hérault, France whose strata date back to the Late Cretaceous. Dinosaur remains are among the fossils that have been recovered from the formation.

== Vertebrate paleofauna ==
Grès de Saint-Chinian outcrops in Département de L'Herault have produced dinosaur eggs, along with the indeterminate remains of avialans, enantiornithes, and possible indeterminate abelisaurids.

Dinosaurs of the Gres de Saint-Chinian
Genus	Species	Location	Stratigraphic position	Abundance	Notes	Images
Ampelosaurus	A. atacis	Département de L'Herault				Ampelosaurus Rhabdodon Variraptor
Rhabdodon	Rhabdodon cf. priscus	Département de L'Aude				Ampelosaurus Rhabdodon Variraptor
Rhodanosaurus	R. lugdunensis	Département de L'Herault			Actually indeterminate Ankylosauria remains.	Ampelosaurus Rhabdodon Variraptor
Megalosaurus	M. pannoniensis	Département de L'Herault				Ampelosaurus Rhabdodon Variraptor
Variraptor	V. mechinorum	Département de L'Herault; Département de L'Aude				Ampelosaurus Rhabdodon Variraptor

== See also ==
- List of dinosaur-bearing rock formations
