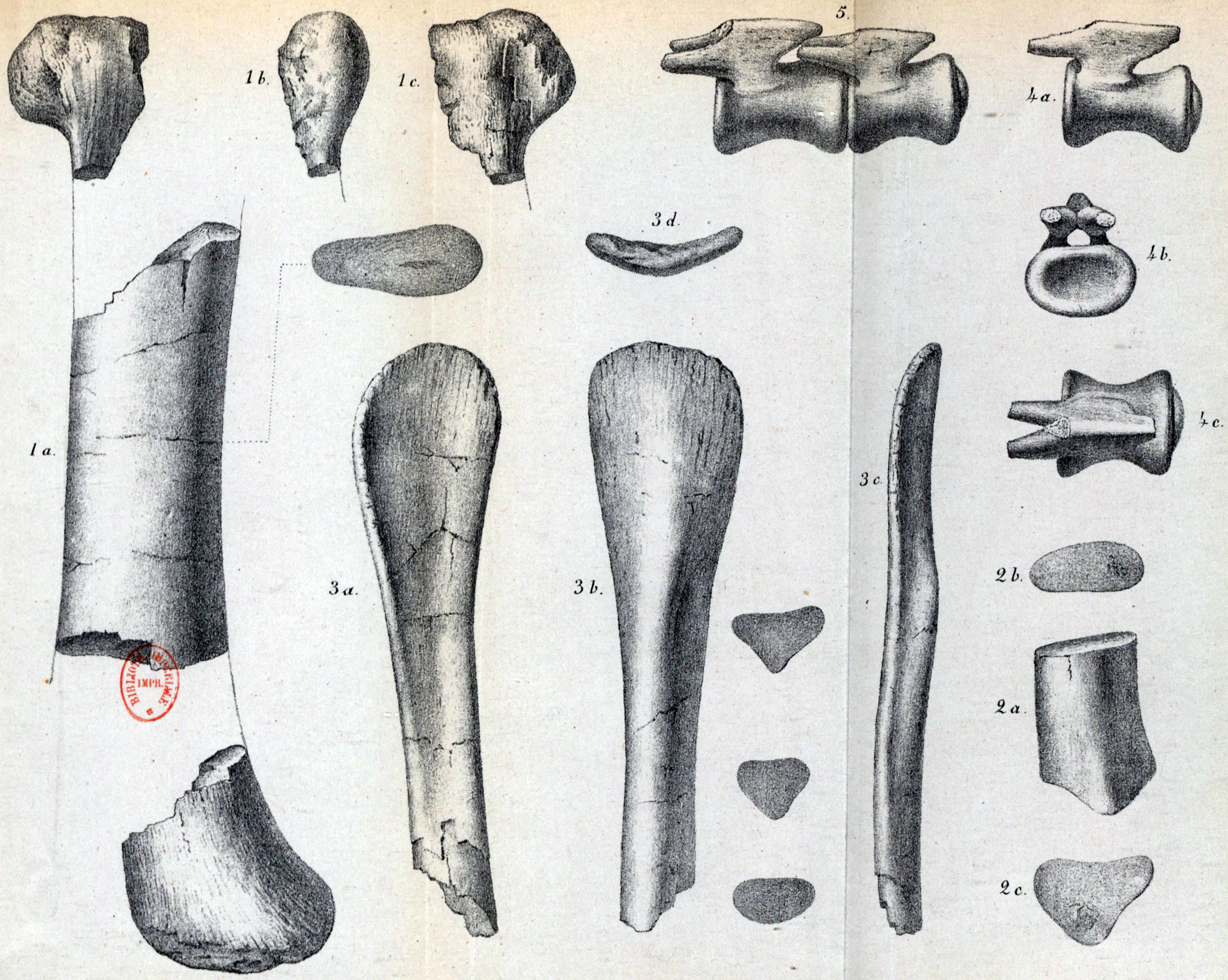
- Holotype material including femur, tibia, fibula and vertebrae

Scientific classification
- Kingdom: Animalia
- Phylum: Chordata
- Class: Reptilia
- Clade: Dinosauria
- Clade: Saurischia
- Clade: †Sauropodomorpha
- Clade: †Sauropoda
- Clade: †Macronaria
- Clade: †Titanosauria
- Genus: †Hypselosaurus; Matheron, 1869
- Species: †H. priscus

Binomial name
- †Hypselosaurus priscus Matheron, 1869

= Hypselosaurus =

Hypselosaurus Temporal range: Late Cretaceous, 70 Ma

Extinct genus of reptiles

Hypselosaurus (meaning 'highest lizard', from Greek ὑψηλός meaning 'high' or 'lofty' and σαυρος meaning 'lizard') is a dubious genus of titanosaurian sauropod that lived in southern France during the Late Cretaceous, approximately 70 million years ago in the early Maastrichtian. Hypselosaurus was first described in 1846, but was not formally named until 1869, when Phillip Matheron named it under the binomial Hypselosaurus priscus. The holotype specimen includes a partial hindlimb and a pair of caudal vertebrae, and two eggshell fragments were found alongside these bones. Because of the proximity of these eggshells to the fossil remains, many later authors, including Matheron and Paul Gervais, have assigned several eggs from the same region of France all to Hypselosaurus, although the variation and differences between these eggs suggest that they do not all belong to the same taxon. Hypselosaurus has been found in the same formation as the dromaeosaurids Variraptor and Pyroraptor, the ornithopod Rhabdodon, and the ankylosaurian Rhodanosaurus, as well as indeterminate bones from other groups.

== Discovery ==
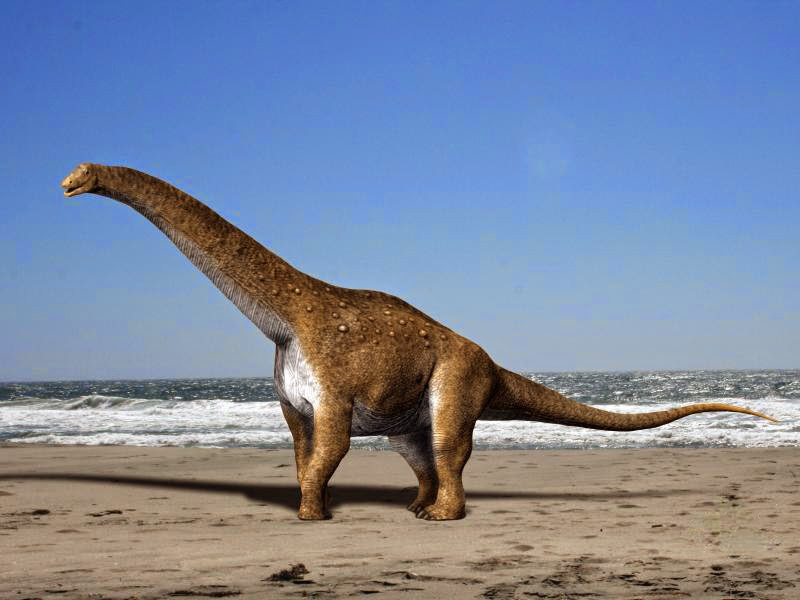
Restoration

In 1846, Pierre Philippe Émile Matheron, a French geologist and paleontologist, described several large bones from Provence, France. In the spring of 1869, Matheron formally described these remains, including a partial femur, fibula and possible tibia and a pair of associated caudal vertebrae, as the holotype specimen of a new taxon, Hypselosaurus priscus. Among the bones, portions of the femur shaft are not preserved, along with a majority of the tibia, while both the fibula and vertebrae are entirely preserved. The layer the fossils came from is likely from the late Late Cretaceous, specifically 70 million years ago.

Since its original description, several specimens have been referred to Hypselosaurus. One of these, originally described in 1957 by Albert de Lapparent, includes a caudal vertebra, as well as another vertebra described in 1960 by Bataller. In 1993, a review of European sauropods stated that Hypselosaurus was a nomen dubium, and that its holotype could not be verifiably distinguished from other sauropods in the same, and many other, regions. Based on this, the material that was referred to Hypselosaurus by several other authors would have to be considered an intermediate titanosaur.

In addition to the holotype skeleton, Matheron described two fragments of a spherical or ellipsoid fossil in 1869. These fragments were studied for some time by Matheron and his contemporary French paleontologists, and the only probable conclusion was that they were fragments of eggshells. The eggs were proposed to have been significantly larger than those of Aepyornis when complete, and Matheron suggested that they either were a very large bird egg, or belonged to Hypselosaurus.

When originally named, Matheron proposed that Hypselosaurus was an aquatic crocodile, as was suggested for similar taxa like Pelorosaurus, Cetiosaurus, Streptospondylus and Steneosaurus by their describers. Matheron noted that the long bones, particularly the femur, lacked medullary bone, and thus proposed that it could not have been terrestrial like Iguanodon.

The discoveries of new material from the Rognac area of France has led to the suggestion that Hypselosaurus may be the same taxon as Atsinganosaurus, which requires further material with overlap to confirm or deny.

== Description ==
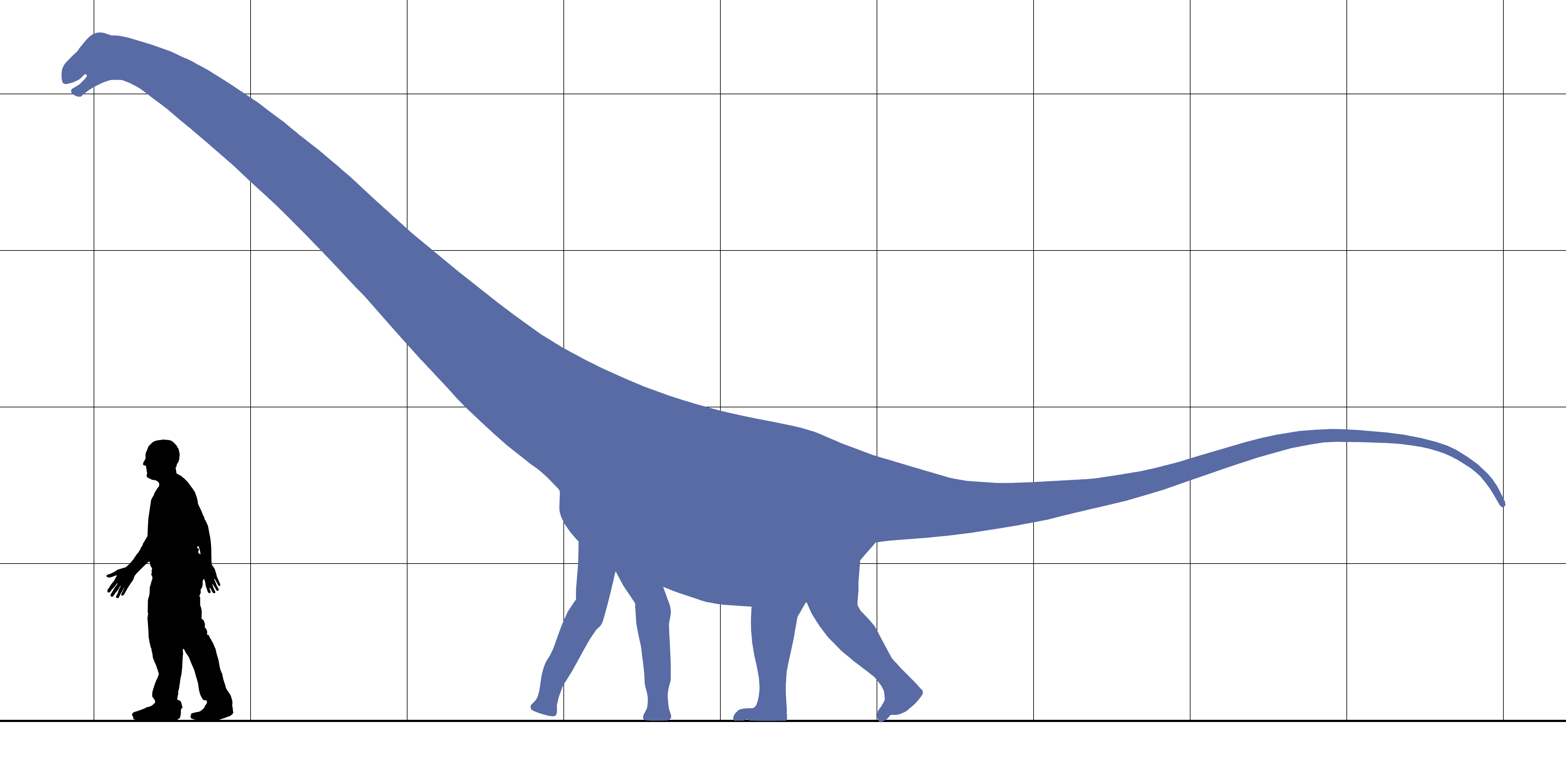
Scale diagram

Hypselosaurus was a proposed to be 15 m (49 ft) in length, when it was considered a crocodilian, which would have made it one of the largest of the group. However, a modern estimate as a titanosaur has put Hypselosaurus at around 12.0 m (39.4 ft), with a very rough weight estimate of 7.3–14.5 t (8–16 short tons). One of the smaller titanosaurs, Neuquensaurus, measures only 7.5 m (25 ft) long.

=== Limb bones ===
The left femur of Hypselosaurus, at 80 cm (31 in) in length, is quite eroded, with both the femoral head and the distal condyles being eroded and distorted by sediment. The femur is slightly sinuous, and narrows antero-posteriorly, becoming a subquadrangular oval 17 cm (6.7 in) wide and only 7 cm (2.8 in) long. The internal shaft is fairly spongey, although the internal bone is only loosely attached, and the femur clearly lacks a medullary canal.

As preserved, the left tibia is largely incomplete, with only a small section of the shaft, just proximal to the distal condyles, known. Like the femur, there is no medullary canal present, and the spongey internal bone is asymmetrically dense. Few other features can be identified, among those the dimensions and cross-section of the bone. The tibia is ovoid in cross-section, with the anterior diameter 11 cm (4.3 in) long, and 5.5 cm (2.2 in) wide.

The fibula, at 55 cm (22 in) in length, corresponds well with the size of the femur and tibia. The fibula is approximately an equilateral triangle in cross-section, with the inner face slightly concave and outer face convex. The flatter surface of the fibula is 18 cm (7.1 in) wide, and opposite ridge protrudes 7 cm (2.8 in) from this.

=== Vertebrae ===
Two caudal vertebrae were preserved, although there would have been a much larger number in the tail. Both bones are nearly identical in every feature, but the anterior has is slightly larger dimensions. The vertebrae are not compressed laterally, instead being compressed vertically to a width of 11 cm (4.3 in) and a height of 7 cm (2.8 in) in the posterior vertebra. Both vertebrae are procoelous, with the anterior articular face being concave, and the posterior face being convex. The larger vertebra is 12 cm (4.7 in) at its widest, but it narrows towards the middle of its length until it is only 8 cm (3.1 in) wide. Both vertebrae preserved the zygapophyses, articular processes that connect the consecutive vertebrae. The vertebrae are overall very similar to those of Pelorosaurus

== Palaeobiology ==
=== Eggs ===
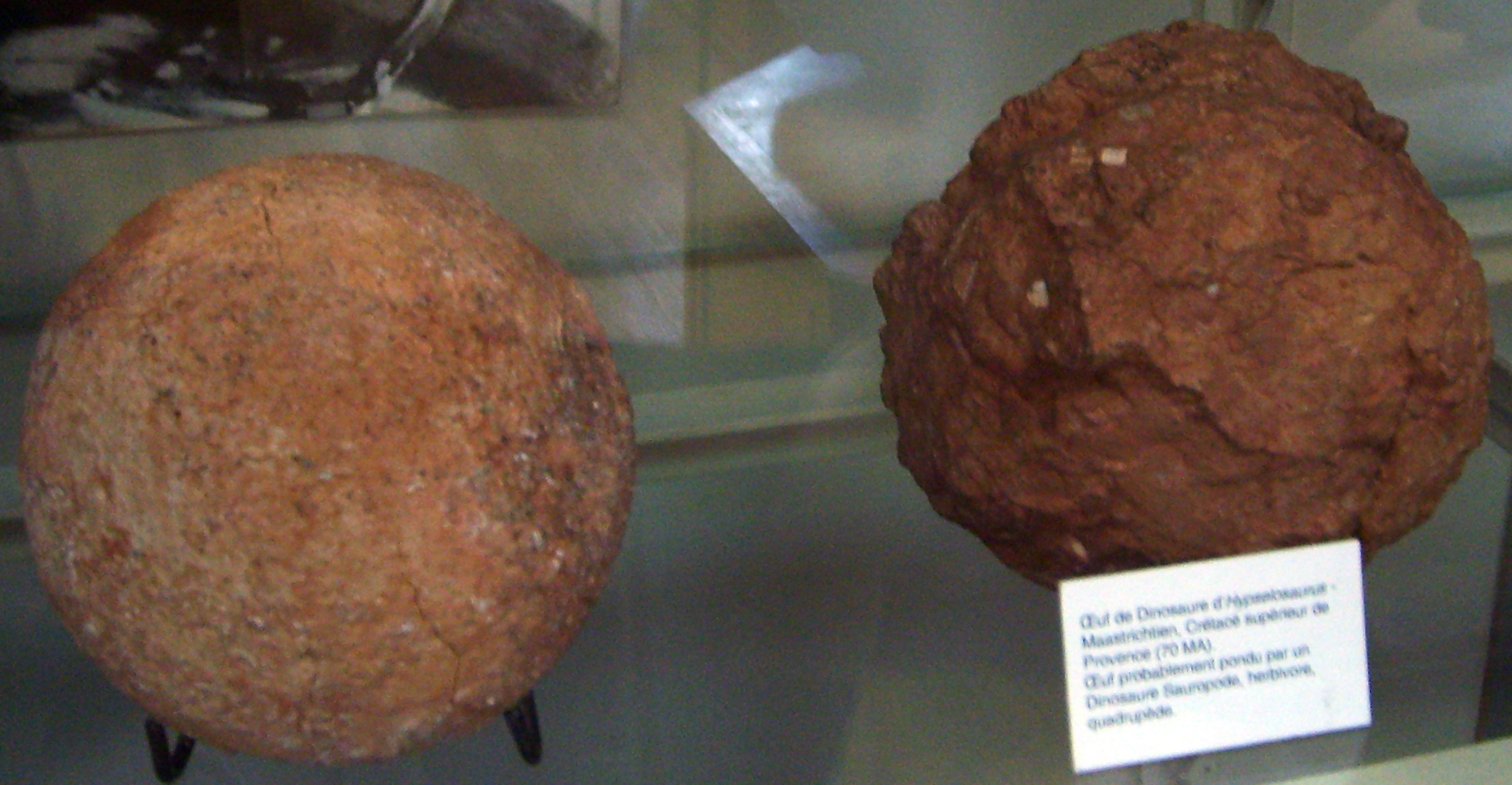
Referred eggs at the National Museum of Natural History, France

Eggs attributed to Hypselosaurus by Matheron and Paul Gervais have been found in France since 1846, and were the earliest dinosaur eggs actually discovered, although they were not recognized as being dinosaurian for several decades. The eggs are unusually large; measuring at around 1-foot (0.30 m) in length. Age determination studies performed on the fossilized remains have been inconclusive, with results ranging from a few decades to several hundred years.

Eggs with abnormally thin shells have been attributed to Hypselosaurus priscus. Some experts have speculated that this was the cause of the species' extinction, with vegetation changes, climatic change and overcrowding being the original impetus for the shell thinning. However, there are alternative explanations for the thin eggshell not dependent on pathology. Later researchers found evidence that the eggs in question successfully hatched. Some researchers postulated that the thinner "Hypselosaurus priscus" eggshells came from different taxa than the thicker eggshells, and subsequent researchers have come to support this idea. Another potential explanation for variation in eggshell thickness is that the thinner eggs were laid by younger individuals than the thicker shell eggs laid by older individuals or that it was a consequence of natural variations of eggshell thickness within a single species.

Most Hypselosaurus egg are in collections and museums in France, but an egg is on display in the Life on Earth gallery at Leeds City Museum, United Kingdom, and a rock slab with twelve eggs is on display at the Museum of Evolution in Knuthenborg Safaripark, Denmark.

=== Ecology ===
Hypselosaurus has been found only in the Grès à Reptiles Formation, in the Provence region of southern France. This formation, dating to the early Maastrichtian approximately 70 mya, has provided fossils of several different groups of dinosaurs. The theropods Variraptor and Pyroraptor, both considered to be within the family Dromaeosauridae, have been found in the Grés á Reptiles Formation, in addition to the nodosaurid ankylosaurian Rhodanosaurus (a dubious genus); a bone fragment potentially belonging to Abelisauridae; and the rhabdodontid ornithopod Rhabdodon. Although the material between Variraptor and Pyroraptor cannot be compared, and they may in fact belong to the same taxon, there are at least two separate dromarosaurids present in the formation. In addition, a new titanosaur, Atsinganosaurus was described from the formation, based on several dorsal vertebrae. There are also indeterminate crocodilians known from the same strata as Hypselosaurus, although they are only represented by unnamed fragments.
