= Magnamanus =

Magnamanus Temporal range: Early Cretaceous, ~130 Ma

Scientific classification
- Kingdom: Animalia
- Phylum: Chordata
- Class: Reptilia
- Clade: Dinosauria
- Clade: †Ornithischia
- Clade: †Ornithopoda
- Family: †Iguanodontidae
- Genus: †Magnamanus; Vidarte et al., 2016

Type species
- †Magnamanus soriaensis Vidarte et al., 2016

Extinct genus of dinosaurs

Magnamanus is an extinct genus of herbivorous iguanodontian dinosaur that lived during the Early Cretaceous in what is now Spain in the Golmayo Formation. It contains a single species, Magnamanus soriaensis.

== Description ==
Magnamanus is a large ornithopod measuring 9–10 metres (30–33 ft) long and weighing around 3 metric tons (3.3 short tons)—a similar size to Iguanodon bernissartensis. The hand is broad and similar to other basal members of Iguanodontia, with a protruding thumb spine and a fifth finger.

The descriptors established nine distinctive features for this taxon, all autapomorphies. The dentary contributes to the front coronoid process of the lower jaw so that the last dentary tooth is located on the slope of the protrusion, instead of on the basis of it. The length of the shoulder amounts to six times the upper width, and seven times the minimum width. In the shoulder the front processus acromion is facing on the other side of the rear projection. When the humerus is the inner corner of the upper edge is not in the same plane as the outer bottom joint ball, which makes contact with the radius, and the outer bump is located above the level of the inner cusp which, for the ulna. In the ulna, the lower end is wider than the upper, and club-shaped. The lower end of the radius is clavate. The wrist consists of three elements, one of which is a fusion of the radial and intermedial, and the second is a fusion of the ulnar carpal, and the third and the third party is identical to the fifth carpal. The formula of the phalanges is 1-3-3-2- (3/4). The width of the wrist is 70% of the length of the hand. The processus praepubicus is straight without widening at the end or grooves, and in the base is not closed, the obturator foramen in the base and is half covered on the inside with a flat bone plate.

== Discovery and naming ==
In the early twenty-first century Carolina Fuentes and Manuel Meijide conducted excavations along with their children on the Zorralbo I site in the marshes of Golmayo, five kilometers west of Soria. Between 2000 and 2004 they dug up the skeleton of a euornithopod, one of the most complete skeletons of a dinosaur from the Lower Cretaceous of Spain that has been found.

In 2016 the type species Magnamanus soriaensis was named and described by Carolina Fuentes Vidarte, Manuel Calvo Meijide, Federico Meijide Fuentes and Manuel Fuentes Meijide. The genus name is a combination of the Latin word magnus "large" and manus, "hand", a reference to the big hands of the animal. The specific name refers to its origin in Soria.

The fossils, with catalogue numbers MNS 2000/132, 2001/122, 2002/95, 2003/69, 2004/54, were found in the Golmayo Formation which dates from the Hauterivian - Barremian, about 130 million years old. It consists of a partial skeleton with skull and lower jaws. Have been preserved: parts of the maxilla, a piece of premaxilla, a left dentary piece, a piece of the right surangular, pieces of the hyoid apparatus, loose edges of alveolar ridge, sixty two loose teeth from the upper jaw, thirty-six loose teeth from the lower jaw, a proatlas, a centrum of a cervical vertebra, a neck rib, four dorsal vertebrae, thirty-six pieces of the sacrum, thirty-two caudal vertebrae, six ribs, three complete chevrons, pieces of chevrons, ossified tendons, the right shoulder blade (scapula), both coracoids, both humeri, the right-hand radius, the left ulna, the right hand thumb, the right hand, a piece of left iliac, the processus praepubici of the two pubic bones, a piece of the right femur, a part of the right tibia, and the second and fourth metatarsals of the right leg. The bones are not found in association but were spread over an area of eight square meters. They were considered as belonging to a single individual, an old adult animal that is seen as the holotype. The holotype is now part of the collection of the Museo Numantino in Soria (NMS).

== Classification ==
Magnamanus is classified within the group Ankylopollexia in Styracosterna, placed in a rather basal position.

== See also ==
- 2016 in paleontology
