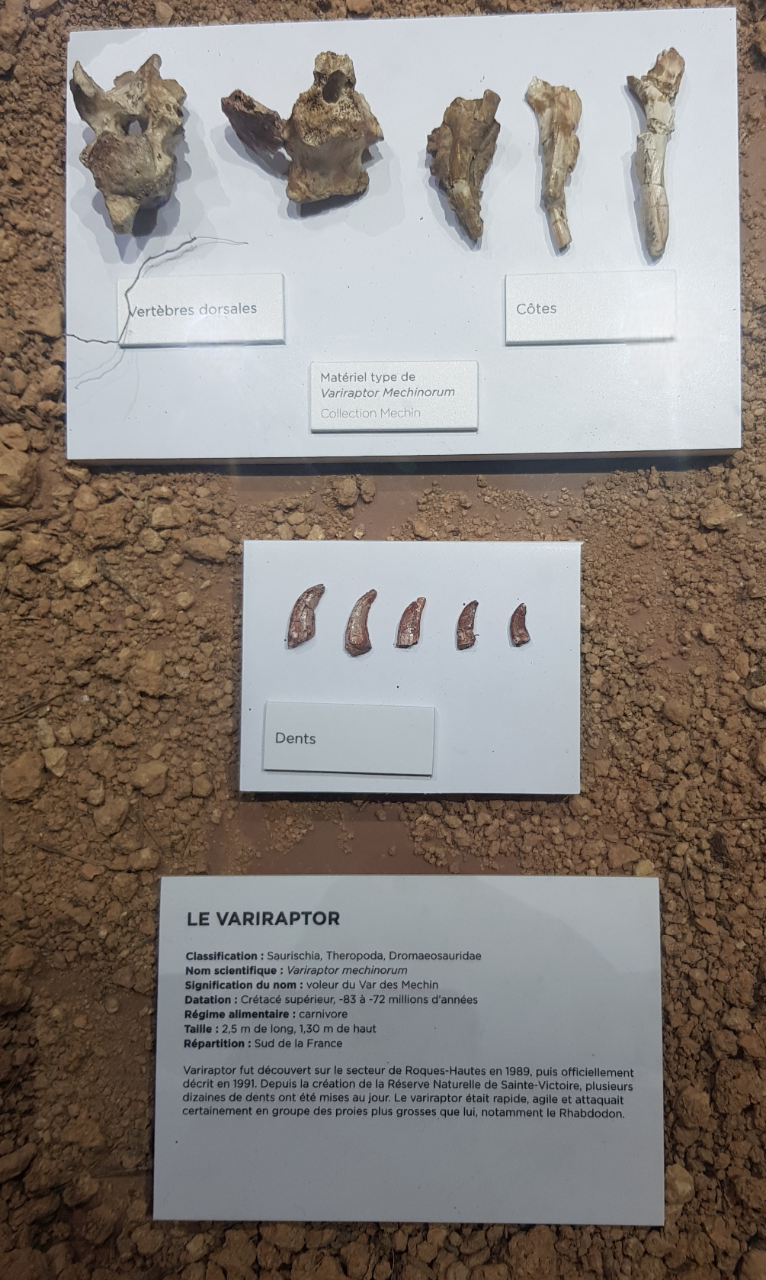
- Type material

Scientific classification
- Kingdom: Animalia
- Phylum: Chordata
- Class: Reptilia
- Clade: Dinosauria
- Clade: Saurischia
- Clade: Theropoda
- Family: †Dromaeosauridae
- Genus: †Variraptor; Le Loeuff & Buffetaut, 1998
- Species: †V. mechinorum

Binomial name
- †Variraptor mechinorum Le Loeuff & Buffetaut, 1998

= Variraptor =

Variraptor Temporal range: Campanian-Maastrichtian, 70 Ma

Dubious extinct genus of dinosaurs

Variraptor (/ˈværɪræptər/ VARR-i-rap-tor; "Var thief") is a potentially chimaeric genus of dromaeosaurid theropod dinosaur from the Late Cretaceous of France.

== Discovery ==
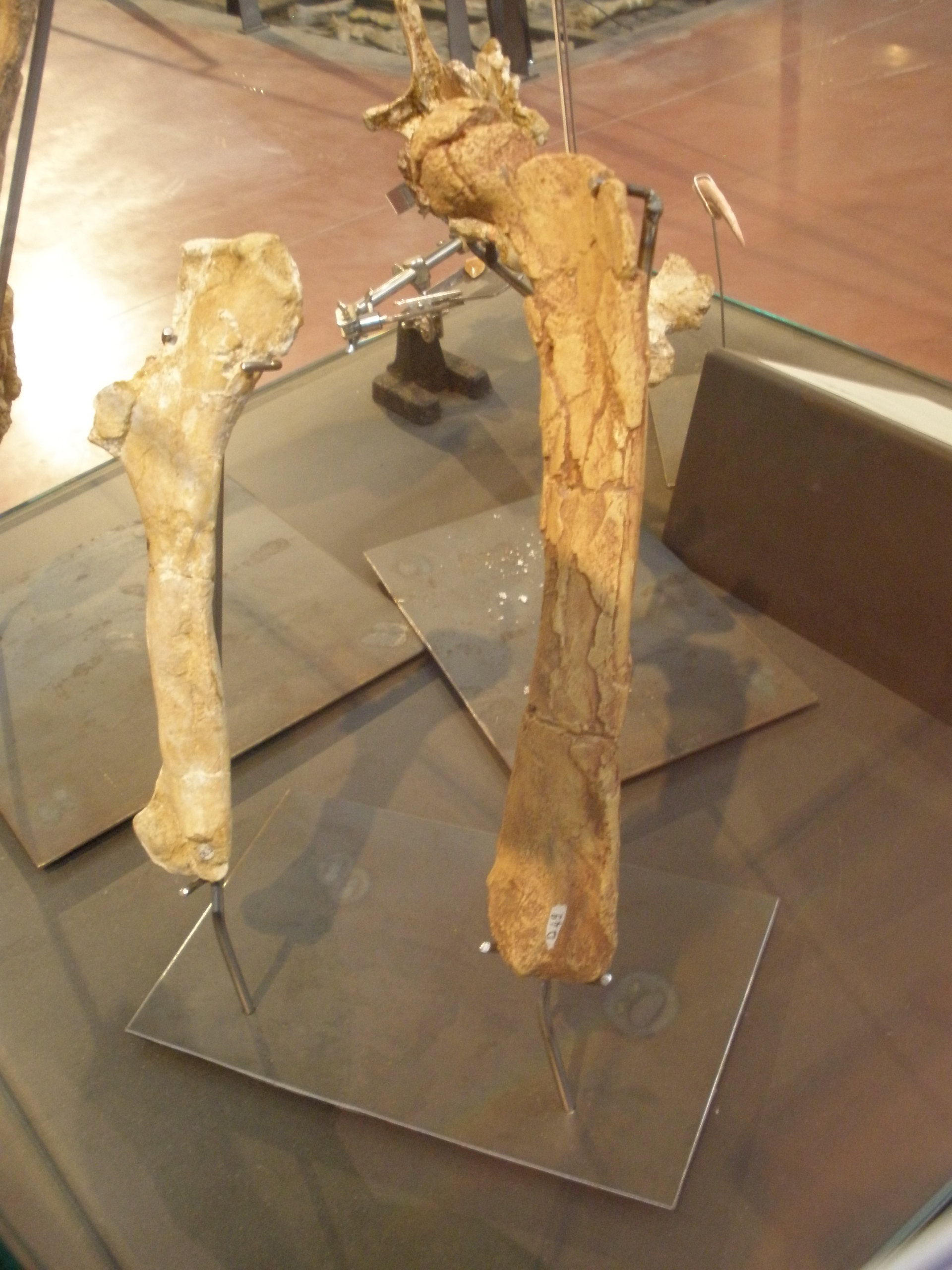
Possible Variraptor bones

Between 1992 and 1995, amateur paleontologists Patrick Méchin and Annie Méchin-Salessy uncovered the remains of a small theropod in the Grès à Reptiles Formation (Campanian-Maastrichtian) at La Bastide Neuve, near Fox-Amphoux. The first finds were in 1992 assigned to the theropod genus Elopteryx. A second article, in 1997, concluded they represented a new species. In 1998 this was named by Jean Le Loeuff and Eric Buffetaut as the type species Variraptor mechinorum. The generic name is derived from Latin Varus, referring to the Var River in the Alpes-Maritimes department in the Provence region of southern France, and raptor meaning "thief". The specific name honours the Méchin couple.

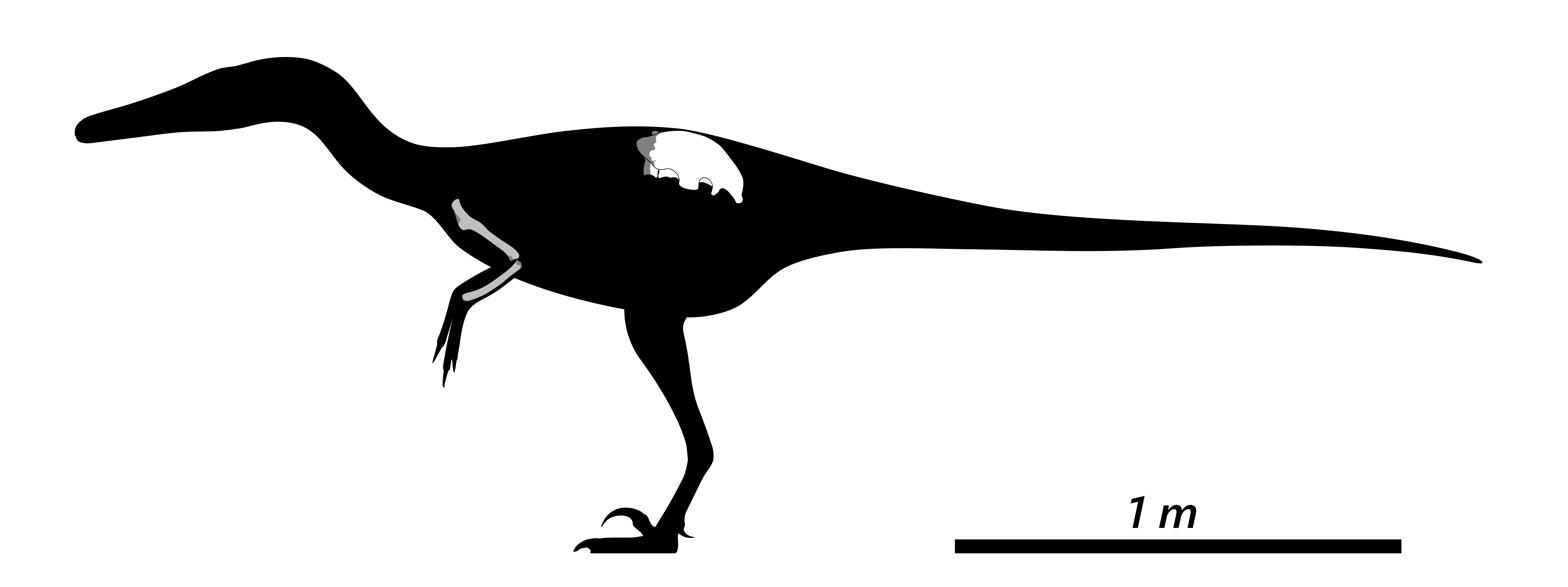
Hypothetical skeletal reconstruction as an unenlagiine

The genus is based on three type specimens: a posterior dorsal vertebra (MDE-D168), a sacrum (MDE-D169) with five fused vertebrae, and an ilium (CM-645). The specimens are part of the collection of the Musée des Dinosaures d'Espéraza and the private Collection Méchin. Additional referred material includes a right humerus (MDE-D158) with a well-developed deltopectoral crest, suggesting a raptorial function for the forearm. Other attributed bones include a femur and various vertebrae.

== Description ==
Size compared to a human

The incomplete remains have dromaeosaurid features in the shape of the vertebrae and the humerus, with some resemblances to Deinonychus.

== Classification ==
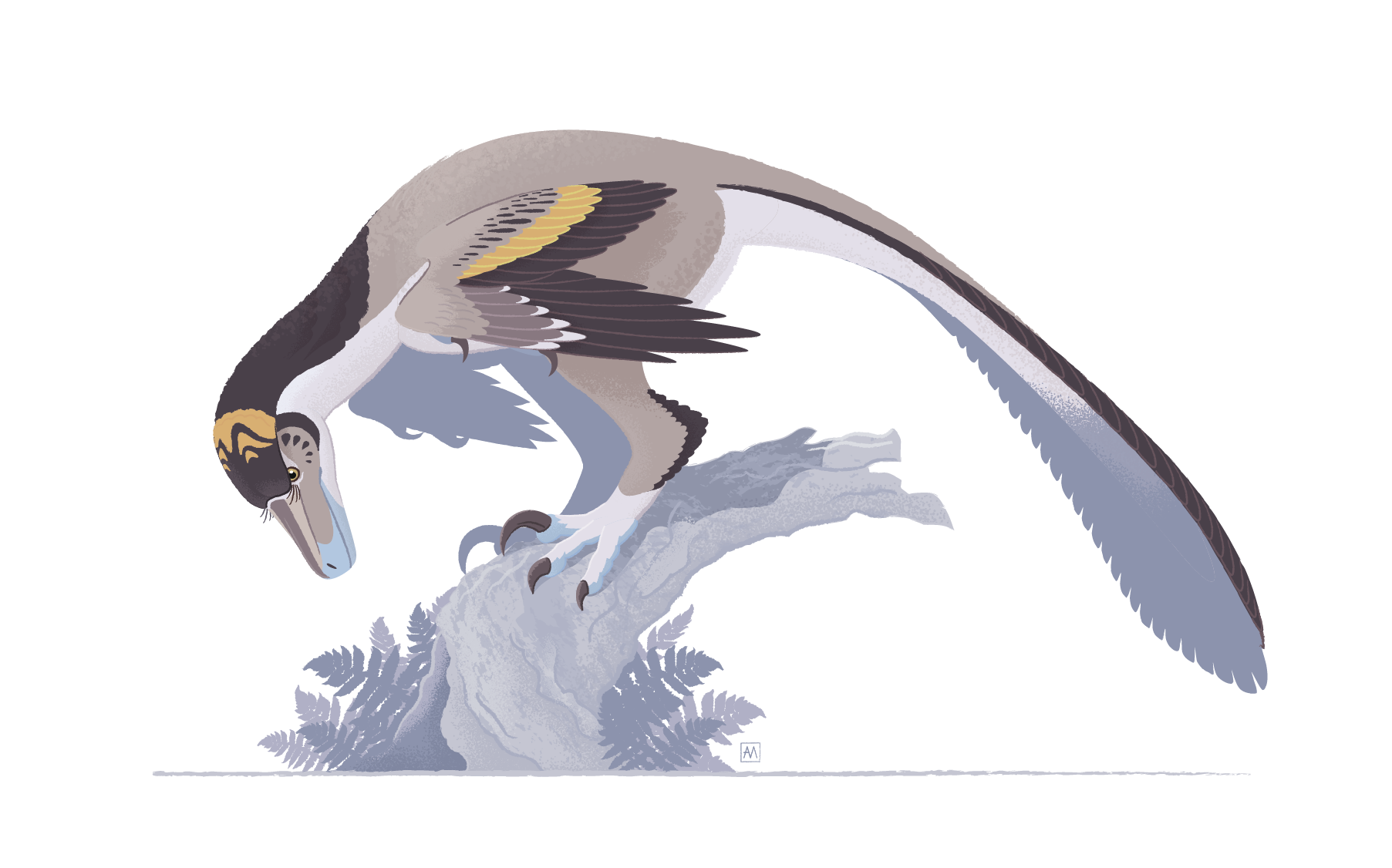
Life reconstruction as a eudromaeosaur

Le Loeuff and Buffetaut described Variraptor as a maniraptoran theropod, a member of the Dromaeosauridae. In 2000, Ronan Allain and Philippe Taquet named a second small theropod from the same layers: Pyroraptor. They also claimed that Variraptor was a nomen dubium because the type lacked any single diagnostic trait. In the same year, Oliver Rauhut was also doubtful of the classification of Variraptor as a dromaeosaurid and assigned it to the more inclusive Coelurosauria.

In 2003, Allain and Pereda-Suberbiola considered Pyroraptor as the only diagnostic dromaeosaur of France and doubted the identity of Variraptor as a dromaeosaurid. They also questioned the associations of the referred materials, pointing out that the cervicodorsal vertebra referred to this genus is almost indistinguishable from that of Chirostenotes, a caenagnathid theropod. Thus, they concluded that Variraptor is probably a chimaera and a nomen dubium. In 2004, Mark Norell and Peter Makovicky suggested that the specimens of Variraptor show no unambiguous diagnostic features of dromaeosaurids, and that more specimens are required for confirmation of the taxon's identity.

In 2009, Buffetaut and Phomphen Chanthasit defended the validity of Variraptor against Allain and Taquet (2000), arguing the type had a unique combination of traits. The lack of overlapping parts would make it impossible to establish whether Pyroraptor was a junior subjective synonym but the presence of two different types of ulna in the southern French dromaeosaurid material would indicate two separate species. However, the authors did not refute the aforementioned claim of Allain and Pereda-Suberbiola (2003). In their 2012 review of dromaeosaurid systematics, Alan Turner, Peter Makovicky and Mark Norell supported the conclusion by Allain and Taquet (2000).

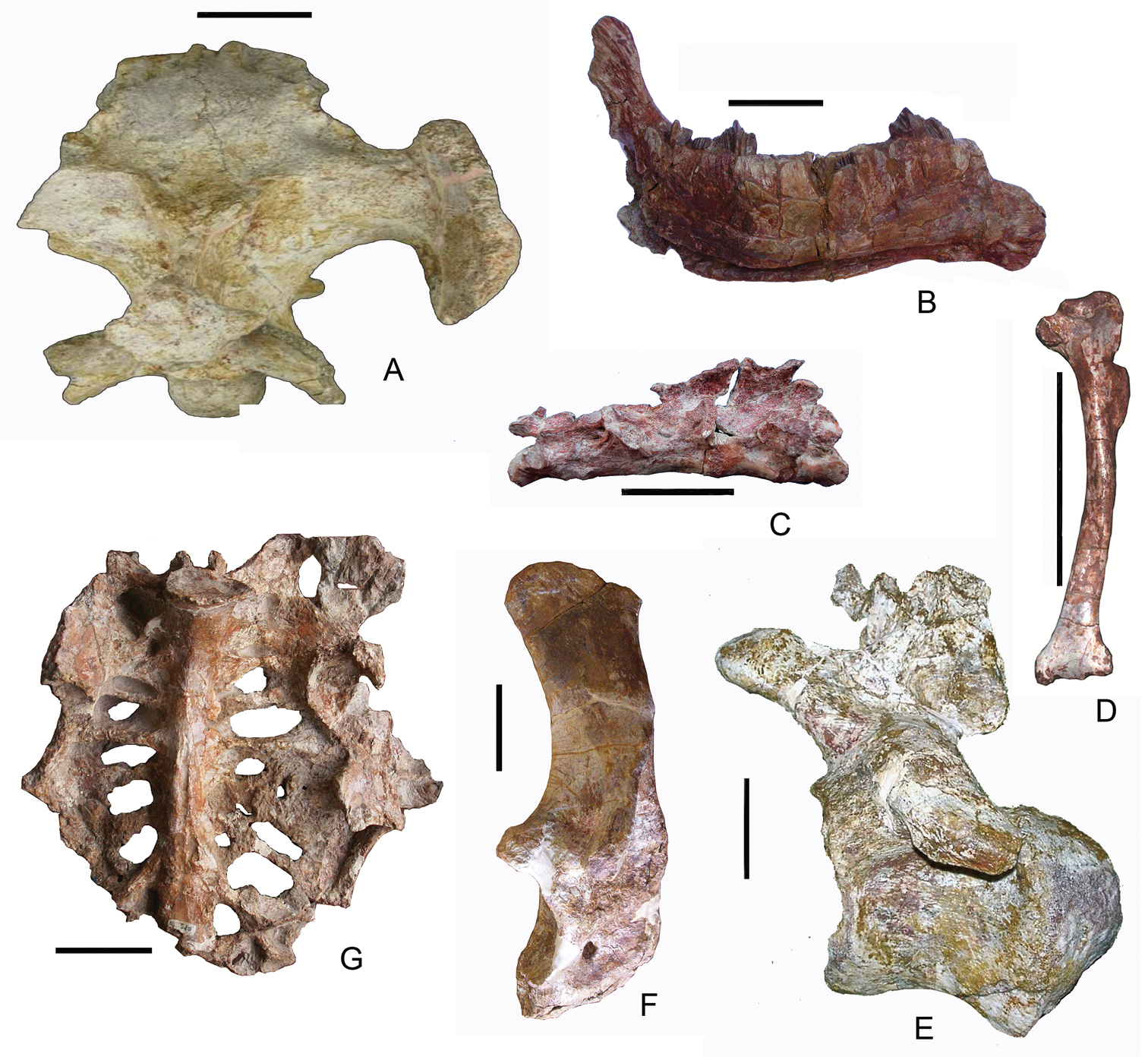
Assigned sacrum (C) among other French fossils

In a 2019 study describing the troodontid Hesperornithoides, Variraptor has been included in a phylogenetic analysis where it was recovered as the sister taxon of Bambiraptor, within an expanded Microraptoria. However, the authors of this study stated that a position within the Unenlagiidae was also possible, only requiring three extra steps in their matrix. In a 2022 study describing halszkaraptorine Natovenator, phylogenetic analyses recovered Variraptor within Unenlagiinae. In 2023, assuming that Variraptor and Pyroraptor may be valid different species, both have been recovered as dromaeosaurs, though their phylogenetic affinites and those of other deinonychosaurian theropods except for Balaur bondoc were not well established.

== See also ==
- Timeline of dromaeosaurid research
