= List of fossiliferous stratigraphic units in Idaho =

This article contains a list of fossil-bearing stratigraphic units in the state of Idaho, U.S.

== Sites ==
Group or Formation	Period	Notes
American Falls Lake Bed E Formation		
Arco Hills Formation	Carboniferous	
Beaverdam Formation	Neogene	
Black Mesa Gravel Formation		
Bruneau Formation	Pliocene-Pleistocene	
Chalk Hills Formation	Neogene	
Challis Volcanics Formation	Paleogene	
Clarkia Formation	Neogene	
Coon Hollow Formation	Jurassic	
Dinwoody Formation	Triassic	
Elkhead Limestone	Cambrian	
Garden City Formation	Ordovician	
Glenns Ferry Formation	Pliocene	
Hole Formation	Neogene	
Idavada Volcanics Formation	Neogene	
Imnaha Basalt Formation	Neogene	
Jefferson Formation	Devonian	
Lakeview Formation	Cambrian	
Langston Formation	Cambrian	
Latah Formation	Neogene	
Lead Bell Shale (Spence Shale) Formation	Cambrian	
Little Flat Formation	Carboniferous	
Lodgepole Formation	Carboniferous	
Lodgepole Limestone	Carboniferous	
Martin Bridge Formation	Triassic	
McGowan Creek Formation	Carboniferous	
Meade Peak Formation	Permian	
Middle Canyon Formation	Carboniferous	
Monroe Canyon Formation	Carboniferous	
Muldoon Canyon Formation	Carboniferous	
Park City Formation	Permian	
Peterson Creek Beds Formation		
Phi Kappa Formation	Silurian, Ordovician	
Phosphoria Formation	Permian	
Poison Creek Formation	Neogene	
Railroad Canyon Beds Formation	Neogene	
Rennie Shale	Cambrian	
Sage Junction Formation	Cretaceous	
Salmon City Formation	Paleogene	
Salt Lake Formation	Miocene-Pliocene	
Saturday Mountain Formation	Ordovician	
Seven Devils Group/Martin Bridge Formation	Triassic	
Snaky Canyon Formation	Permian	
St. Charles Formation	Cambrian	
Starlight Formation	Neogene	
Surrett Canyon Formation	Carboniferous	
Thaynes Formation	Triassic	
Thaynes Formation	Triassic	
Thaynes Formation	Triassic	
Thaynes Group/Thaynes Formation	Triassic	
Trail Canyon Formation	Permian	
Twin Creek Formation	Jurassic	
Ute Formation	Cambrian	
Valmy Group/Phi Kappa Formation	Ordovician	
Wayan Formation	Cretaceous	
White Knob Formation	Permian	
Woodside Formation	Triassic	

== See also ==
- Paleontology in Idaho
