= Park City Formation =

Geologic formation in the U.S. states of Montana, Wyoming, Idaho, and Utah

- Stratigraphic range: Kungurian-Guadalupian, ~280–260 Ma
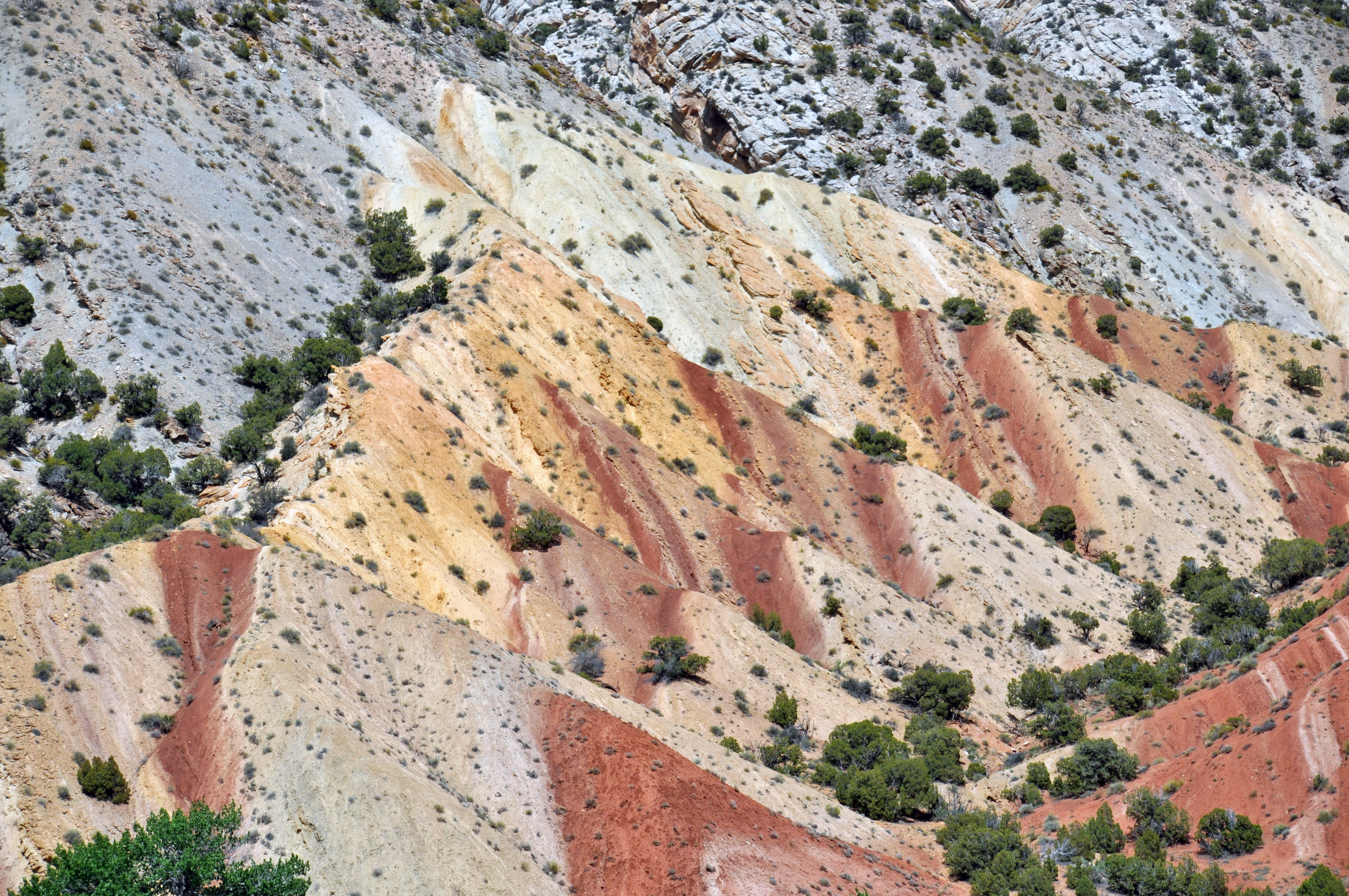
- Park City Formation in Dinosaur National Monument, Utah
- Type: Formation
- Underlies: Dinwoody Formation
- Overlies: Weber Formation, Tensleep Formation
- Area: 60,000 square kilometers
- Thickness: 300-30 meters

Location
- Region: Montana, Utah, Idaho, Wyoming
- Country: United States

Type section
- Named by: Boutwell, 1906

The Park City Formation is a fossiliferous sedimentary formation from the late Permian of Utah, Idaho, Wyoming, and Montana. It is defined by its cherty, gray to pinkish limestone, calcareous siltstone, and cherty sandstone. The rocks in this formation formed along a shallow marine continental shelf and were regularly interrupted by the Phosphoria Formation due to tectonic forces and sea level change.

== Geology ==
The Park City Formation was deposited across approximately 60,000 square kilometers of northern Utah, western Wyoming, and a small sliver of southwestern Montana. This deposition probably occurred across three distinct sea level fluctuations throughout the mid-late Permian. It sits squarely between the Phosphoria Formation (which is actually intercalated throughout several layers of the Park City Formation) to the North and West, and the Goose Egg Formation to the south and east. Exposed Park City Formation facies make a “J” shape through these three states. Dates of this formation span from the late Leonardian to the early Guadalupian epochs of the mid-late Permian (about 280-260 million years ago). This formation was deposited due to the subsidence of underlying Oquirrh and Sublett basins during the early and middle Paleozoic. This subsidence resulted in a relatively deep 'sink' where tidal sediments could then accumulate. At the time of its deposition, the Park City Formation ran along the western coast of Pangaea, at middle-Northern latitudes. It was thickest along its western side at about 300 meters, and slowly started to thin as it moved east to about 30 meters. Along its south end, the Park City Formation is divided into two members: the Grandeur and Franson. These two members are separated from each other by interwoven Phosphoria Formation deposits and an unconformity. Another unconformity further separates the upper and lower Franson members. This unconformity is a sequence of red shale from the Woodside Formation, and is labeled as the 'Mackentire Tongue'. However, as pointed out by Geldon (2002), the Woodside Formation is dated to be Early-Mid Triassic. This means that the red shale either isn't Woodside, or the Woodside Formation extends to the Permian. To the North, the Park City Formation is divided into three members: Grandeur, Franson, and Ervay. Franson and Ervay are again separated by an unconformity.

=== Facies ===
There are six distinct rock types with 15 facies of the Park City Formation, as detailed in Whalen, (1996). From oldest to youngest, the Park City Formation is composed of fine non-carbonates (chert and dolo-shale), sand/siltstones, conglomerates, coarse carbonates (rudstone, packstone, and grainstone), wackestones, and carbonate mudstones. The depths at which these rocks were formed range from deep subtidal to shallow peritidal. Underlying the Park City Formation are the Pennsylvanian and Early Permian sandstones of the Weber and Tensleep formations, and overlying is the Dinwoody Formation. The last epoch of the Permian is missing from the geologic record in this area, meaning there is a time gap of around 8 million years.

=== Depositional environment ===
These rock types, as well as the geological composition of surrounding formations, indicate that the Park City Formation's depositional environment was a series of shallow tidal flats and sabkha deposits in the east to continental shelf and deep water deposition in the west. Whalen (1996) posits that due to the water depth gradient, the Park City Formation (as well as surrounding formations) represents a carbonate ramp.

== History and economic significance ==
The Park City Formation was first described by Boutwell (1906, pages 443-446), who illustrated the formation simply as the rock beds underlying the red shales of the Woodside Formation, and Overlying the Pennsylvanian Weber quartzite. It was further surveyed by McKelvey and others in 1959, who detailed its economic significance. McKelvey and others labeled the Park City and Phosphoria formations as "the most extensive phosphorite beds in the United States." Phosphorite beds are the primary method of retrieving phosphorus and phosphates, which are used as fertilizer in arid soil. Weathering and heat reduce phosphorus levels in soil, which native plants are acclimated to. However, imported crops need phosphorus/phosphate supplements to properly grow in dry climates. Additionally, phosphorus is used in manufacturing detergents.

== Fossils ==
The Park City Formation also has a plentiful conodont and cephalopod record. The latest Permian beds of the Park City Formation and the earliest Triassic beds of the Dinwoody represent a mostly continuous sequence, which is extremely rare around this time. This sequence is significant because the largest mass extinction in Earth's history occurred right at the boundary of these two time periods. Using conodonts, researchers have defined the Permian-Triassic boundary at the base of the Dinwoody Formation, and just after the Park City Formation. This is supported by the Park City Formation's presence of Merrillina divergens, a conodont that only occurs at the latest stages of the Permian. Cephalopod occurrence in the Park City Formation, namely Stacheoceras, Gastrioceras, Goniatites, and Waagenoceras, further supports its age being the latest Permian.

== See also ==
- List of fossiliferous stratigraphic units in Montana
- Paleontology in Montana
- Paleontology in Utah
- Paleontology in Idaho
- Paleontology in Wyoming
- Woodside Formation
- Thaynes Formation
- Permian-Triassic Extinction Event
- Conodont
