= Langston Formation =

Geologic formation in Idaho and Utah

- Stratigraphic range: Cambrian
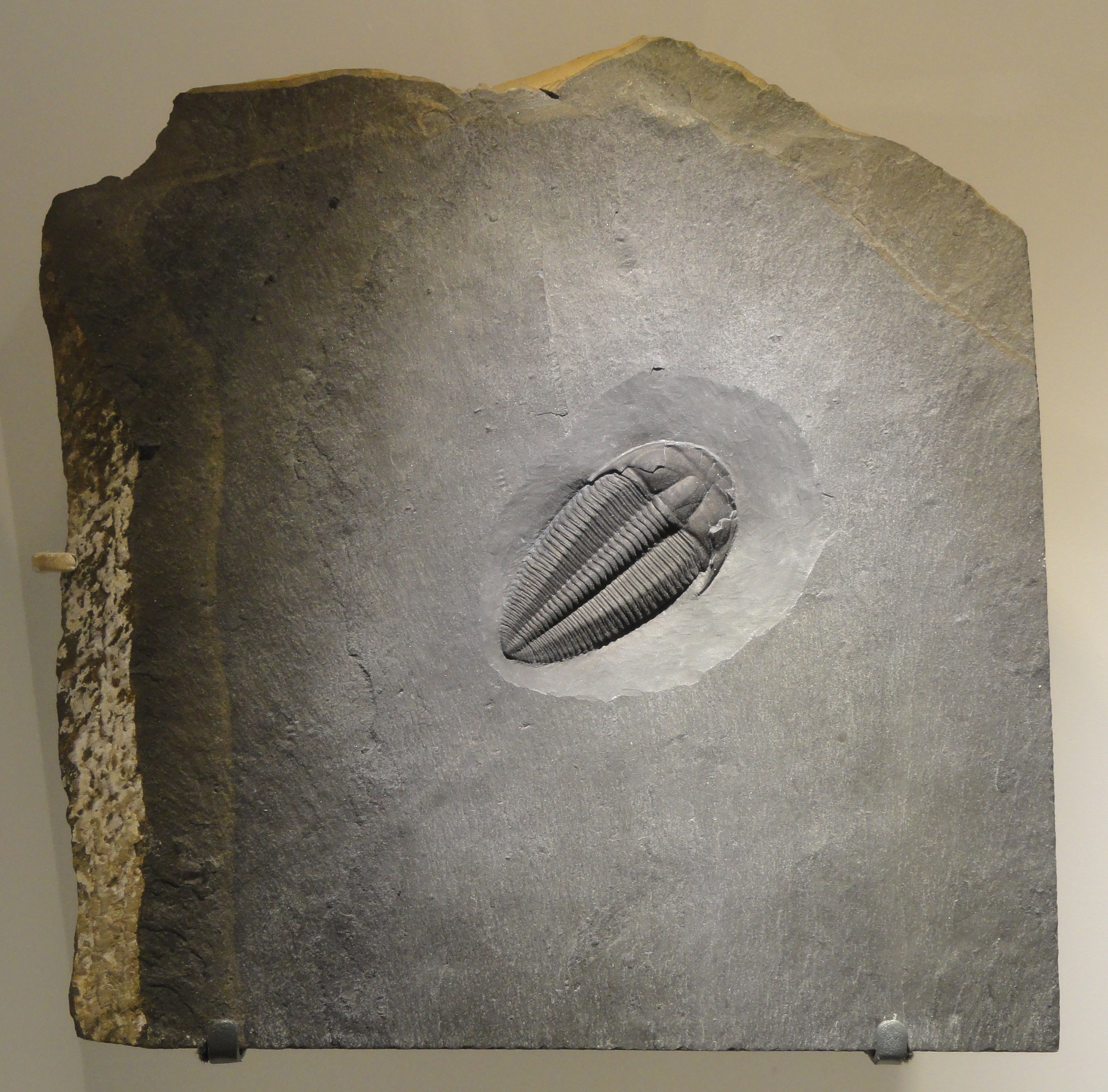
- Fossils from the Langston Formation, Wellsville Mountains, Utah
- Type: Formation
- Underlies: Ute Formation
- Overlies: Brigham Formation
- Thickness: 30 - 498'

Location
- Region: Idaho, Utah
- Country: United States

Type section
- Named for: Langston Creek
- Named by: Charles Doolittle Walcott

The Langston Formation is a geologic formation in Idaho and Utah. It preserves fossils dating back to the Cambrian period. The formation is composed of bluish-gray limestone, weathering to a buff color, often with rounded edges.

Blacksmith Fork is the type locality, and includes more fossils than the Idaho sections.

The Langston Formation includes the fossilerous Spence Shale.

== See also ==
- List of fossiliferous stratigraphic units in Idaho
- Paleontology in Idaho
