= Hagerman Horse Quarry =

Paleontological site west of Hagerman, Idaho, USA

The Hagerman Horse Quarry is a paleontological site containing the largest concentration of Hagerman horse (Equus simplicidens) fossils yet found. The quarry is within Hagerman Fossil Beds National Monument, located west of Hagerman, Idaho, USA, at the geographic division of the Snake River Plain. The Hagerman Horse Quarry is an integral part of the monument and is located on the northern flank of Fossil Gulch in the northern portion of the monument.

The Hagerman Horse Quarry resides near the top of the hillside of Smithsonian Hill. The hill was named from the early Smithsonian excavations of the Hagerman horse. The Hagerman horse is the first fossil representation of the genus Equus in North America.

Historically, the Hagerman Horse Quarry was divided into three informal subquarries, the red, the green and white quarry sandstones. Fossils are found throughout the monument; however the Horse Quarry continues to be the focus of paleontological research.

The Hagerman Fossil Beds National Monument visitor center is administered by the National Park Service. There is a skeleton reconstruction of a Hagerman horse at the visitor center in Hagerman, Idaho. The Hagerman Fossil Beds National Monument reopened the Hagerman Horse Quarry during the summer of 1997. The Hagerman Horse Quarry is closed to visitors.

== History ==
The Hagerman Horse Quarry has experienced a diverse collection history. Elmer Cook, a local rancher and resident of the area, first discovered fossil horse remains in the late 1920s. He reported the find to Dr. Harold T. Stearns of the United States Geological Survey, who in turn brought it to the attention of Dr. James W. Gidley of the Smithsonian Institution. The Smithsonian Institution field crew excavated from all three quarry beds during the years 1929-1931 and 1934 (Richmond and others, 2002).

The University of Utah, under the direction of Mr. Golden York, acquired fossils from the quarry in 1953. The Natural History Museum of Los Angeles County managed their excavation during the summer of 1966. The Idaho Museum of Natural History collected material during the fall of 1966 and early summer of 1967. The following year, the Pacific Union College in Angwin, California conducted a small excavation. An unknown quantity of fossil material was removed prior to the establishment of the Hagerman Fossil Beds National Monument in 1988 (Richmond and others, 2002).

== Quarry fossils ==
Based on the documented number of skulls collected from the Hagerman Horse Quarry, at least 200 Hagerman horses are represented from the quarry. Besides the fossil horse, Equus simplicidens, other large vertebrates collected from the quarry include an antelope, a camel and a peccary. Small mammalian fossil vertebrate genera include hare, weasel, gopher, vole and shrew. Also represented are fossil woodland birds, waterfowl, snakes, turtles, lizards, frogs, toads, salamanders and a variety of fish. Fossil bivalves and gastropods are also represented from the quarry (Richmond and others, 2002).

== Quarry stratigraphy ==
The western Snake River Plain consists of rift basin sediments that accumulated during the Miocene through Pleistocene Epochs. These clastic sedimentary packages, interbedded with basaltic flows, pyroclastic tephra and silicic volcanic ashes, have a cumulative thickness of 1524 meters (5000 feet), span about 10.5 Ma, and comprise the seven formations of the Idaho Group. The seven formations, in ascending order, are the Poison Creek, Branbury Basalt, Chalk Hills, Glenns Ferry, Tuana Gravel, Bruneau and Black Mesa Gravel (Richmond and others, 2002).

The Pliocene Glenns Ferry Formation spans 5.0 to 1.5 Ma. The formation overlies the Branbury Basalt in the Hagerman area. The Glenns Ferry Formation is composed primarily of poorly consolidated lacustrine and fluvial sediments. The primary exposures of lacustrine sediments consist of laterally continuous very fine-grained sandstone and mudstone beds that outcrop near Glenns Ferry, Idaho (47 km west of Hagerman, Idaho) (Richmond and others, 2002).

In the Hagerman Fossil Beds National Monument, the Glenns Ferry Formation has a maximum thickness of approximately 183 meters (600 feet) and spans the interval 4.5 to 3.0 Ma. The Glenns Ferry Formation consists of sandstones, siltstones, mudstones, and shales. Basaltic flows and deposits of basaltic tephra and ash of varying thicknesses are interbedded within the sedimentary strata. Thin silicic ash beds are also present. The formation is divided into three informal members based upon depositional facies changes. The lower and middle members are delineated by the Peter's Gulch rhyolitic ash (age 3.7 Ma). The middle and upper members are separated by the Fossil Gulch dacite ash (age 3.3 Ma) (Richmond and others, 2002).

Lithostratigraphically, the Hagerman Horse Quarry is located within the upper member of the Glenns Ferry Formation and lies 9.5 meters below the contact with the overlying Tuana Gravel. The Plio-Pleistocene Tuana Gravel unconformably overlies the Glenns Ferry Formation and is described as a series of cyclic beds of silt, pebble sands and cobble gravel. Sedimentological data of the Tuana Gravel indicates the gravel beds were deposited on a northwest sloping alluvial plain. Thickness of the gravel beds varies, but is about 50 feet in Fossil Gulch area. The Tuana Gravel is overlain by a caliche, thought to have formed during a Pleistocene interglacial period, and several feet of recent soils (Richmond and others 2002).

== Quarry deposition ==
Dr. James W. Gidley (1930) originally interpreted the Smithsonian fossiliferous red sandstone bed to have been deposited in a bog or water hole. Death of the animals, he thought, was the result of attrition. C. L. Gazin (1934) agreed with Gidley's depositional interpretation, but suggested the bog may have trapped the animals. Basing their conclusions on historical information, photographs, and collection samples, Akersten and Thompson (1992) proposed the fossil accumulation was the result of a single flood event, which trapped and killed the horses, then transported their carcasses. They concluded that deposition and burial of the carcasses occurred during subsequent flooding events. Basing his interpretation on historical information and photographs coupled with a population configuration of ancient horse herds, G. McDonald (1996) suggested the horses were killed in a single catastrophic flood event.

The Hagerman Horse Quarry consists of three different fluvial sandstones. The Smithsonian Institution field crew excavated from all three quarry beds during the years 1929-1931 and 1934. The three sandstone beds are informally called the red, green, and white sandstone beds (Gazin, 1934). The Hagerman Fossil Beds National Monument reopened the Horse Quarry during the summer of 1997. The only sandstone now exposed within the monument is the white sandstone. The red and green sandstone remain covered by alluvium (Richmond and others, 2002).

The white sandstone is a medium grained, poorly sorted, trough cross-bedded braided fluvial channel. Presently there is a longitudinal channel bar remaining in the quarry. The grain size indicates moderate paleoflow velocities with a paleocurrent direction to the south-southwest. All three quarry sandstones are interpreted to be ephemeral braided fluvial channel systems that were deposited in the Snake River Plain graben (Richmond and others, 2002).

== Taphonomy ==
The white sandstone accumulation, consisting of hundreds of bones, resulted from a moderate drought and an ephemeral flood. The Phase II drought on the Snake River Plain resulted in a mass mortality of Equus simplicidens in addition to many other macro- and microvertebrates in the quarry area. The terrestrial animals were attracted to a drying pond or marsh, where they died of drought-induced starvation, dehydration, and illness. Decomposition processes resulted in a substantial accumulation of disarticulated bones (i.e. bones of skeletons that are no longer joined). Subsequently, an ephemeral flood traversed the dry paludal deposit, transporting and depositing the bones. Geologic and taphonomic evidence indicates the bones traveled a very short distance prior to deposition and burial (Richmond and others, 2002).

The red sandstone bed, which stratigraphically underlies the white sandstone bed, also contains fossil material. The Smithsonian Institution excavated the majority of the Hagerman horse fossils from this bed during the 1930s. The taphonomic evidence of this bed indicates that a mass mortality of Equus simplicidens was the result of an earlier drought. The red sandstone bed was deposited under fluvial conditions similar to those evidenced in the white sandstone bed (Richmond and others, 2002).

== See also ==
- List of fossiliferous stratigraphic units in Idaho
