= Arco Hills Formation =

Geologic formation in Idaho

- Stratigraphic range: Carboniferous
- Type: Formation

Location
- Region: Idaho
- Country: United States

The Arco Hills Formation is a geologic formation in Idaho. It preserves fossils dating back to the Carboniferous period.

== See also ==
- List of fossiliferous stratigraphic units in Idaho
- Paleontology in Idaho
