= Salt Lake Formation =

Geological formation in the western US

- Stratigraphic range: Miocene-Pliocene
- Type: Formation

Location
- Region: Idaho and Utah
- Country: United States

The Salt Lake Formation is a geologic formation exposed principally in Northern Utah and Southeast Idaho, with other small exposures in Southwest Wyoming and Northeast Nevada. Dates generally range from mid-Miocene to early Pliocene, with most dates falling between 10 Ma to 4 Ma, but perhaps starting as early as 15 Ma and extending to as late as 2 Ma in places. The primarily sedimentary record preserves lacustrine and alluvial fan environments, as well as a few tuffaceous expressions. Preserved fossils include Blancan fauna.

== See also ==
- List of fossiliferous stratigraphic units in Idaho
- Paleontology in Idaho
