= Peterson Creek Beds =

Geologic formation in Idaho, United States

Peterson Creek Beds Formation
- Type: Formation

Location
- Region: Idaho
- Country: United States

The Peterson Creek Beds Formation is a geologic formation in Idaho. It preserves fossils.

== See also ==
- List of fossiliferous stratigraphic units in Idaho
- Paleontology in Idaho
