= Black Mesa Gravel Formation =

Geologic formation in Idaho, United States

Black Mesa Gravel
- Type: Formation

Location
- Region: Idaho
- Country: United States

The Black Mesa Gravel is a geologic formation in Idaho. It preserves fossils.

== See also ==
- Hagerman Horse Quarry
- List of fossiliferous stratigraphic units in Idaho
- Paleontology in Idaho
