= Martin Bridge Limestone =

Geologic formation in Idaho

Martin Bridge Formation
- Stratigraphic range: Triassic
- Type: Formation

Location
- Region: Idaho
- Country: United States

The Martin Bridge Formation is a geologic formation in Idaho. It preserves fossils dating back to the Triassic period.

== See also ==
- List of fossiliferous stratigraphic units in Idaho
- Paleontology in Idaho
