= Idavada, Idaho =

Idavada
- Historical locale
- Location within the state of Idaho
- Coordinates: 41°59′50″N 114°38′29″W
- Country: United States
- State: Idaho
- County: Twin Falls
- Time zone: UTC-7 (Mountain (MST))
  - Summer (DST): UTC-6 (MDT)

Idavada, a portmanteau of Idaho & Nevada, is a historical locale in Twin Falls County, Idaho. It is Idaho's southernmost named area. It is home to the Idavada Volcanics formation of silicic rocks. The nearest major highway is U.S. Route 93, and the nearest established settlement is Jackpot, Nevada.
