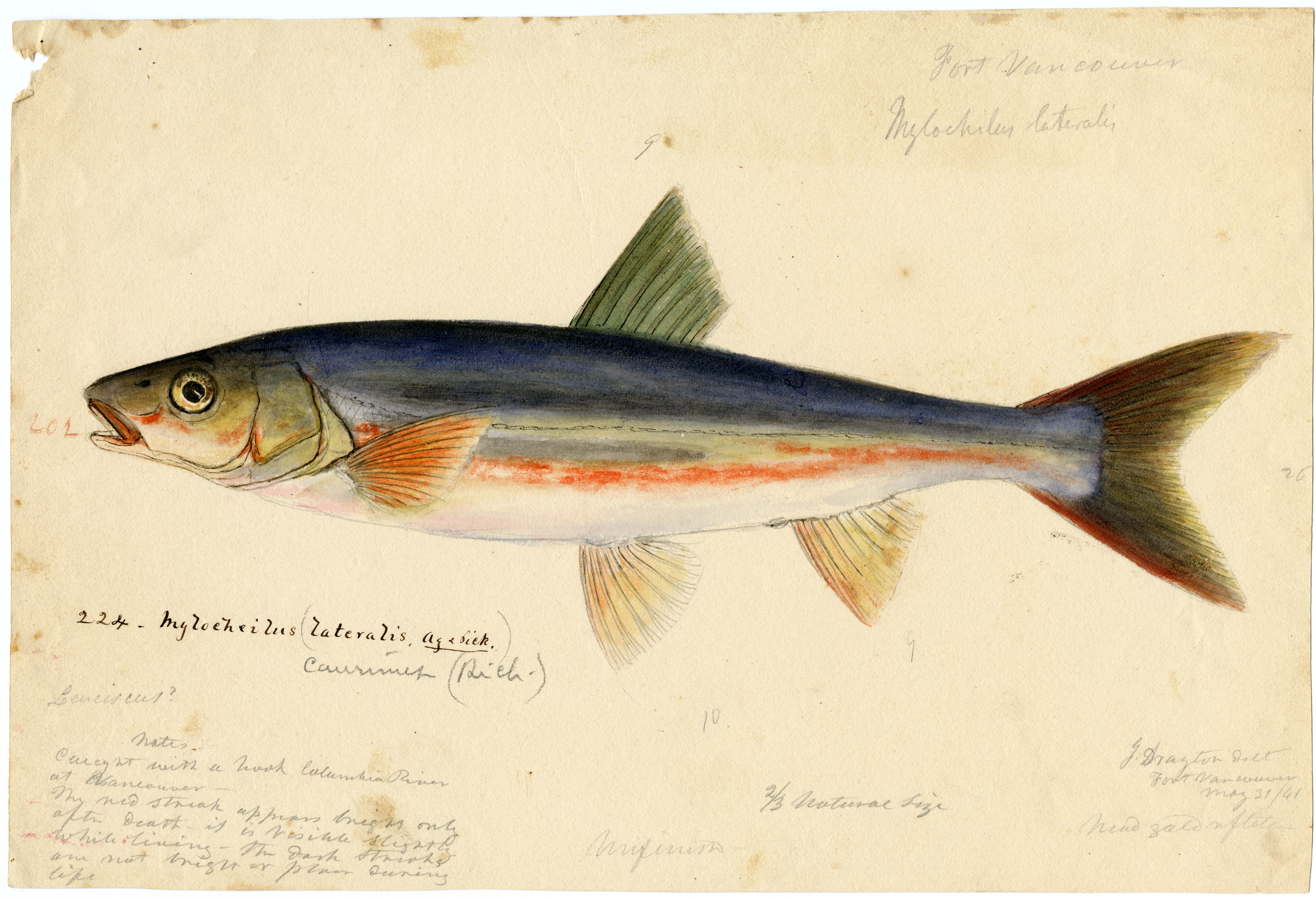

Conservation status
- Least Concern (IUCN 3.1)

Scientific classification
- Kingdom: Animalia
- Phylum: Chordata
- Class: Actinopterygii
- Order: Cypriniformes
- Family: Leuciscidae
- Subfamily: Pogonichthyinae
- Genus: Mylocheilus; Agassiz, 1855
- Species: M. caurinus

Binomial name
- Mylocheilus caurinus (J. Richardson, 1836)

Synonyms
- Cyprinus caurinus Richardson, 1836; Clarkina caurina (Richardson, 1836); Mylocheilus lateralis Agassiz & Pickering, 1855; Mylocheilus fraterculus Girard, 1856; Cheonda cooperi Girard, 1856

= Peamouth =

Peamouth Temporal range: Late Miocene to present

Species of fish

The peamouth (Mylocheilus caurinus), also known as the peamouth chub, redmouth sucker or northwestern dace, is a species of freshwater ray-finned fish from the family Leuciscidae, the shiners, daces and minnows. This species is found in western North America.

== Taxonomy ==
The peamouth is the only extant species in the genus Mylocheilus. However, three fossil species are also known from the Late Miocene and Pliocene of western North America.

- †Mylocheilus inflexus (Cope, 1883) - Late Miocene/Early Pliocene of Deer Butte Formation (Oregon), Pliocene of the Glenns Ferry Formation (Idaho)
- †Mylocheilus robustus (Leidy, 1870) - Late Miocene/Early Pliocene of Deer Butte Formation (Oregon), Pliocene of the Glenns Ferry Formation (Idaho)
- †Mylocheilus whitei Smith & Cossel, 2002 - Late Miocene (Hemphillian) of the Poison Creek Formation (Idaho)

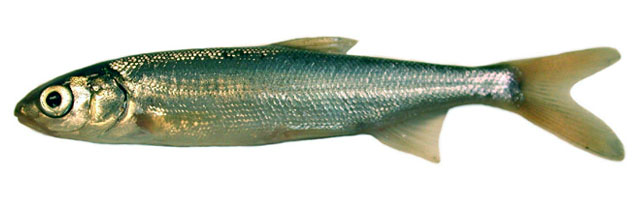
peamouth

== Description ==
The peamouth is a slender fish, with a somewhat compressed body and a subterminal mouth, large eyes, a rounded snout and a forked tail. It has a dark back, contrasting with silvery underparts separated by two dusky, longitudinal stripes. The mouth is reddish at the corners where there are small barbels. When breeding the mature males develop a red stripe along the sides on the belly, mouth, gill cover and pectoral fin base. The dorsal fin and the anal fin each have 8 soft rays and the lateral line has 66–84 scales. They can grow to 36 centimetres (14 in) in total length.

== Distribution ==
The peamouth occurs in western North America from the Mackenzie River in the North West Territories, the Nass River and the Peace River in British Columbia and the Columbia River drainage in Washington state, Oregon, Montana and Idaho. It is relatively tolerant of salt water and this has allowed it to colonise rivers on Vancouver Island and other islands off the coast of British Columbia. It has been introduced to the Redwood National Park in California.

== Habitat ==
The peamouth can be found in the shallow, weedy zones of lakes and rivers, where it is most common among vegetation. It is usually found near the bed in depths of less than 60 feet (18 m), although in winter they will move to the deeper parts of lakes.

== Biology ==
Young peamouths feed predominantly on micro-crustaceans which are also preyed on by the adult fish but their diet is expanded to include snails, adult aquatic and terrestrial insects and even the occasional small fish.

The peamouth reaches sexual maturity at 3–4 years old, the males normally reaching it faster than the females. Spawning takes place in May and June when the water reaches temperatures of 54–64 °F (12–18 °C), and happens in streams or along the shores of lakes where there are gravel or stony substrates in shallow water which is within 3 feet (0.91 m) of the bank. The eggs adhere to rocks or other substrates. The fish may spawn several times in a season, and the timing of spawning is not fully understood. The spawning runs of the peamouth make an impressive natural spectacle as the brightly colored fish move into areas of warm, shallow, flowing water in large numbers. These schools attract many fish-eating predators. The newly hatched fry form schools near the shore, moving into deeper water later in the summer. Each female is normally attended by at least two males and can lay between 5,000 and 30,000 eggs, the amount being dependent on the age and size of the individual fish.

The fish may spend the day in deeper water and move to the shallows to feed at night. They are preyed on by a variety of piscivorous mammals and birds, as well as by larger fish species. They may attain a life span of 8 years

== Human use ==
They have been used as a food fish by people the past and are still fished for by anglers. In Bellevue City near Seattle has an online alert system which informs people when the peamouth appear to spawn in the local streams so that interested people can observe the spectacle, being informed by email whenever the fish are observed.

== Hybridisation ==
Hybrids between the peamouth and the Northern pikeminnow (Ptychocheilus oregonensis) and the redside shiner (Richardsonius balteatus) have been recorded throughout North America. The latter hybrid was once described as Cheonda cooperi before its true nature was discovered.
