= Valmy Group =

Geologic group in Idaho, United States

- Stratigraphic range: Ordovician
- Type: Group

Location
- Region: Idaho
- Country: United States

The Valmy Group is a geologic group in Idaho. It preserves fossils dating back to the Ordovician period.

== See also ==
- List of fossiliferous stratigraphic units in Idaho
- Paleontology in Idaho
