= Seven Devils Group =

- Stratigraphic range: Triassic
- Type: Group

Location
- Region: Idaho
- Country: United States

The Seven Devils Group is a geologic group in Idaho. It preserves fossils dating back to the Triassic period.

== See also ==
- List of fossiliferous stratigraphic units in Idaho
- Paleontology in Idaho
