= Idavada Volcanics =

Geologic formation in Idaho

- Stratigraphic range: Neogene
- Type: Formation

Location
- Region: Idaho
- Country: United States

The Idavada Volcanics is a geologic formation in Idaho. It preserves fossils dating back to the Neogene period.

== See also ==
- List of fossiliferous stratigraphic units in Idaho
- Paleontology in Idaho
