= Bruneau Formation =

Geologic formation in Idaho, United States

- Stratigraphic range: Pliocene-Pleistocene
- Type: Formation

Location
- Region: Idaho
- Country: United States

The Bruneau Formation is a geologic formation in Idaho. It preserves fossils.

== See also ==
- List of fossiliferous stratigraphic units in Idaho
- Paleontology in Idaho
