= Thaynes Limestone =

Geologic formation in Montana and Idaho, USA

Thaynes Formation
- Stratigraphic range: Triassic
- Type: Formation
- Underlies: Ankareh Formation
- Overlies: Woodside Formation

Lithology
- Primary: Limestone

Location
- Region: Montana, Idaho, Wyoming
- Country: United States

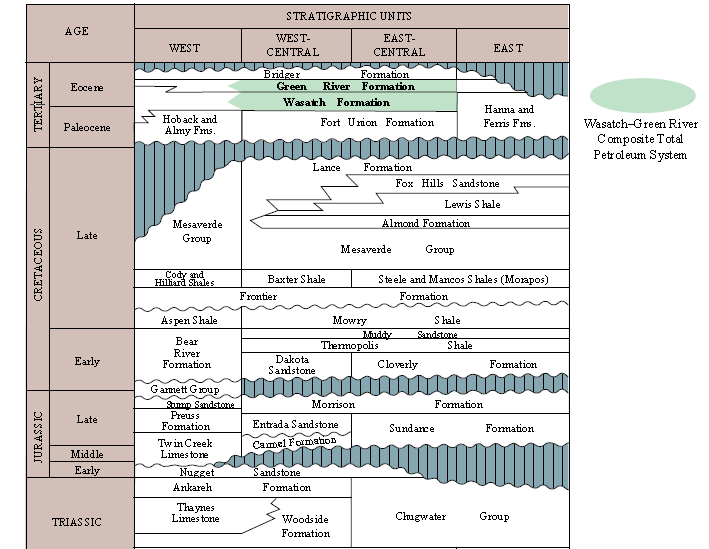
Thaynes Limestone within Green River Basin stratigraphy

The Thaynes Formation is a geologic formation in Montana and Idaho, United States. It was recently elevated to group status, as the Thaynes Group.

It preserves fossils dating back to the Triassic period, such as Ammonoidea, Actinopterygii, Actinistia, Conodonta, Gastropoda, Nautiloidea, Ichthyosauria, and others. A diverse fauna known as the Paris biota has been described from the Thaynes Formation.

== See also ==
- List of fossiliferous stratigraphic units in Montana
- Paleontology in Montana
- Paleontology in Idaho
