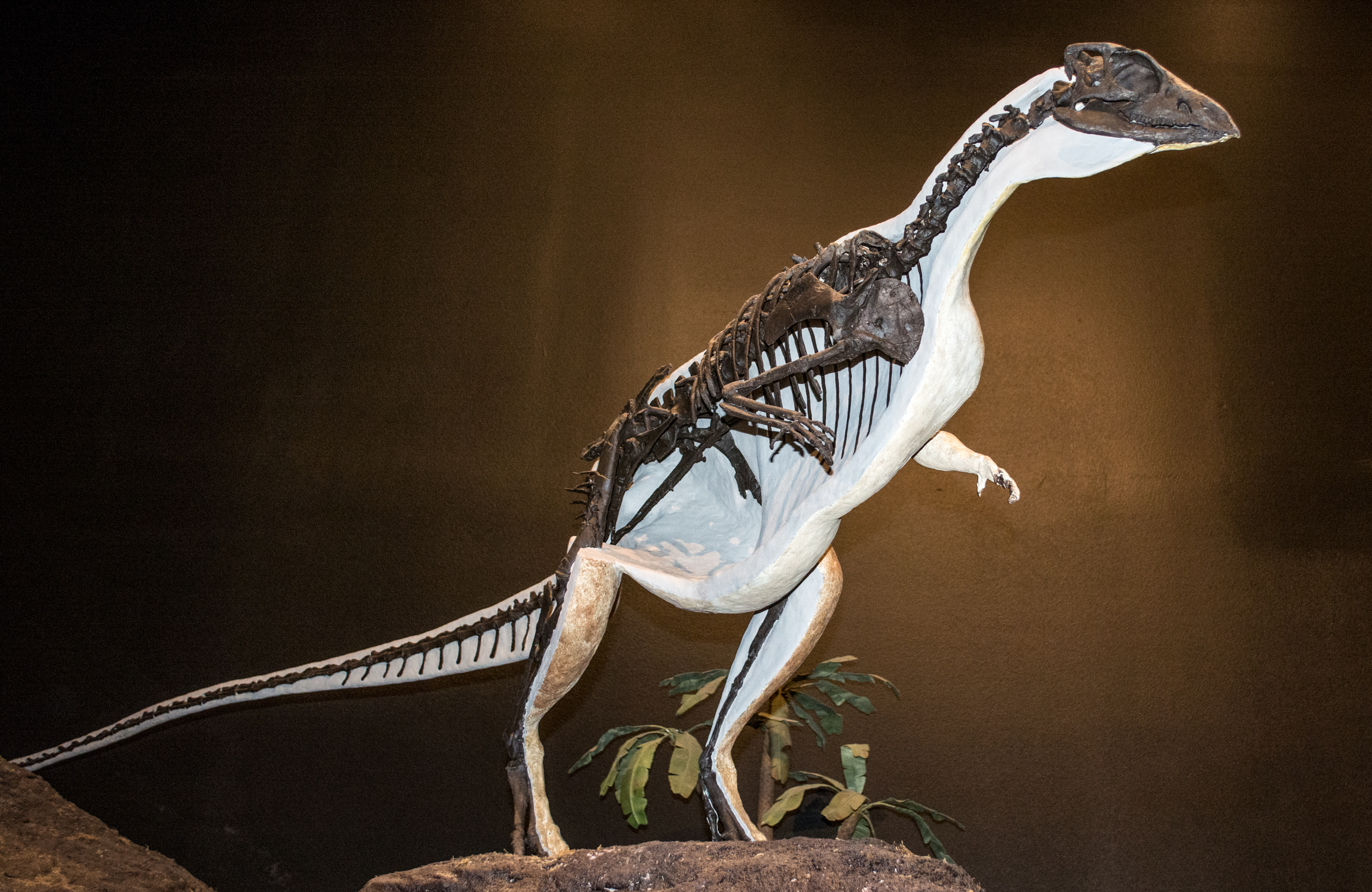
- Reconstructed skeleton, Museum of the Rockies

Scientific classification
- Kingdom: Animalia
- Phylum: Chordata
- Class: Reptilia
- Clade: Dinosauria
- Clade: †Ornithischia
- Family: †Thescelosauridae
- Subfamily: †Orodrominae
- Genus: †Oryctodromeus; Varricchio et al., 2007

Type species
- †Oryctodromeus cubicularis Varricchio et al., 2007

= Oryctodromeus =

Oryctodromeus Temporal range: 'mid'-Cretaceous (Albian–Cenomanian), ~105–96 Ma

Extinct genus of dinosaurs

Oryctodromeus (from Ancient Greek ὀρυκτήρ (oruktḗs), meaning "digger", and δρομαῖος (dromaîos), meaning "runner") is an extinct genus of small orodromine thescelosaurid dinosaur. Fossils are known from the mid-Cretaceous Blackleaf Formation of southwestern Montana and the Wayan Formation of southeastern Idaho, USA, both from around the Albian–Cenomanian ages, roughly 105-96 million years ago. A member of the small, presumably fast-running herbivorous family Thescelosauridae, Oryctodromeus is the first non-avian dinosaur published that shows evidence of burrowing behavior.

== Description ==
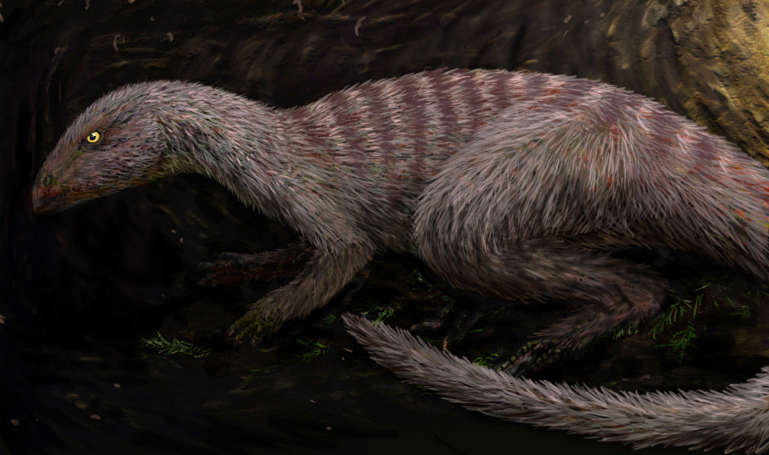
Restoration of an individual in its burrow

Oryctodromeus was originally described as lacking ossified tendons in the tail. However, specimens from the Wayan Formation demonstrate the presence of a thick tendon lattice in the dorsal, sacral, and caudal columns of some specimens; perhaps indicating more flexibility in ossified tendons than has previously been supposed. Adaptations in the jaws, forelimbs, and pelvis were described in the Blackleaf specimens that could have helped move and manipulate soil. Additional material from the Wayan Formation demonstrates further adaptations for digging in the femur.

The scapula and humerus of Oryctodromeus are more robust than those of other bipedal ornithischians, indicative of powerful shoulder muscles and resistance to force. These adaptations are present in scratch-digging mammals, and probably related to burrowing behavior in Oryctodromeus. However, it had only modest forelimb modifications in comparison to dedicated burrowing animals, like moles, echidnas, and wombats. Instead, it was comparable to, but somewhat more specialized for digging than animals that both run and burrow today, like aardwolves, cavies, hyenas, and rabbits. Because it was a biped, it could have a more modified forelimb without affecting its ability to run.

== Discovery ==
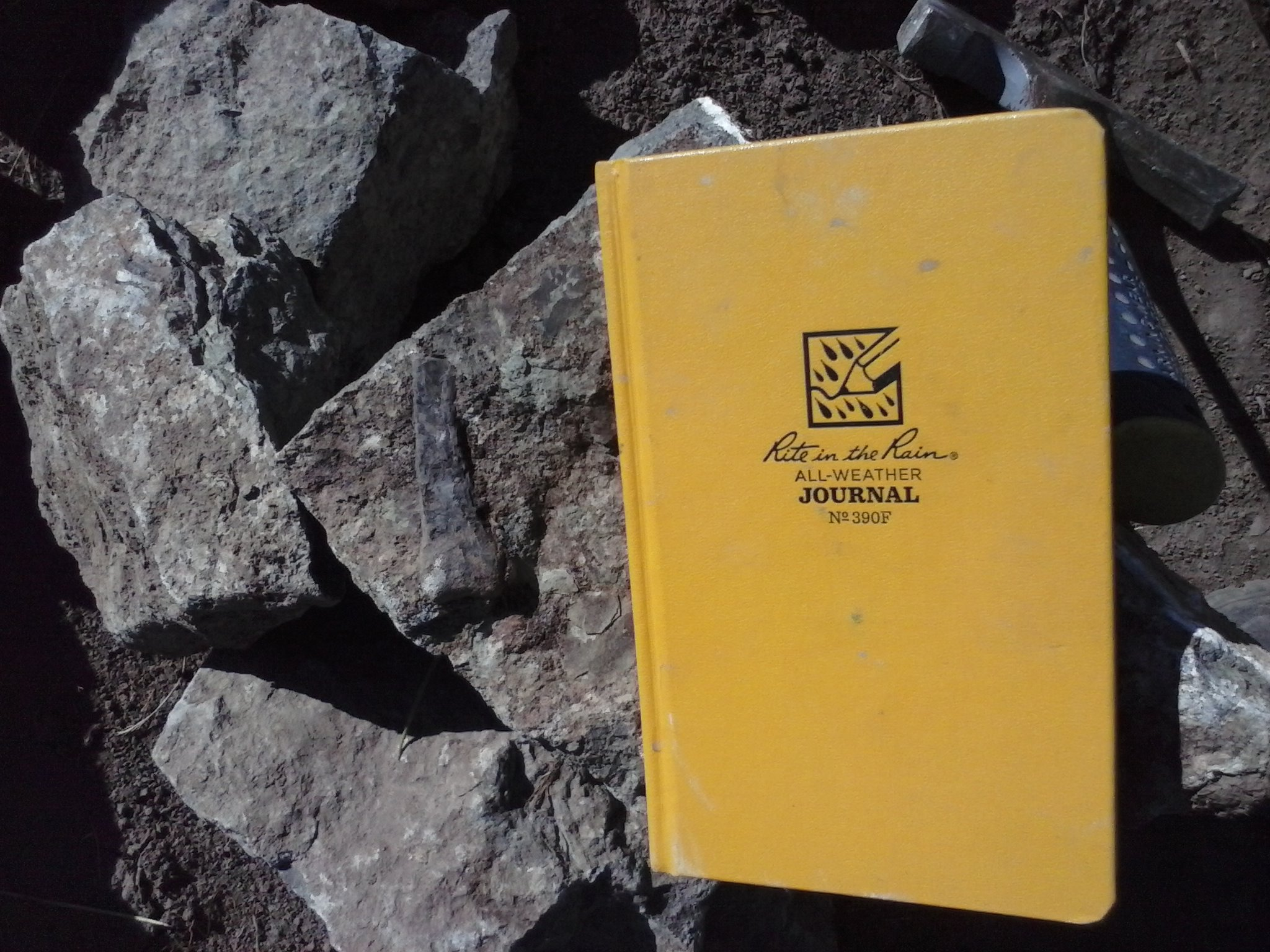
Metatarsal in situ.

Oryctodromeus is based on specimens from the Blackleaf Formation: MOR 1636a, a partial skeleton of an adult individual including: the premaxillae (upper beak); part of the braincase; three neck, six back, seven hip, and twenty-three tail vertebrae; ribs; the shoulder girdle; an arm (minus the hand); both tibiae and an incomplete fibula; and a metatarsal. Two additional individuals, both juveniles about 55 to 65% the size of MOR 1636a, are represented by MOR 1636b. Numerous additional partial skeletons are known from the Wayan Formation.

In 2023, Oryctodromeus was designated as the state dinosaur of Idaho, in which many of its fossils have been recovered.

== Classification ==
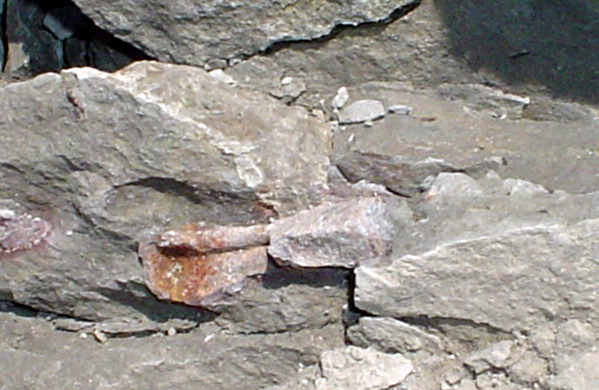
Caudal vertebrae

Under a cladistic analysis, Oryctodromeus was found to be basal within Euornithopoda and a close relative of the hypsilophodonts Orodromeus and Zephyrosaurus, which are also known from the Cretaceous of Montana. These two animals share adaptations with Oryctodromeus that may have been used for burrowing, such as a broad snout. Additionally, Orodromeus specimens have been found preserved in a similar way, suggesting that they too were in burrows. This would not be the first time that a hypsilophodont has been suggested as a burrower; Robert Bakker has informally claimed since the 1990s that Drinker, from the late Jurassic of Wyoming, lived in burrows, but this has yet to be published.

== Paleobiology ==
As a basal ornithopod, Oryctodromeus would have been a small, swift herbivore. This aspect, coupled with where it was discovered, gives it its name: Oryctodromeus cubicularis translates as "digging runner of the lair", in reference to its presumed lifestyle. The adult Oryctodromeus itself measured 2.1 m (6.9 ft) long and would have weighed about 22-32 kilograms (50-70 pounds), and the juveniles would have been about 1.3 m (4.3 ft) long. The presence of juveniles with the adult suggests parental care, and that at least one motivation for burrowing was to rear the juveniles. The size of the juveniles suggests an extended period of parental care.

=== Burrowing behavior ===
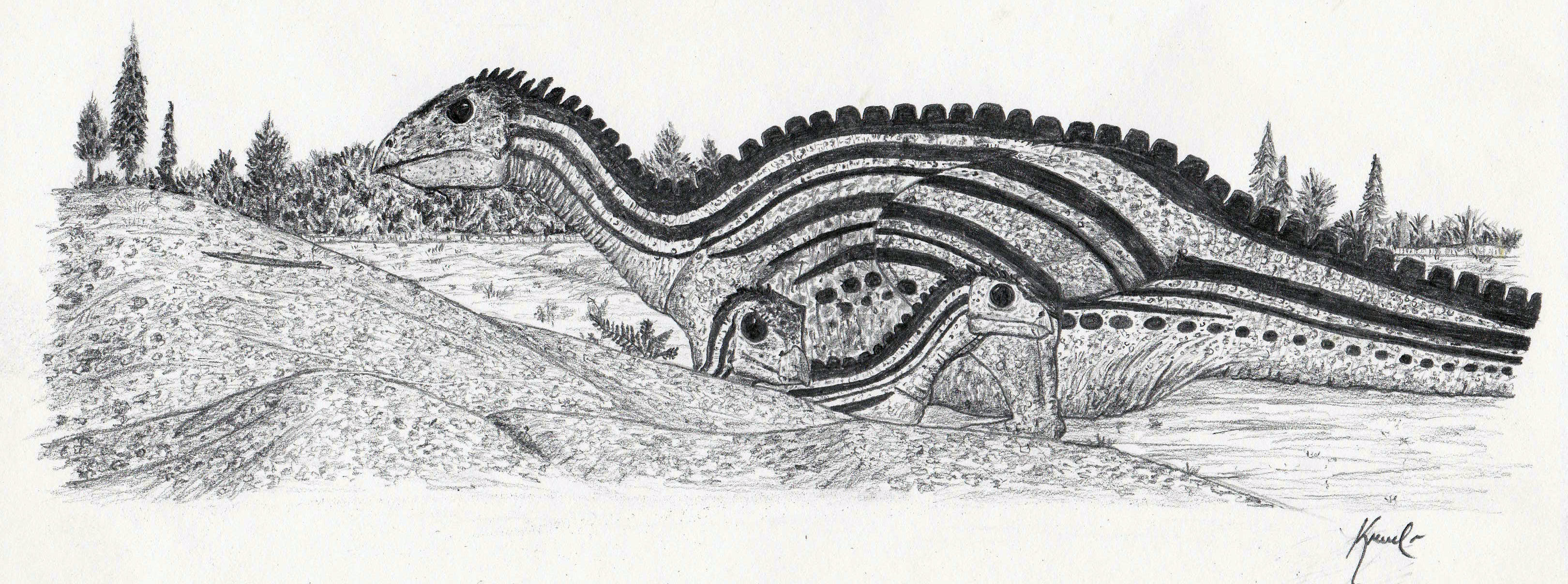
Family outside their burrow

The three Oryctodromeus individuals were found buried within the remains of an underground den or burrow that measured about 2 meters (6.6 feet) long and 70 centimeters (2.3 feet) wide. The skeletons were densely packed and disarticulated, indicating that the animals died and decayed within the burrow. The burrow is similar to those made by hyenas and puffins today. It was filled with sand, and the resulting sandstone stands out against the surrounding mudstone and claystone.

There are two turns in the preserved burrow section, and smaller secondary sandstone cylinders of various sizes (a few centimeters or inches in cross-section at most) that were probably made by smaller animals sharing the burrow (commensal). The burrow closely fits the probable proportions of the adult dinosaur, another indication that it was the digger.
