= Waagenoceras =

Waagenoceras Temporal range: Early Permian

Scientific classification
- Kingdom: Animalia
- Phylum: Mollusca
- Class: Cephalopoda
- Subclass: †Ammonoidea
- Order: †Goniatitida
- Family: †Cyclolobidae
- Genus: †Waagenoceras; Gemmellaro, 1887

Genus of molluscs (fossil)

Waagenoceras is an extinct genus of cephalopods first recorded in the early Permian Period. It has been described as a 'fast-moving nektonic carnivore' by the Paleobiology Database.

== Distribution ==
Fossils have been found in Canada, mainly in British Columbia, though the overwhelming majority have been found in Texas, United States and others in Mexico. Others have been found in China, Indonesia, Iraq, Italy, Japan, Oman, Russian Federation, and Tunisia.

== Species ==
- Waagenoceras dieneri
- Waagenoceras mojsisovicsi
- Waagenoceras nikitini
- Waagenoceras obliquum
- Waagenoceras richardsoni
- Waagenoceras girtyi
- Waagenoceras stachei
