= Wayan Formation =

Stratigraphic Unit in Idaho

- Stratigraphic range: Albian-Cenomanian; 100.6–97.8 Ma
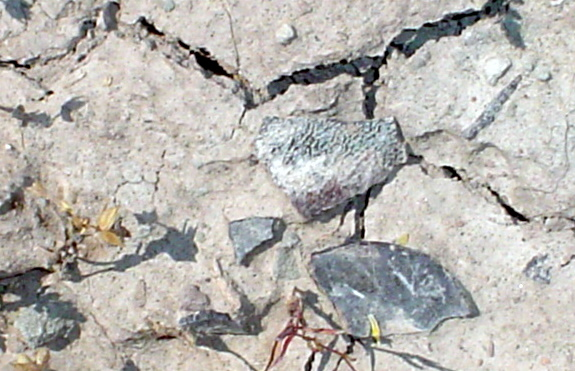
- Eggshell of the oogenus Macroelongatoolithus on a Wayan Formation outcrop. Image used courtesy of the USFS Paleontology Program
- Type: Geological formation
- Underlies: Sage Junction Formation
- Overlies: Smiths Formation
- Thickness: 1,344 m (4,409 ft) in western Tincup Canyon area, Caribou County

Lithology
- Primary: Mudstone, sandstone
- Other: Conglomerates, limestone & tuff

Location
- Region: Idaho
- Country: United States
- Extent: Caribou Range

The Wayan Formation is a geological formation in Idaho whose strata date back to the latest Early Cretaceous and the earliest Late Cretaceous. Dinosaur, other reptile, mammal, and micro and macro-floral remains are among the fossils that have been recovered from the formation. The lack of extensive outcrops, limited geographic extent, and extreme structural deformation have limited paleontological explorations of the Wayan.

== Geology and age ==
The Wayan occurs in the Caribou Range of eastern Idaho. Sediments are dominantly floodplain mudstones (many having undergone extensive pedogenic processes) with some fluvial sandstones and minor conglomerates, limestones, and tuffs. Carbonate nodules in pedogenic mudstones suggest a semi-arid, seasonal climate during deposition. Radiometric U-Pb dates from detrital zircons indicate a latest Albian to early to middle Cenomanian age. Detrital zircon U-Pb dating within one stratigraphic meter of an Oryctodromeus locality yielded an age of 99.1 +1.5/-1.3 Ma showing proximity to the Albian/Cenomanian stage boundary.

The Wayan is equivalent to the upper Cedar Mountain Formation of Utah, the Aspen Shale of Wyoming, and the Vaughn member of the Blackleaf Formation of Montana.

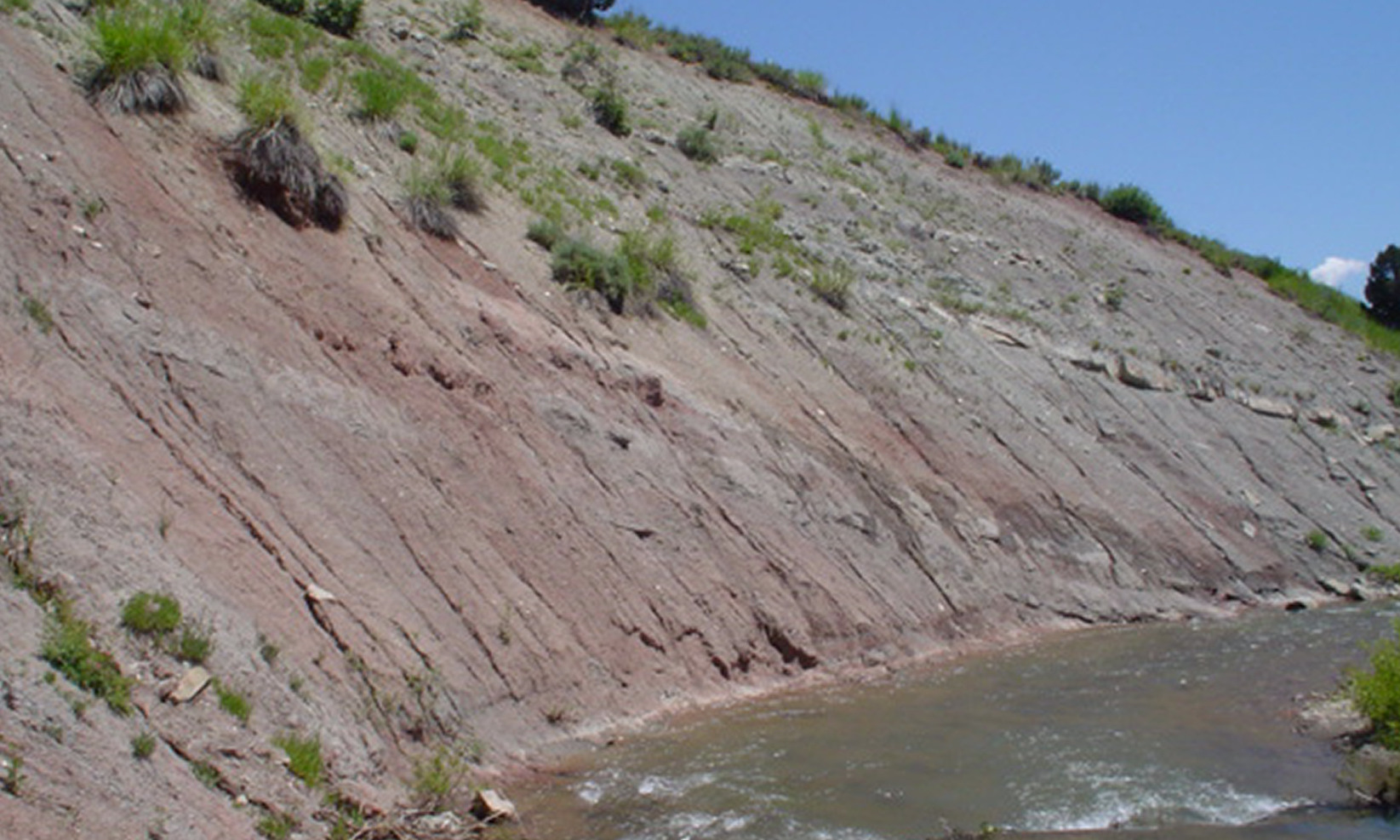
Outcrop of the Wayan Formation

== Fauna and flora ==
The vertebrate fauna is dominated by the small basal ornithopod Oryctodromeus, which dominates the vertebrate assemblage and is known from several partial skeletons. An ankylosaur, a Tenontosaurus-like iguanodontid, a hadrosaurid, dromaeosaurs, a tyrannosauroid, a possible neovenatorid allosauroid, a giant oviraptorosaur (represented by eggshell of the oogenus Macroelongatoolithus carleylei), indeterminate small theropods, possible neoceratopsians, large and small crocodilians, turtles, a variety of small mammals, and semionotid fish are known from very fragmentary remains.

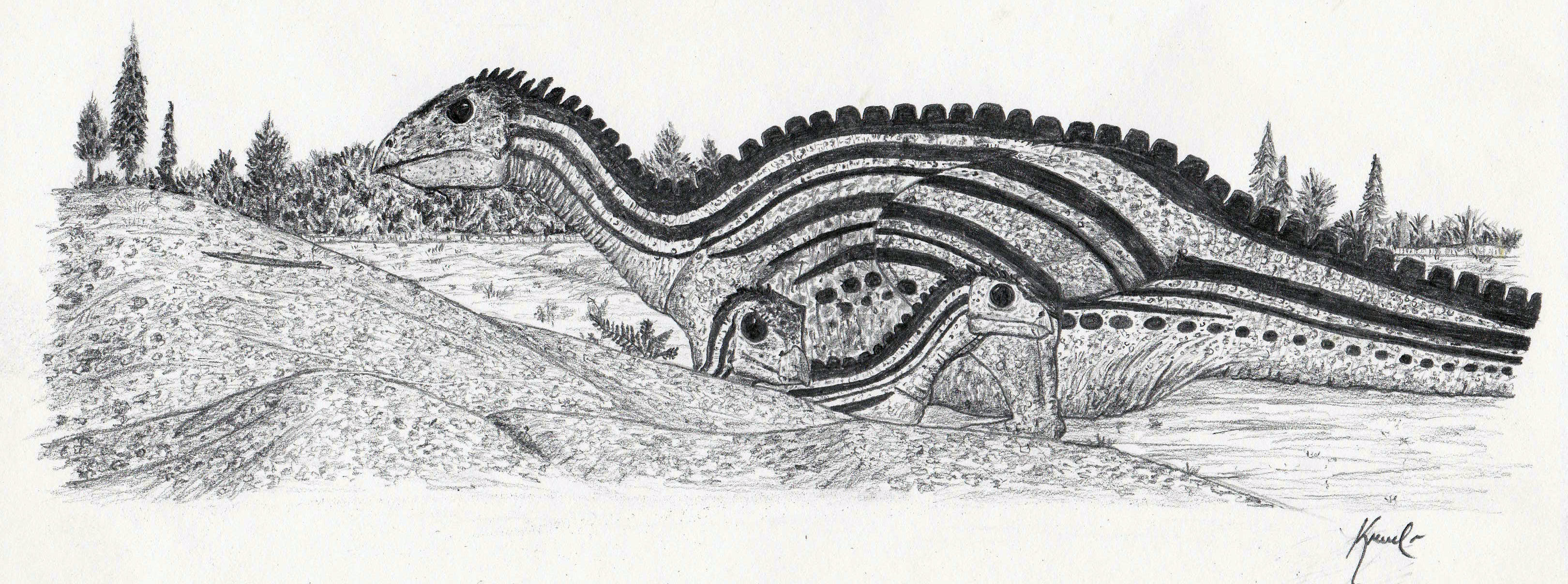
An Oryctodromeus family on the Cenomanian floodplains of Idaho. Artwork by L. Krumenacker.

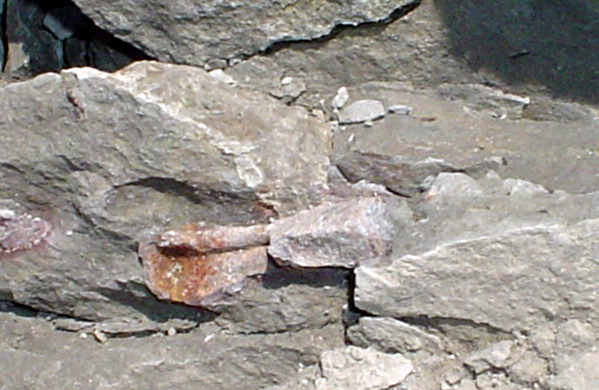
Distal caudal vertebra of Oryctodromeus in-situ in the Wayan Formation. Image used courtesy of the USFS Paleontology Program

Fossil plants are rare, but petrified conifer wood, and foliage from angiosperms, conifers and ferns has been reported.

== Vertebrate fauna ==
- Cf. Semionotidae
- Eutriconodont mammal known from a tooth
- Multituberculate mammals known from teeth
- Metatherian mammal known from tooth
- Chelonia known from shell fragments.
- Crocodylians known from teeth and partial skulls.
- Oryctodromeus sp. known from numerous partial skeletons
- Indeterminate Tenontosaurus-like iguanodontid known from teeth
- Hadrosaurid known from teeth
- Ornithopoda indet.known from isolated skeletal elements
- Ankylosaur, probably nodosaurid known from partial skeleton and isolated elements.
- Neoceratopsia indet. known from associated elements
- Dromaeosaurs known from isolated teeth
- Tyrannosauroid known from an isolated tooth
- Tyrannosauroid similar to Moros and Suskityrannus, known from the proximal half of a femur
- Possible neovenatorid allosauroid known from an isolated juvenile vertebra
- Unknown small theropods known from isolated bones and teeth
- Giant oviraptorosaur known from eggs and abundant eggshell of Macroelongatoolithus carleylei.
- Large Allosaurus-size theropod, possibly piscivorous, known from isolated teeth

== Macroflora ==
- Gleichenia
- Anemia
- Angiospermae unidet.
- Coniferae unidet.

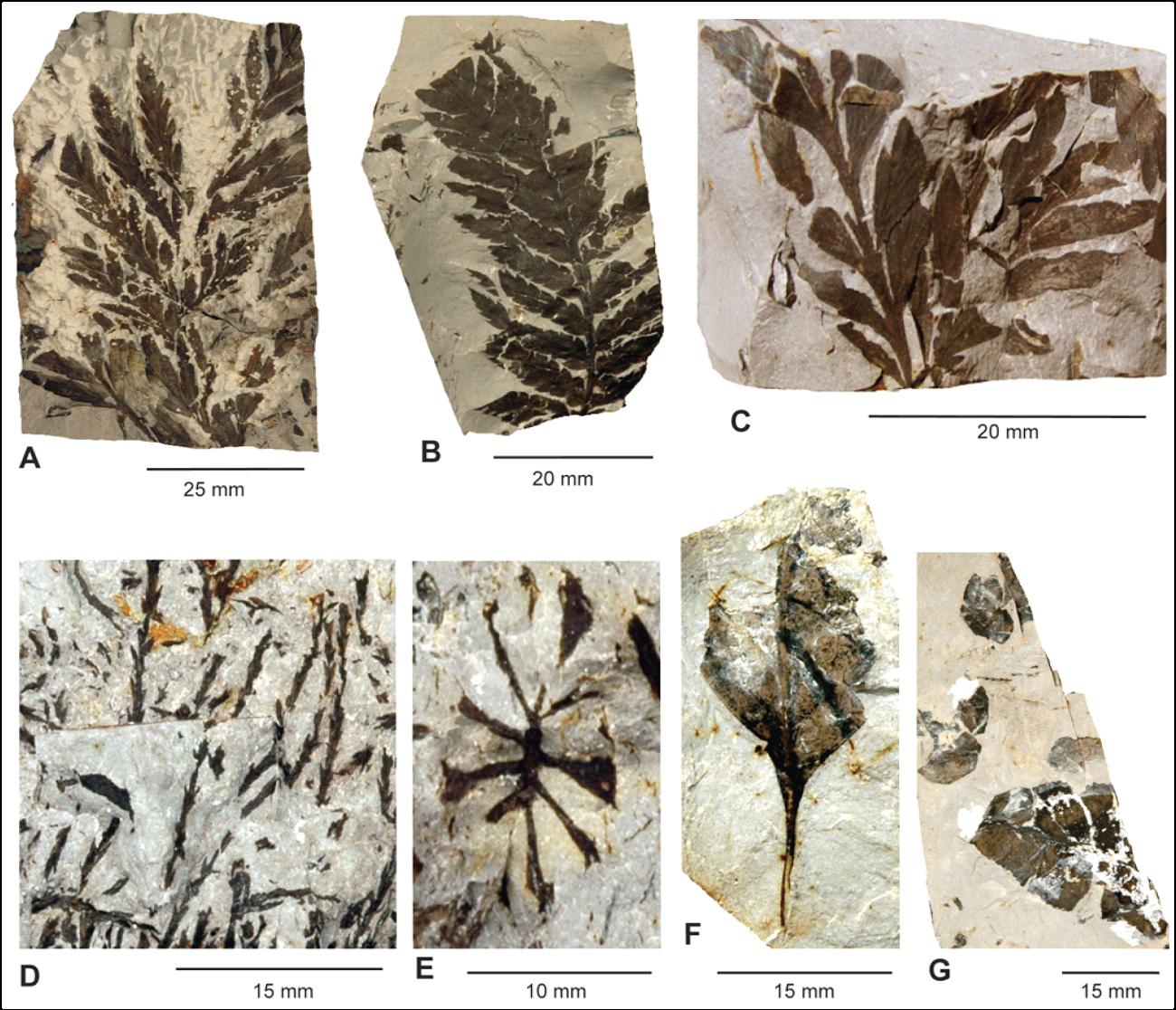
Fossil foliage from the Wayan Formation. The ferns Gleichenia (A,B) and Anemaia (C). Conifer foliage (D) and cone (E). Angiosperm leaves (F, G). Notice drip point on F.

== Taphonomy ==
Taphonomic modes of the Wayan are distinct. Fossiliferous 'pods' of Oryctodromeus skeletons and skeletal elements, sometimes with more than one individual represented, are the most common occurrence of vertebrate skeletal remains. Degrees of association and articulation range from fully articulated individuals to articulated strings of vertebrae and articulate limbs associated with other elements. These Oryctodromeus remains exhibit no appreciable pre-burial taphonomic modifications such as weathering, abrasion, breakage, or tooth marks. This combination of observations suggests the possibility of burial of these animals within unrecognized burrows.

Excluding eggshell, almost all other vertebrate remains known from the Wayan occur as isolated teeth and partial to complete bones found in high energy fluvial lag and possible debris flow deposits. These remains exhibit a more typical range of taphonomic modification with varying degrees of abrasion and breakage typical of skeletal remains preserved in fluvial deposits. The overall fossil assemblage of the Wayan and patterns of preservation suggest that surface processes on the Wayan floodplains were less conducive to preservation, with preservation typically occurring subsurface and in fluvial channels.

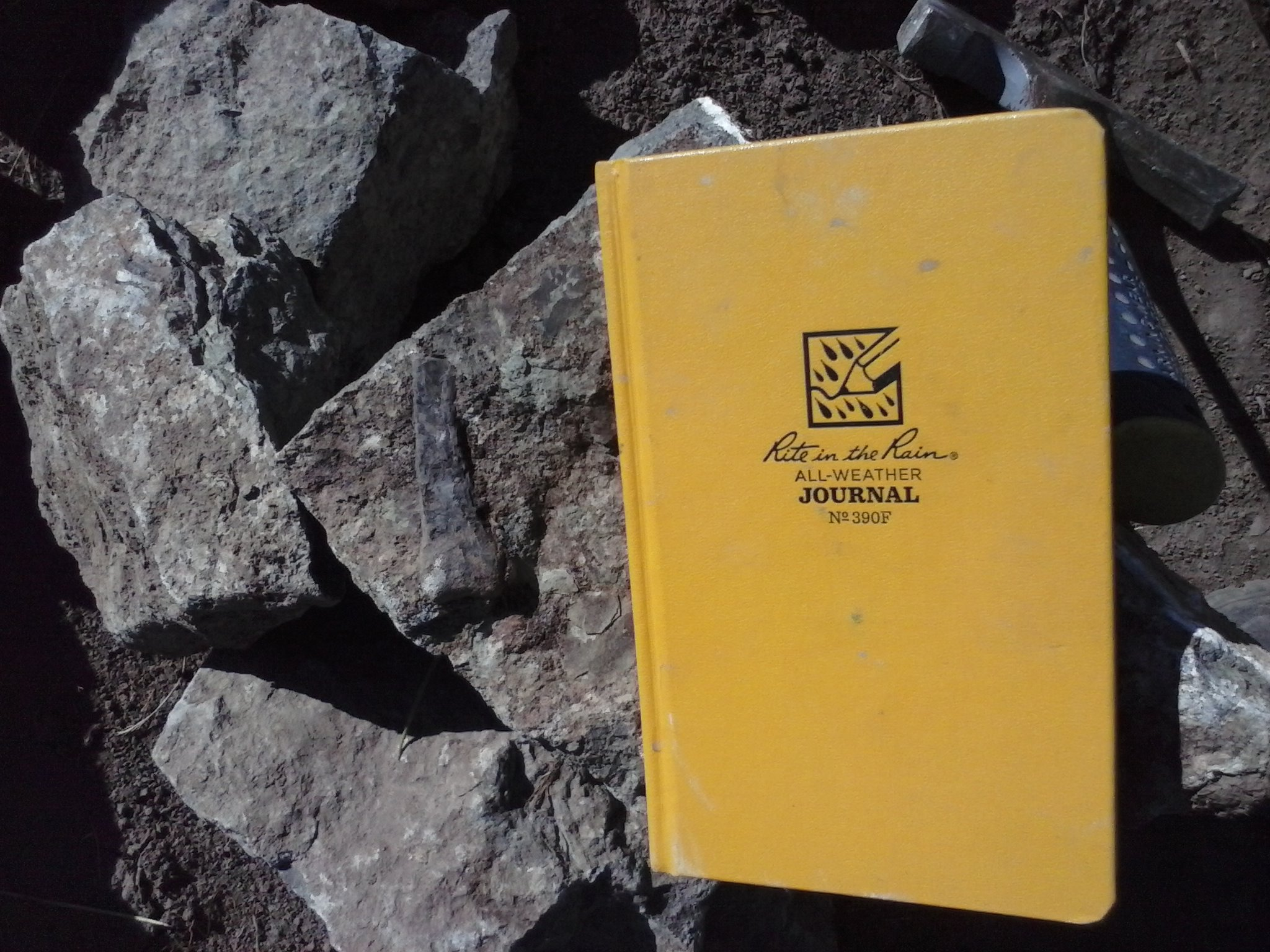
Partial metatarsal from Oryctodromeus recovered from a possible debris flow or fluvial lag in a Wayan Formation outcrop. Image used courtesy of the USFS Paleontology Program

== See also ==
- List of dinosaur-bearing rock formations
