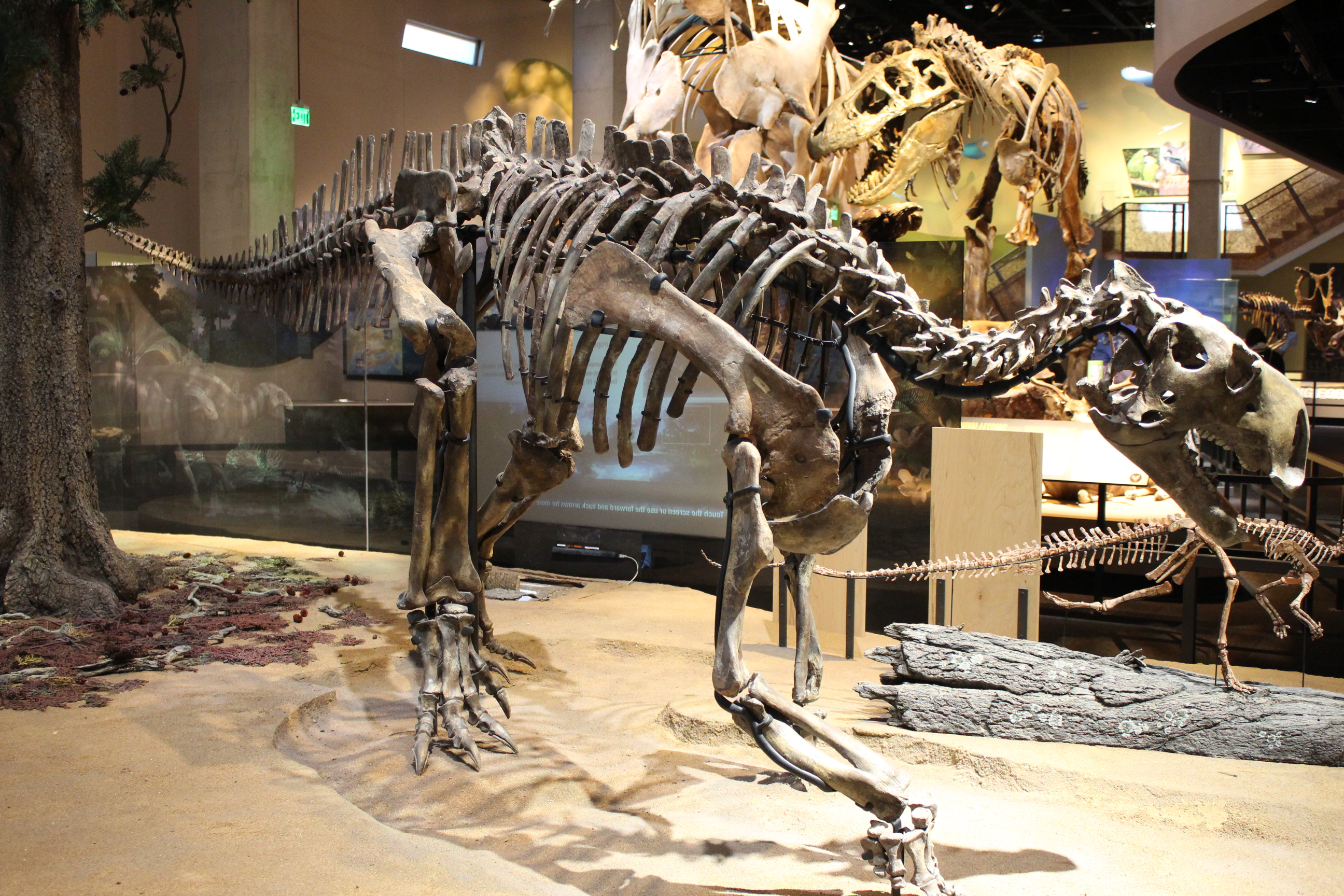
- T. dossi on exhibit in the Perot Museum of Nature and Science

Scientific classification
- Kingdom: Animalia
- Phylum: Chordata
- Class: Reptilia
- Clade: Dinosauria
- Clade: †Ornithischia
- Clade: †Ornithopoda
- Clade: †Tenontosauridae
- Genus: †Tenontosaurus; Ostrom, 1970

Species
- †T. tilletti Ostrom, 1970 (type); †T. dossi Winkler, Murry & Jacobs, 1997

= Tenontosaurus =

Tenontosaurus Temporal range: Early Cretaceous (Aptian to Albian), 115–108 Ma

Extinct genus of dinosaurs

Tenontosaurus (/tɪˌnɒntəˈsɔːrəs/ ti-NON-tə-SOR-əs; lit. 'sinew lizard') is a genus of iguanodontian ornithopod dinosaur. It had an unusually long, broad tail, which like its back was stiffened with a network of bony tendons. The genus is known from the late Aptian to Albian ages of the Early Cretaceous period sediments of western North America, dating between 115 and 108 million years ago. It contains two species, Tenontosaurus tilletti (described by John Ostrom in 1970) and Tenontosaurus dossi (described by Winkler, Murry, and Jacobs in 1997). Many specimens of T. tilletti have been collected from several geological formations throughout western North America. T. dossi is known from only a handful of specimens collected from the Twin Mountains Formation of Parker County, Texas.

== History of discovery ==
The first Tenontosaurus fossil was found in Big Horn County, Montana by an American Museum of Natural History (AMNH) expedition in 1903. Subsequent digs in the same area during the 1930s, spearheaded by Barnum Brown and Roland T. Bird, unearthed 18 more specimens. Four more were recovered during the 1940s: two by a team from the University of Oklahoma, and two by a private collector, Al Silberling, operating on the behalf of Princeton University. Despite the large number of fossil specimens, the animal was not named or scientifically described during this time, though Barnum Brown gave it the informal name "Tenantosaurus", "sinew lizard", in reference to the extensive system of stiffening tendons in its back and tail.

Starting in 1962, Yale University conducted an extensive, five-year-long dig in the Big Horn Basin area (Cloverly Formation) of Montana and Wyoming. The expedition was led by John Ostrom, whose team discovered more than 40 new specimens of the taxon recovered by Brown. Following his expedition, in 1970, Ostrom published a review of the fauna and geology of the Cloverly Formation. In that paper, he scientifically described Brown's taxon, calling it Tenontosaurus tilletti. The genus name has the same etymology as the informal "Tenantosaurus" name; the species name refers to the Lloyd Tillett family, who provided field parties from Yale with assistance and hospitality throughout their expeditions. The type specimen of T. tilletti, as designated by Ostrom, was AMNH 3040.

Since 1970, many more Tenontosaurus specimens have been reported, both from the Cloverly and other geological formations, including the Antlers Formation in Oklahoma, Paluxy Formation of Texas, Wayan Formation of Idaho, Cedar Mountain Formation of Utah, and Arundel Formation of Maryland. In 1997, remains from the Twin Mountains Formation of Texas were assigned to a new species of Tenontosaurus, T. dossi, named after the Doss Ranch site. In 2025, Tenontosaurus were unearthed from the Yucca Formation in Texas.

== Description ==
=== Size ===
Tenontosaurus tilletti (red) compared in size to a human and other ornithopods

Tenontosaurus was a medium-sized ornithopod, with both species weighing about 1,000 kilograms (2,200 lb). Gregory S. Paul in 2016 estimated that T. tilletti would have been 6 metres (20 ft) and weighed 600 kilograms (1,300 lb), but Nicolás E. Campione and David C. Evans in 2020 estimated that this species would have weighed up to 971–1,019 kilograms (2,141–2,247 lb). Paul also estimated that T. dossi would have been 7 meters (23 ft) long and weighed 1,000 kilograms (2,200 lb). The original describers of T. dossi favoured a length estimate of 7 and 8 metres (23 and 26 ft), and the same estimate has been given elsewhere.

=== Skull ===
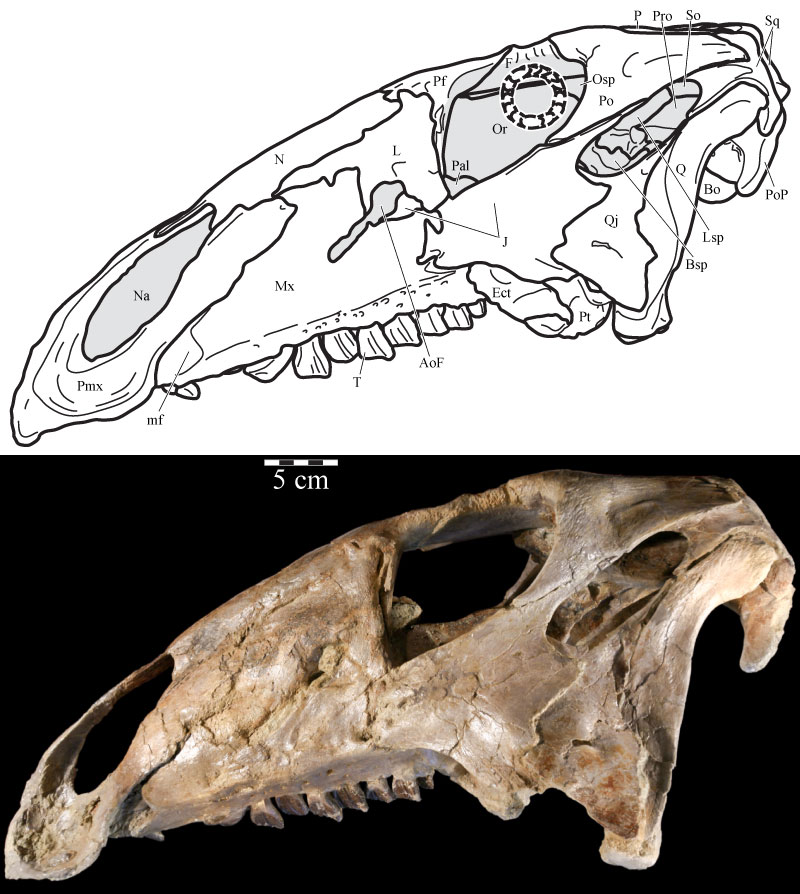
Left lateral view of the skull of OMNH 58340 (schematic above, photograph below)

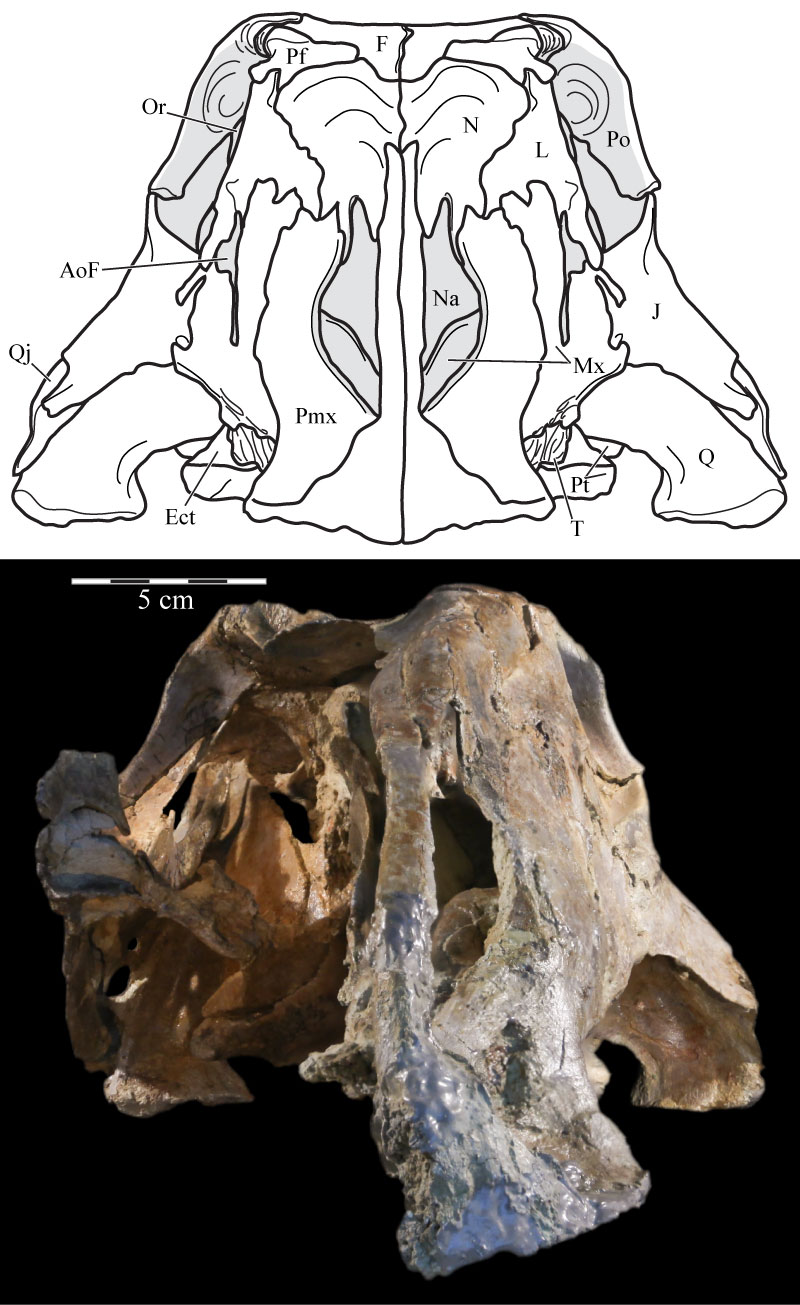
Left lateral view of the skull of OMNH 58340 (restored schematic above, photograph below)

The skull of Tenontosaurus was originally described by Ostrom as being very long and deep compared to taxa such as Theiophytalia (then considered a species of Camptosaurus). While this is true, Ostrom's reconstruction of the skull exaggerated the overall depth of the skull, leading to one which more closely resembles that of Hypsilophodon. The external nares (nostril openings) of Tenontosaurus were very large, and were almost entirely encircled by the premaxillae. The premaxillae flared inferiorly (towards the bottom), forming a thick, U-shaped beak, characteristic of iguanodontians. The beak extended as far back as the anterior (front) process of the maxilla. The single longest bone in Tenontosaurus' skull is the vomer, which stretches from the middle of the beak to the very back of the orbital cavity (eye socket). The maxilla was larger in general, though, comprising the majority of the rostrum and housing all of the upper teeth. The maxilla was divided into two components: a facial lamina, which comprised its lateral (outer) surface, and a dental ridge. In more derived iguanodontians, and Theiophytalia, the maxilla was bordered by a lateral process of the jugal relatively far forward; in Tenontosaurus, however, the facial laminae of the maxillas overlapped with the jugals, and almost contacted the inferior part of the lacrimal bone. T. tilletti had a long and narrow antorbital fenestra, which extended down from the lacrimals to the facial laminae; T. dossi, meanwhile, had a relatively small one, surrounded by a shallow fossa. Similarly, the dorsal (upper) process of T. dossi's maxilla did not expand posteriorly above the antorbital fenestra, as it did in T. tilletti. The process connecting the quadratojugal to the jugal was structured in a way that formed an additional temporal fenestra, which Ostrom presumed related to jaw adductor muscles. A similar fenestra is also seen in Hypsilophodon. The orbit was roughly triangular, and was larger than the fenestrae anterior to (in front of) or posterior to (behind) it. The majority of the occipital condyle in Tenontosaurus was made up of a large basioccipital, though this structure was almost entirely excluded from the occipital surface itself. Ostrom noted similarities between the shapes of the paroccipitals in Tenontosaurus and in hadrosaurs, namely their hooked shape and their orientation in relation to the foramen magnum. The ventral flange of the pterygoid was broad and deep, particularly enlarged dorsally, providing a larger attachment site for parts of the pterygoid muscles. The quadrate was narrow, and was essentially vertical.

==== Lower jaw ====
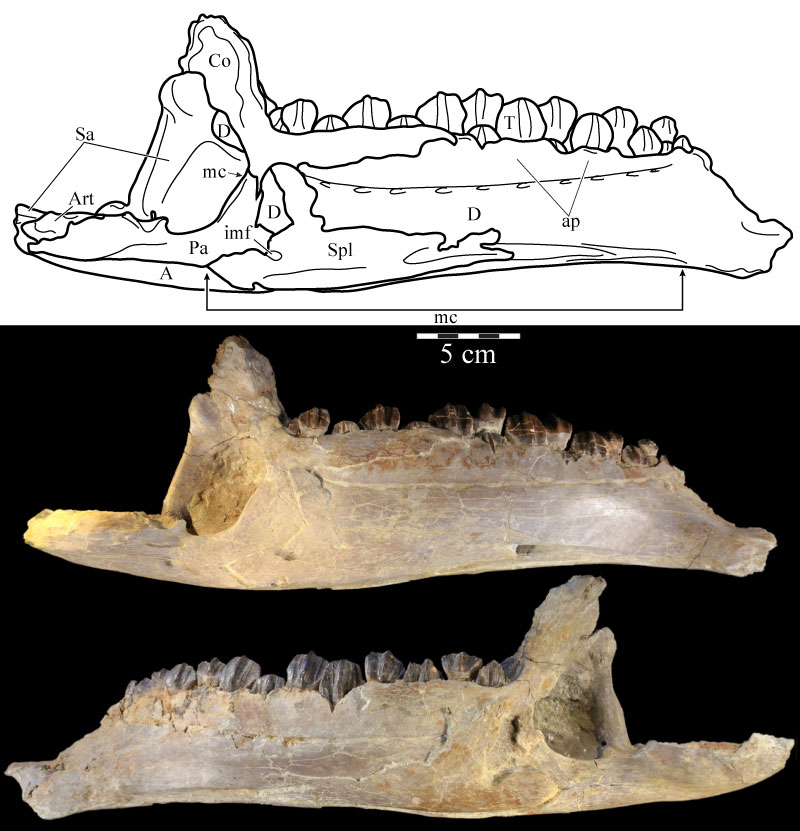
Schematic (above) and photographs (middle and below) of the mandible of OMNH 58340

Tenontosaurus' mandible (lower jaw) was described by Ostrom as being "of moderate length and robustness". It terminated in a predentary bone, a structure found uniquely among ornithischians which formed the lower beak. The predentary in Tenontosaurus was horseshoe-shaped and was lined with projecting serrations, referred to as pseudo-teeth, or as denticles. They likely served, at least partly, as anchors for the keratinous portion of the beak. Such structures are present in many ornithischians, save for taxa such as Dryosaurus or Zalmoxes. In at least T. dossi, the predentary had a process on its ventral (bottom) surface which overlapped with the mandibular symphyses. The dentaries (the tooth-bearing portions of the lower jaw) were robust. There were two distinct coronoid processes to the mandibles. The retroarticular processes, projections at the back of each mandibular ramus, were long and curved. Ostrom noted that the surangulars likely formed most of the lateral surface of the mandible at the level of the coronoid process and beyond, though was not able to confirm this due to the condition of the material at his disposal; this was later confirmed. The surangulars also formed the lateral part of the retoarticular processes.

==== Dentition ====
All of Tenontosaurus' teeth were enameled unilaterally (on only one side, that being medially, or on the inside). The maxillary teeth bore a series of ridges, subequal in length, running along their surface in a non-parallel arrangement. Those of the dentary lacked these ridges, instead bearing prominent vertical keels on their inner surfaces.

=== Postcranial skeleton ===
Life reconstruction of T. tilletti

Tenontosaurus was a facultative quadruped, capable of assuming either a bipedal or quadrupedal stance. It may have used a quadrupedal stance while feeding, but was probably incapable of rapid quadrupedal movement. Tenontosaurus resembles quadrupedal ornithischians in having a tibia that is shorter than the femur and an anterolateral process on the ulna, but it resembles bipedal ornithischians in having a relatively narrow pelvis and a pendant fourth trochanter. The manus (the hand/front foot) shows a mixture of traits associated with bipeds and quadrupeds. It retains narrow claws, unlike the hoof-like unguals of quadrupedal ornithischians, has a short metacarpus, as in the bipedal Hypsilophodon, and retains grasping adaptations. However, the phalanges are also shortened as an adaptation to weight bearing. An analysis of the overall proportions and center of mass of Tenontosaurus found it to be a quadruped, although the analysis only distinguished bipeds from quadrupeds without including a facultatively bipedal category.

== Classification ==
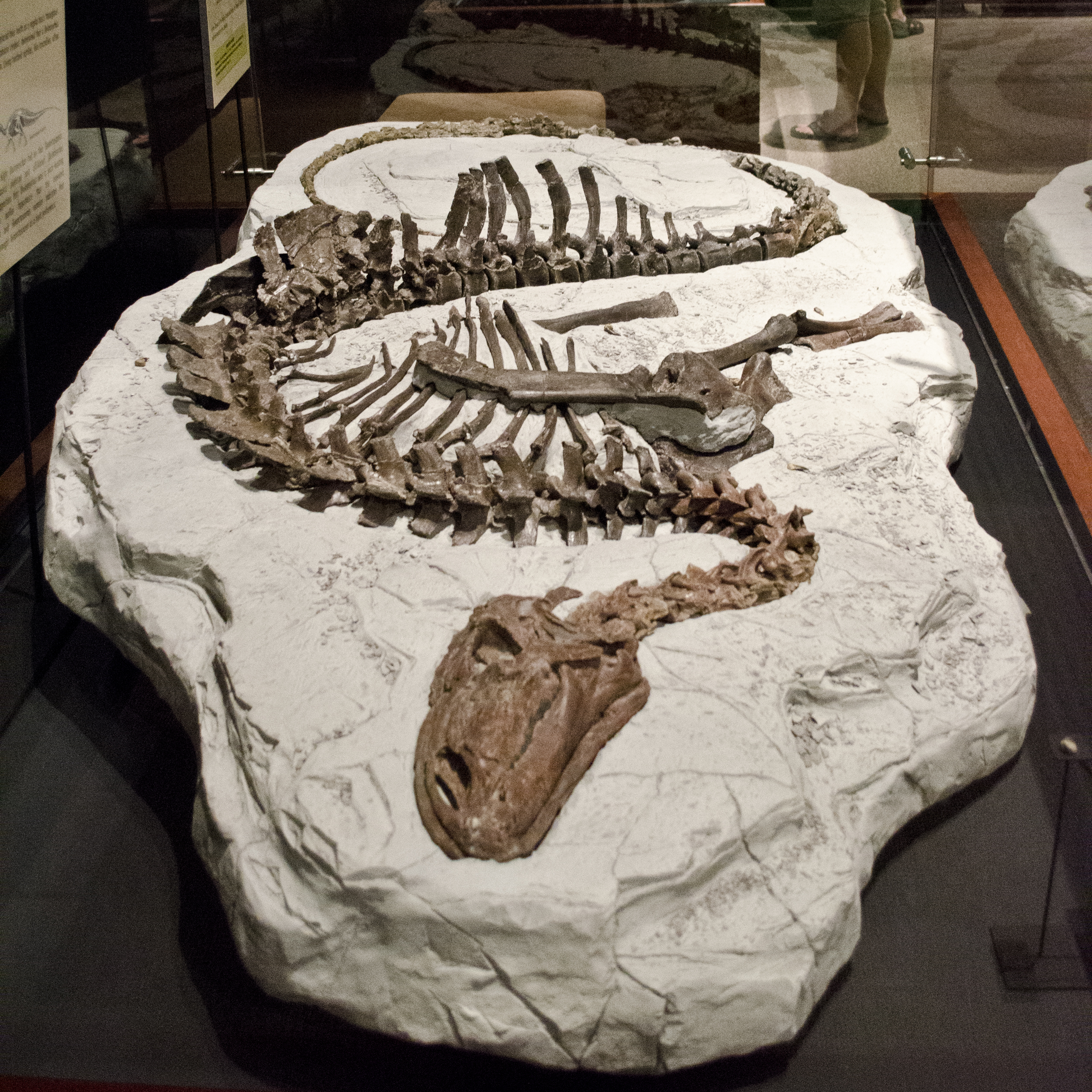
Front part of skeleton

Tenontosaurus was originally classified in the family Iguanodontidae, although subsequent authors challenged this classification and proposed it actually belonged to Hypsilophodontidae. Subsequent phylogenetic analyses have found Tenontosaurus to be intermediate in position between Hypsilophodon-like taxa and Iguanodon-like taxa, as a non-dryomorph iguanodont. The precise phylogenetic position of Tenontosaurus varies between studies, with some studies finding it to be more closely related to dryomorphs than rhabdodontids, some studies finding it to be the sister taxon of a clade uniting rhabdodontids and dryomorphs.

The cladogram below follows an analysis by Butler et al., 2011.

- Ornithopoda
  - Orodromeus
  - Hypsilophodon
  - Zephyrosaurus
  - Yandusaurus
  - - Changchunsaurus
    - Jeholosaurus
  - - - Gasparinisaura
      - Parksosaurus
    - - - Bugenasaura
        - Thescelosaurus
      - Iguanodontia
        - Talenkauen
        - - Anabisetia
          - - Rhabdodontidae
            - - Tenontosaurus
                - T. tilletti
                - T. dossi
              - Dryomorpha
                - Dryosauridae
                - Ankylopollexia (including Iguanodon, hadrosaurids, and others)

The description of Iani in 2023 lent support for a close relationship between Tenontosaurus and rhabdodontids, as Iani exhibits transitional characteristics between Tenontosaurus and other rhabdodontomorphs. This result was supported by two datasets.

Topology 1: Poole (2022) dataset

- Rhabdodontomorpha
  - Muttaburrasaurus
  - - - Iani
      - Tenontosaurus
        - T. dossi
        - T. tilletti
    - - Rhabdodon
      - - Zalmoxes shqiperorum
        - Zalmoxes robustus

Topology 2: Dieudonné et al. (2021) dataset

- Rhabdodontomorpha
  - Tenontosaurus
    - T. dossi
    - T. tilletti
  - - Iani
    - - - Rhabdodon sp1
        - Rhabdodon priscus
      - - - Zalmoxes shqiperorum
          - Zalmoxes robustus
        - - - Mochlodon vorosi
            - Mochlodon suessi
          - - Transylvanosaurus
            - - Foskeia ('Vegagete ornithopod')
              - - Muttaburrasaurus
                - - Fostoria

A similar result was recovered by Fonseca et al. (2024), who found Iani, Tenontosaurus, and also Convolosaurus to form the new family Tenontosauridae within the Rhabdodontomorpha, defined in the PhyloCode as "the largest clade containing Tenontosaurus tilletti, but not Hypsilophodon foxii, Iguanodon bernissartensis, and Rhabdodon priscus". This family may have represented an early North American radiation of the Rhabdodontomorpha.

== Paleobiology ==
=== Diet ===
Plant life in the Tenontosaurus ecosystem was likely dominated by ferns and tree ferns, cycads, and possibly primitive flowering plants. Larger plants and trees were represented by gymnosperms, such as conifer and ginkgo trees. Tenontosaurus was a low browser, and an adult would have had a maximum browsing height of about 3 meters (10 ft) if it adopted a bipedal stance. This restricted Tenontosaurus, especially juveniles, to eating low-growing ferns and shrubs. Its powerful, U-shaped beak and the angled cutting surfaces of its teeth, however, meant it was not limited to which part of the plant it consumed. Leaves, wood, and even fruit may have formed part of its diet.

=== Predators ===
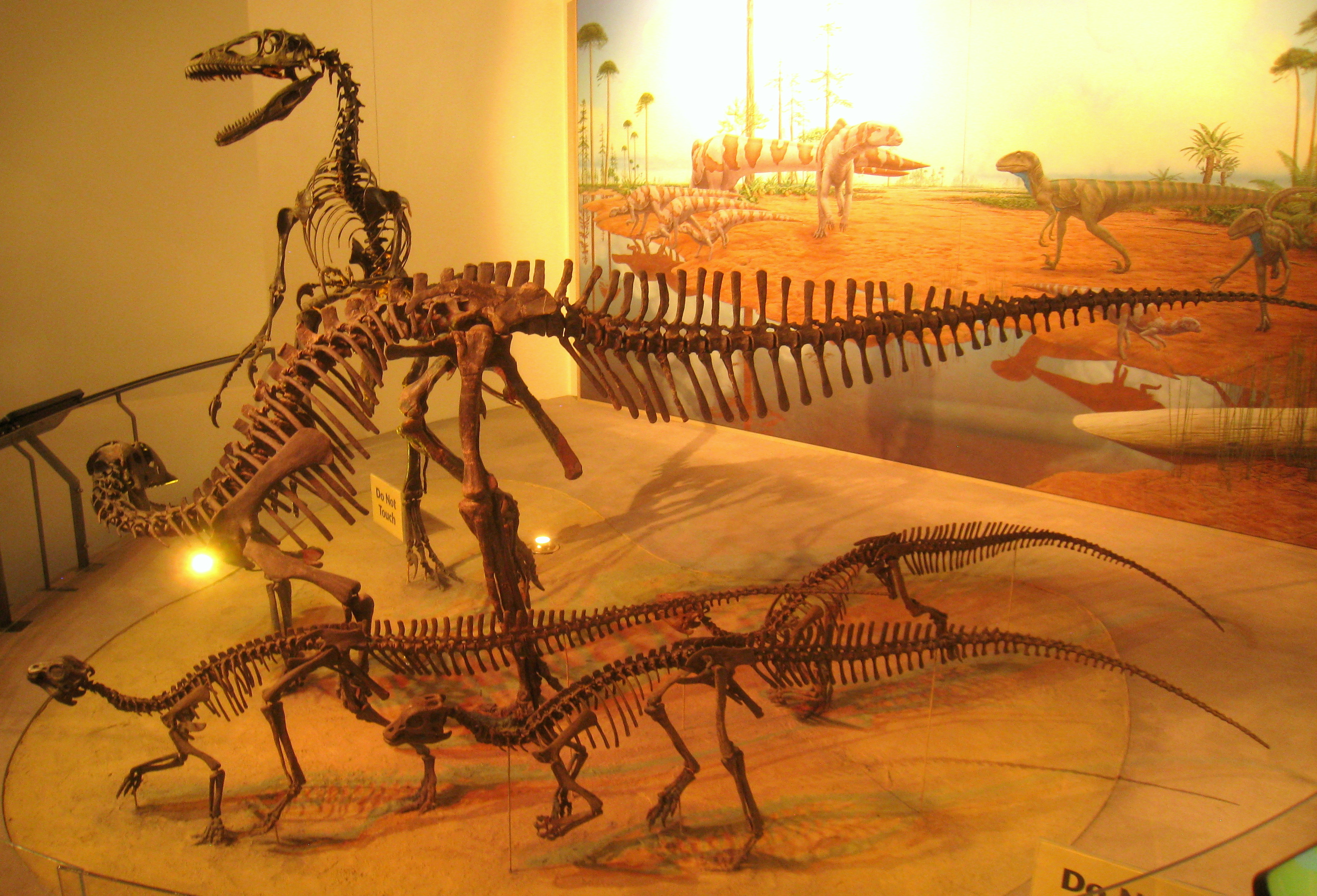
T. tilletti with juveniles, in front of Deinonychus

Teeth and a number of skeletons belonging to the carnivorous theropod Deinonychus have often been discovered associated with Tenontosaurus tilletti remains. Tenontosaurus specimens have been found at over 50 sites, and 14 of those also contain Deinonychus remains. According to one 1995 study, only six sites containing Deinonychus fossils contain no trace of Tenontosaurus, and Deinonychus remains are only rarely found associated with other potential prey, like Sauropelta. In all, 20% of Tenontosaurus fossils are found in close proximity to Deinonychus, and several scientists have suggested that this implies Deinonychus was the major predator of Tenontosaurus. Adult Deinonychus, however, were much smaller than adult Tenontosaurus, and it is unlikely a single Deinonychus would have been capable of attacking a fully grown Tenontosaurus. While some scientists have suggested that Deinonychus must therefore have been a pack hunter, this view has been challenged based on both a supposed lack of evidence for coordinated hunting (rather than mobbing behavior as in most modern birds and reptiles, though crocodilians have been documented to hunt cooperatively on occasion) as well as evidence that Deinonychus may have been cannibalizing each other, as well as the Tenontosaurus, in a feeding frenzy. It is likely that Deinonychus favored juvenile Tenontosaurus, and that when Tenontosaurus reached a certain size, it passed out of range as a food source for the small theropods, though they may have scavenged larger individuals, or preyed on adults that were sick or injured. The fact that most Tenontosaurus remains found with Deinonychus are half-grown individuals supports this view. It also lived in the same area as the large carnivorous dinosaur Acrocanthosaurus.

=== Reproduction ===
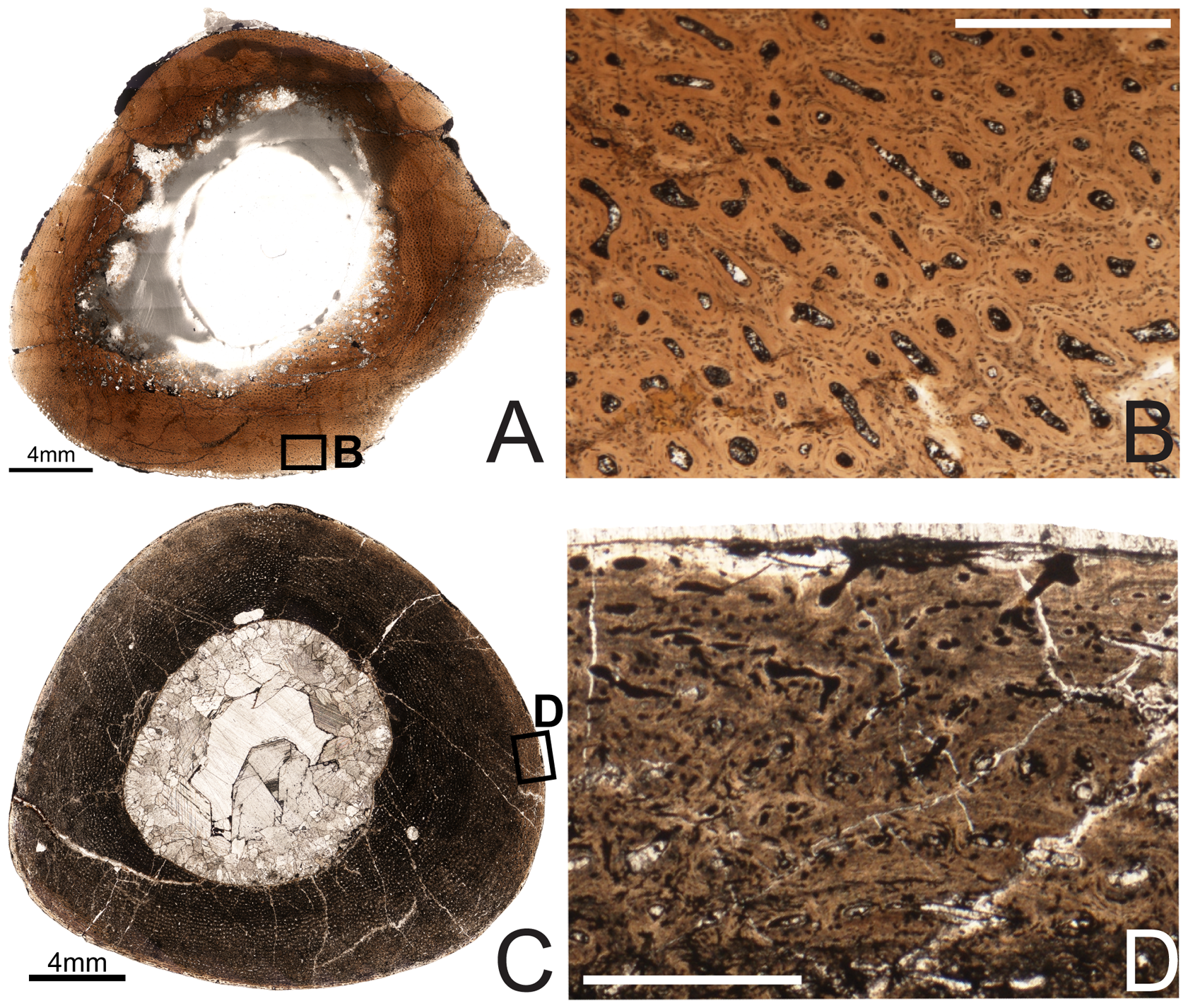
Osteohistology of the diaphyseal femur of two juveniles

The presence of medullary bone tissue in the thigh bone and shin bone of one specimen indicates that Tenontosaurus used this tissue, today only found in birds that are laying eggs, in reproduction. Additionally, like Tyrannosaurus and Allosaurus, two other dinosaurs known to have produced medullary bone, the tenontosaur individual was not at full adult size upon her death at 8 years old. Because the theropod line of dinosaurs that includes Allosaurus and Tyrannosaurus diverged from the line that led to Tenontosaurus very early in the evolution of dinosaurs, this suggests that dinosaurs in general produced medullary tissue and reached reproductive maturity before maximum size. A histological study showed that T. tilletti grew quickly early in life and during sub-adult ontogeny, but grew very slowly in the years approaching maturity, unlike other iguanodontians.

== Paleoecology ==
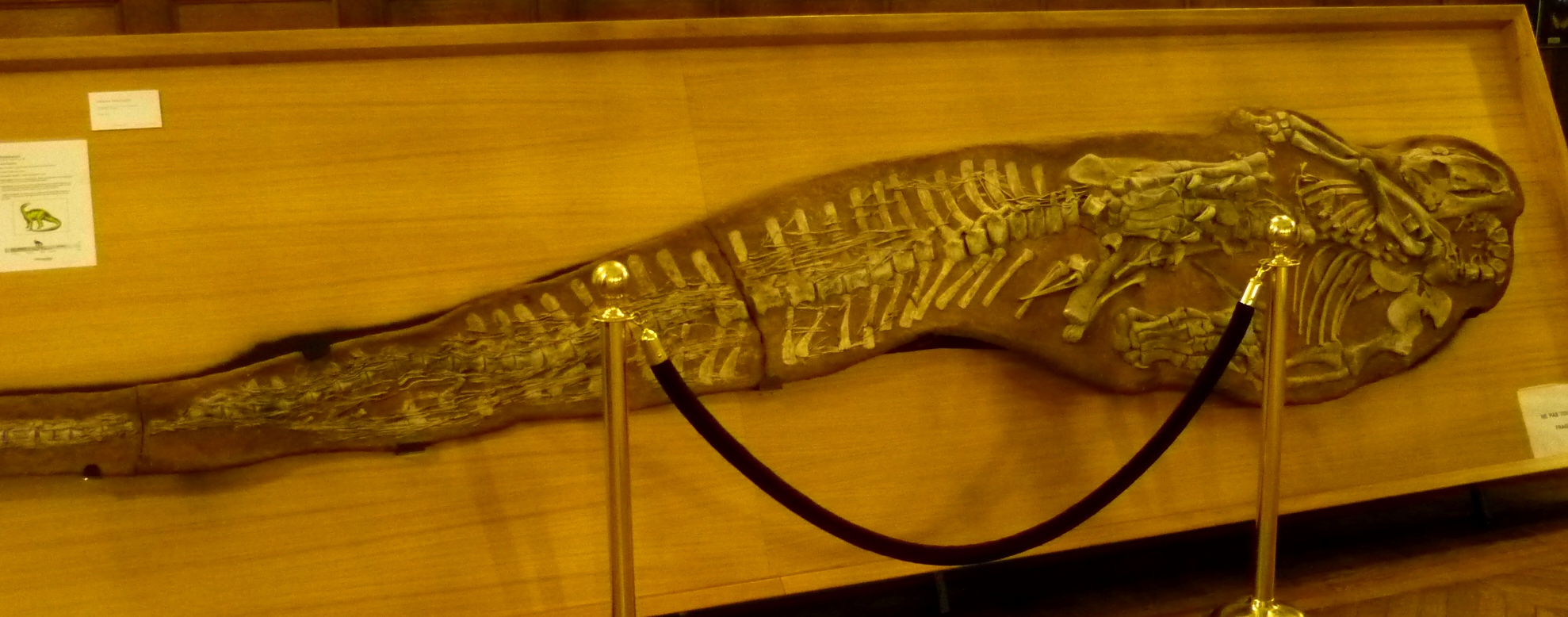
Complete fossil

Throughout the Cloverly Formation, Tenontosaurus is by far the most common vertebrate, five times more abundant than the next most common, the ankylosaur Sauropelta. In the arid Little Sheep Mudstone Member, Tenontosaurus is the only herbivorous dinosaur, and it shared its environment with the common predator Deinonychus as well as an indeterminate species of allosauroid theropod and goniopholid crocodile. After the major climate shift at the beginning of the Himes Member in the mid-Albian age, several more dinosaurs entered the region, including the less common ornithopod Zephyrosaurus, the oviraptorosaur Microvenator, and an indeterminate species of titanosauriform sauropod and ornithomimid. The ecological community in the tropical stage also included the small mammal Gobiconodon, turtles such as Glyptops, and species of lungfish.

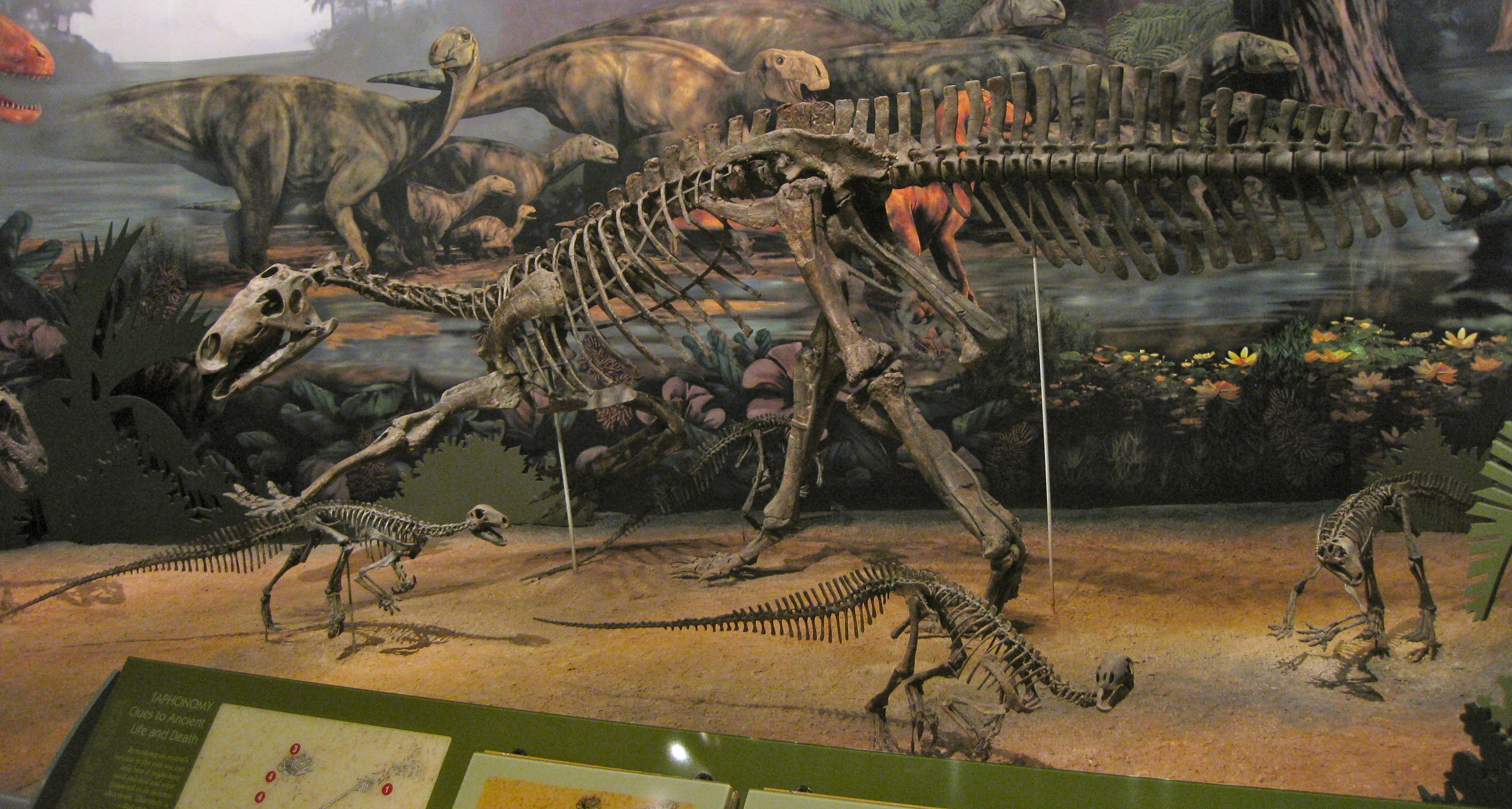
Mounted skeletons of an adult with juveniles

The ecological community was similar in other regions, with dinosaurs like Tenontosaurus and Deinonychus as the most common large vertebrates. The Antlers Formation stretches from southwest Arkansas through southeastern Oklahoma and into northeastern Texas. This geological formation has not been dated radiometrically. Scientists have used biostratigraphic data and the fact that it shares several of the same genera as the Trinity Group of Texas, to surmise that this formation was laid down during the Albian stage of the Early Cretaceous Period, approximately 110 mya. The area preserved in this formation was a large floodplain that drained into a shallow inland sea. Several million years later, this sea would expand to the north, becoming the Western Interior Seaway and dividing North America in two for nearly the entire Late Cretaceous period. The paleoenvironment of the Antlers Formation consisted of tropical or sub-tropical forests, floodplains, river deltas, coastal swamps, bayous and lagoons, probably similar to that of modern-day Louisiana. In the Antlers Formation in what is now Oklahoma, Tenontosaurus and Deinonychus shared their paleoenvironment with other dinosaurs, such as the sauropods Astrodon (Pleurocoelus) and Sauroposeidon proteles, and the carnosaur Acrocanthosaurus atokensis, which was likely the apex predator in this region. The most common dinosaur in the paleoenvironment preserved in this formation is Tenontosaurus. Other vertebrates present at the time of Tenontosaurus included the amphibian Albanerpeton arthridion, the reptiles Atokasaurus metarsiodon and Ptilotodon wilsoni, the crurotarsan reptile Bernissartia, the cartilaginous fish Hybodus buderi and Lissodus anitae, the ray-finned fish Gyronchus dumblei, the crocodilian Goniopholis, and the turtles Glyptops and Naomichelys. Possible indeterminate bird remains are also known from the Antlers Formation. The fossil evidence suggests that the gar Lepisosteus was the most common vertebrate in this region. The early mammals known from this region include Atokatherium boreni and Paracimexomys crossi.

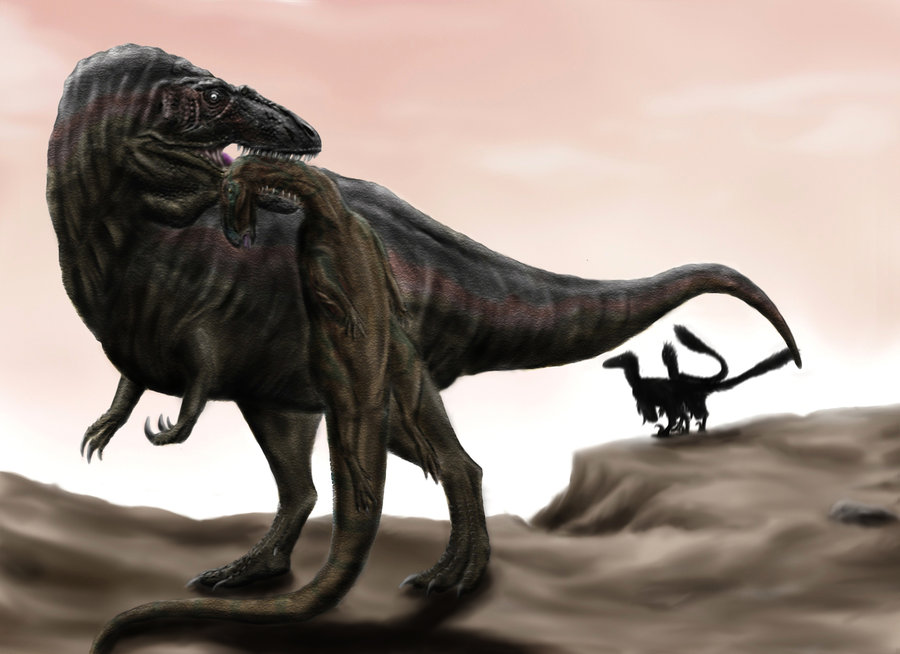
Tenontosaurus carcass being dragged away by the apex predator Acrocanthosaurus atokensis while a pair of Deinonychus antirrhopus watch.

During the Albian, much of North America was blanketed by vast forests composed of diverse plant life. The canopy was dominated by trees such as pines, redwoods, araucarians, cheirolepidiacean conifers, yews, taxodioids, athrotaxidoids, podocarps, plane trees (sycamores), magnoliales, laurales, fabids, malvids, Tempskyaceae ferns, and Cyatheales ferns. The forest floor supported a rich understory of cycads, cycadeoids, horsetails, forked ferns, spleenworts, and Osmundaceae ferns. More open areas would have been home to the fern known as Ruffordia. This wide array of plants probably kept these herbivores well fed. Possible cycad seeds were thought to have been found in the gut of Tenontosaurus individual, however these were probably mineral concretions.

=== Climate ===
In the Cloverly Formation of Montana and Wyoming, Tenontosaurus remains are common in two distinct rock units: the more ancient Little Sheep Mudstone Member (Cloverly Formation unit V) and the more recent Himes Member (units VI and VII). The oldest part of the formation, the Pryor Conglomerate, contains no Tenontosaurus fossils, and they only appear in the uppermost, most recent part of the Little Sheep Mudstone Member. Catherine Forster, in a 1984 paper on the ecology of Tenontosaurus, used this as evidence to suggest that Tenontosaurus populations did not arrive in the Bighorn Basin area until the time of the late Little Sheep Mudstone Member.

At the time Tenontosaurus first appeared in Wyoming and Montana (the early Albian age), the regions climate was arid to semi-arid, dry, with seasonal periods of rainfall and occasional droughts. However, during a period of a few million years, the climate in the region shifted to one of increased rainfall, and the environment became subtropical to tropical, with river deltas, floodplains, and forests with swampy inlets reminiscent of modern Louisiana, though marked dry seasons persisted to create savannah-like environments as well. The change in rainfall levels is likely due to the advancing shoreline of the Skull Creek Seaway, a cycle of the Western Interior Seaway which, later in the Cretaceous period, would completely divide North America.

This dramatic shift in climate coincided with an apparent increase, rather than decrease, in the abundance of Tenontosaurus. This shows Tenontosaurus to have been a remarkably adaptable animal, which persisted for a long span of time in one area despite changes to its environment.
