= Woodside Formation =

Geologic formation in Wyoming

- Stratigraphic range: Triassic
- Type: Formation
- Underlies: Ankareh Formation, Thaynes Limestone

Location
- Region: Wyoming
- Country: United States

The Woodside Formation is a geologic formation in Wyoming. It preserves fossils dating back to the Triassic period, including ripple marks, mud cracks, and raindrop imprints.

== See also ==
- List of fossiliferous stratigraphic units in Wyoming
- Paleontology in Wyoming
