= Gypsum Spring Formation =

Stratigraphical unit in the United States

- Stratigraphic range: Middle Jurassic
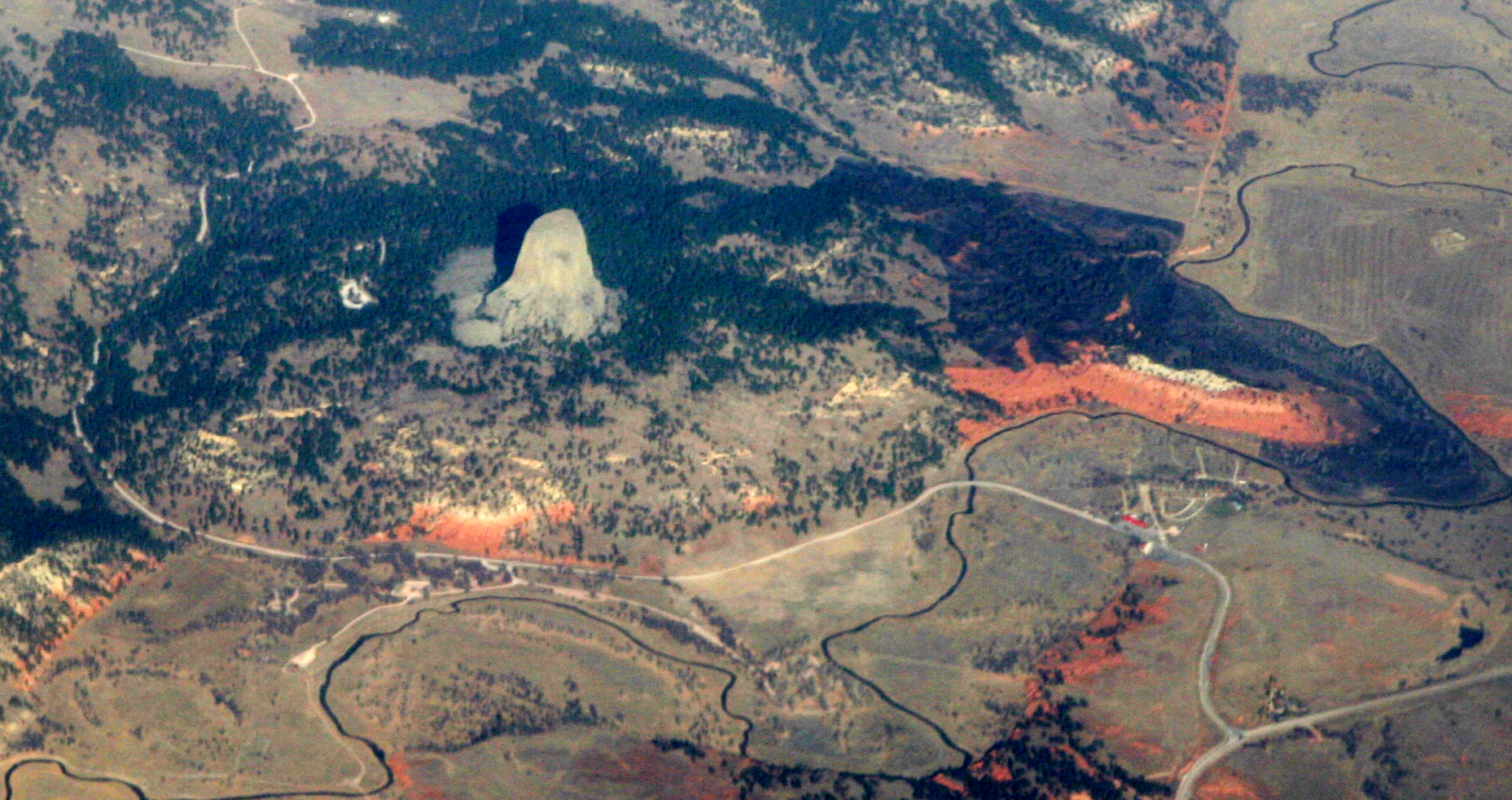
- Gypsum Spring Formation (in grey on top of red colored Spearfish Formation), near Devils Tower National Monument (Wyoming)
- Type: Geological formation
- Underlies: Sundance Formation
- Thickness: up to 76 metres (250 ft)

Lithology
- Primary: Gypsum
- Other: Shale, dolomite, limestone

Location
- Region: Williston Basin
- Country: Canada, United States

Type section
- Named for: Gypsum Spring, Wyoming
- Named by: J.D. Love, 1939

The Gypsum Spring Formation is a stratigraphical unit of Middle Jurassic age in the Williston Basin.

It takes the name from Gypsum Spring in Wyoming, and was first described in outcrop in Freemont County by J.D. Love in 1939.

== Lithology ==
The Gypsum Spring Formation is composed of massive white gypsum in the lower part, and alternating gypsum, red shale, dolomite and limestone.

== Distribution ==
The Gypsum Spring Formation reaches a maximum thickness of 76 metres (250 ft) in central Wyoming. It occurs from the Black Hills in South Dakota through Wyoming and into southern Saskatchewan.

== Relationship to other units ==
It is equivalent to the upper part of the Watrous Formation and the lower part of the Gravelbourg Formation in Saskatchewan.
