= Dewars Farm Quarry =

Location of fossil footprints in England

Coordinates: 51.919°N 1.217°W

Dewars Farm Quarry is a limestone quarry in Oxfordshire, England, between Ardley and Middleton Stoney in which extensive tracks of dinosaur footprints were found in 2024. The quarry excavates a layer of limestone which is crushed and graded for use as construction aggregate. The underlying layer contains the footprints, which were formed in mudflats during the Middle Jurassic. The tracks are similar to the nearby Ardley Trackways which were found in 1997.

A track found in summer 2025, 220 m (720 ft) long, has been described as "one of the longest trackways found anywhere in the world". It shows the tracks of a large sauropod dinosaur, "probably Cetiosaurus", moving at about 2 metres per second (6.6 ft/s), a speed similar to a human walking fast. Megalosaurus prints were also found. The tracks were probably all made over a period of weeks. The tracks date from 166 million years ago.

At the time the prints were made, the site was much closer to the equator and covered with a shallow tropical sea. The quarry floor has many tiny shells of sea creatures; an almost complete tiny sea urchin was found.

An excavation and investigation by paleontologists was featured in January 2025 in Alice Roberts' television series Digging for Britain. A cluster of Neolithic pits has been discovered, together with further early and middle Neolithic features.
