= Münchehagen dinosaur tracksite =

The Münchehagen dinosaur tracksite is a dinosaur track site in Germany. In 1999, Lockley and Wright discovered front prints left by large ornithopods walking along on all fours at the site. These rare traces were preserved in a single horizon of the Buckeburg Formation. Overall, Lockley and Wright documented twenty of slabs of ornithopod track-bearing rock, four of which recorded foreprints. Two of these specimens had consecutive hindprints allowing the pace length to be measured. Sauropod tracks are also known from the same stratigraphic layer.
