= Gravelbourg Formation =

- Stratigraphic range: Bajocian
- Type: Geological formation
- Sub-units: Upper Gravelbourg; Lower Gravelbourg
- Underlies: Shaunavon Formation
- Overlies: Watrous Formation; Madison Group
- Thickness: up to 60 metres (200 ft)

Lithology
- Primary: Shale, limestone
- Other: Chert, anhydrite, sandstone

Location
- Coordinates: 49.4638°N 108.5927°W
- Region: WCSB
- Country: Canada

Type section
- Named for: Gravelbourg, Saskatchewan
- Named by: R.L. Milner and G.E. Thomas, 1954

The Gravelbourg Formation is a stratigraphic unit of Bajocian age in the Western Canadian Sedimentary Basin.

It takes the name from the town of Gravelbourg, and was first described in well Tidewater Eastend Crown No. 1 by R.L. Milner and G.E. Thomas in 1954.

== Lithology ==
The Gravelbourg Formation is divided in two members, Lower and Upper Gravelbourg. The lower member is composed of dolomitic limestone with green shale laminations in the upper part, chalcedonic chert and anhydrite in the lower part and a basal shale bed with fish scales and anhydrite. The upper Gravelbourg consists of dark shale with sandstone and argillaceous limestone stringers and a tan mudstone bed at the top.

== Distribution ==
The Gravelbourg Formation reaches a maximum thickness of 60 metres (200 ft) in the Williston Basin. At its type locality in southwestern Saskatchewan, it is 27 metres (90 ft) thick. It thins out westwards at the eastern flank of the Sweetgrass Arch in southern Alberta and eastwards into southwestern Manitoba.

== Relationship to other units ==
The Gravelbourg Formation is conformably overlain by the Shaunavon Formation. It conformably overlies the Watrous Formation in Manitoba and southeastern Saskatchewan, and unconformably overlays the Madison Group in south-eastern Alberta.

The Lower Gravelbourg is equivalent to the Reston Formation in Manitoba and parts of the Nesson Formation in North Dakota and Montana, while the Upper Gravelbourg is equivalent to the lower Melita Formation in southeastern Manitoba and the Tampico Shale of the Piper Formation in North Dakota and Montana.
