= Sundance Formation =

Geological formation in Western North America

Coordinates: 44.2568°N 105.6824°W

- Stratigraphic range: Bathonian - Oxfordian 168–157 Ma
- Type: Geological formation
- Sub-units: Canyon Springs Sandstone Member, Hulett Sandstone Member, Lak Member, Pine Butte Member, Redwater Shale Member, Stockade Beaver (Shale) Member, Windy Hill Sandstone Member
- Underlies: Morrison Formation
- Overlies: Gypsum Springs Formation
- Thickness: Up to 100 m

Lithology
- Primary: shale
- Other: limestone, sandstone

Location
- Region: Western North America
- Country: United States

Type section
- Named for: Sundance, Wyoming
- Named by: Darton
- Year defined: 1904

The Sundance Formation is a western North American sequence of Middle Jurassic to Upper Jurassic age Dating from the Bathonian to the Oxfordian, around 168-157 Ma, It is up to 100 metres thick and consists of marine shale, sandy shale, sandstone, and limestone deposited in the Sundance Sea, an inland sea that covered large parts of western North America during the Middle and early Late Jurassic.

== Geology ==
The Sundance Formation underlies the western North American Morrison Formation, the most fertile source of dinosaur fossils in the Americas, and is separated by a disconformity from the underlying Middle Jurassic Gypsum Springs Formation.

=== Fossils ===
The Sundance Formation is known for fossils of an extinct species of marine cephalopod, the belemnite Pachyteuthis densus, as well as several extinct species of oyster, including Deltoideum, Liostrea, and Gryphaea nebrascensis. Other common invertebrates include crinoids, echinoids, gastropods, insects, ostracods, and foraminifera.

Fossil dinosaur 'footprints' on an ancient ocean shoreline are preserved in the formation and protected at the Red Gulch Dinosaur Tracksite, located in the Bureau of Land Management Red Gulch/Alkali National Back Country Byway, near Shell in Big Horn County, Wyoming.

Two unusual trackways from the formation are not easily identifiable to taxonomic group, though one could have been from an injured pterosaur.

== Paleobiota ==
=== Reptiles ===
Genus	Species	Member	Material	Notes
Pteraichnus	P. stokesi	Alcova/Grey Reef Reservoir, Seminoe Reservoir and Bighorn Canyon National Recreation area. (Wyoming)	Trace fossils	Pterosaur tracks
Tatenectes	T. laramiensis	Redwater Shale Member		A cryptoclidid plesiosaur
Pantosaurus	P. striatus	Redwater Shale Member		A cryptoclidid plesiosaur
Megalneusaurus	M. rex	Redwater Shale Member		A thalassophonean pliosaur
Baptanodon	B. natans	Redwater Shale Member		An ophthalmosaurid ichthyosaur
Plesiosaurus	"P." shirleyensis		Material now lost.	Possibly a junior synonym of Pantosaurus striatus

=== Fish ===
Genus	Species	Member	Material	Notes
Occithrissops	O. willsoni			An ichthyodectiform
Caturus	C. dartoni			A caturid amiiform
Hybodontiformes	indeterminate	Redwater Shale Member	Teeth	Belongs to a group of shark like cartilaginous fish called the Hybodontiformes. This might either be Hybodus or Asteracanthus. Found in association with Tatenectes.

=== Invertebrates ===
Genus	Species	Member	Material	Notes
Pachyteuthis	P. densus			A belemnite
Wyoteuthis	W. linsterorum			A belemnite
