= Vanguard Formation =

- Stratigraphic range: Callovian to Oxfordian
- Type: Geological formation
- Sub-units: Masefield Shale; Roseray Formation; Rush Lake Shale
- Underlies: Mannville Group
- Overlies: Shaunavon Formation
- Thickness: up to 180 metres (590 ft)

Lithology
- Primary: Shale, sandstone

Location
- Coordinates: 49.36°N 107.79°W
- Region: WCSB, Williston Basin
- Country: Canada, United States

Type section
- Named for: Vanguard, Saskatchewan
- Named by: Milner & Thomas
- Year defined: 1954
- Vanguard Formation (Canada)

The Vanguard Formation is a stratigraphical unit of Callovian to Oxfordian age in the Western Canadian Sedimentary Basin.

It takes the name from Vanguard, and was first defined by R.L. Milner and G.E. Thomas in 1954.

== Lithology ==
The Vanguard Formation is composed of calcareous shale with a median quartzose sandstone.

== Distribution ==
The Vanguard Formation Lateral reaches a maximum thickness of 180 metres (590 ft) in the Williston Basin along the Saskatchewan/Montana border.

== Relationship to other units ==
The Vanguard Formation is unconformably overlain by the Mannville Group and disconformably overlays the Shaunavon Formation.

It is equivalent to the Ellis Group in Montana and North Dakota.

== Subdivisions ==
In south-western Saskatchewan, Vanguard has group status, and includes the following subdivisions (of formation rank):

- Masefield Shale: calcareous shale
- Roseray Formation: quartzose glauconitic sandstone
- Rush Lake Shale: calcareous shale with Gryphaea and Kepplerites ammonite fossils
