= Shaunavon =

Shaunavon can refer to:

- Shaunavon, Saskatchewan, a town in Saskatchewan, Canada
  - Shaunavon (electoral district), a former provincial electoral district in Saskatchewan, Canada
  - Shaunavon Airport, an airport near Shaunavon, Saskatchewan
- Shaunavon Formation, a stratigraphical unit of the Western Canadian Sedimentary Basin
