= Red Gulch Dinosaur Tracksite =

Dinosaur fossil site in Wyoming, US

Coordinates: 44°29′10″N 107°47′15″W

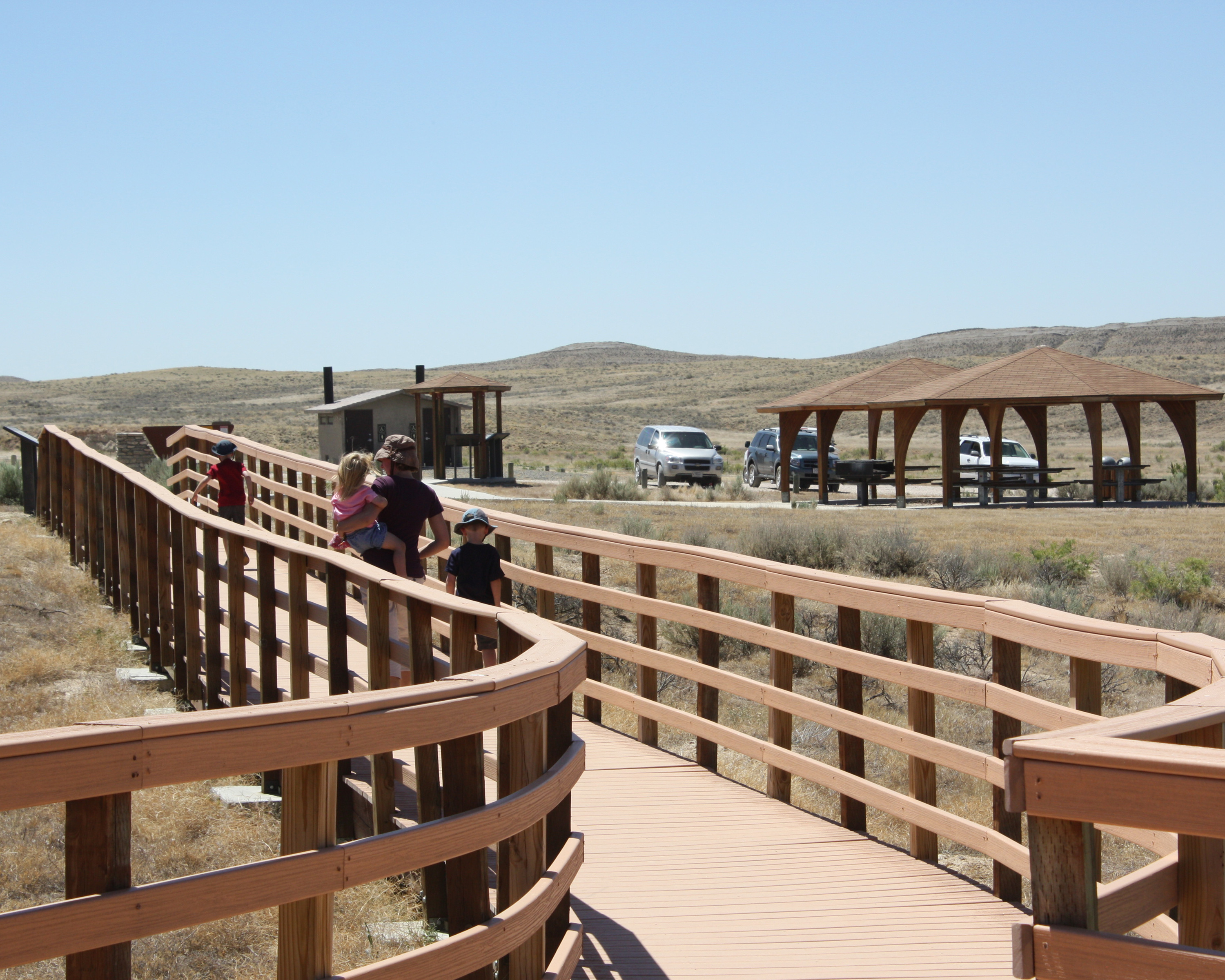
Observation platform at Red Gulch Dinosaur Tracksite

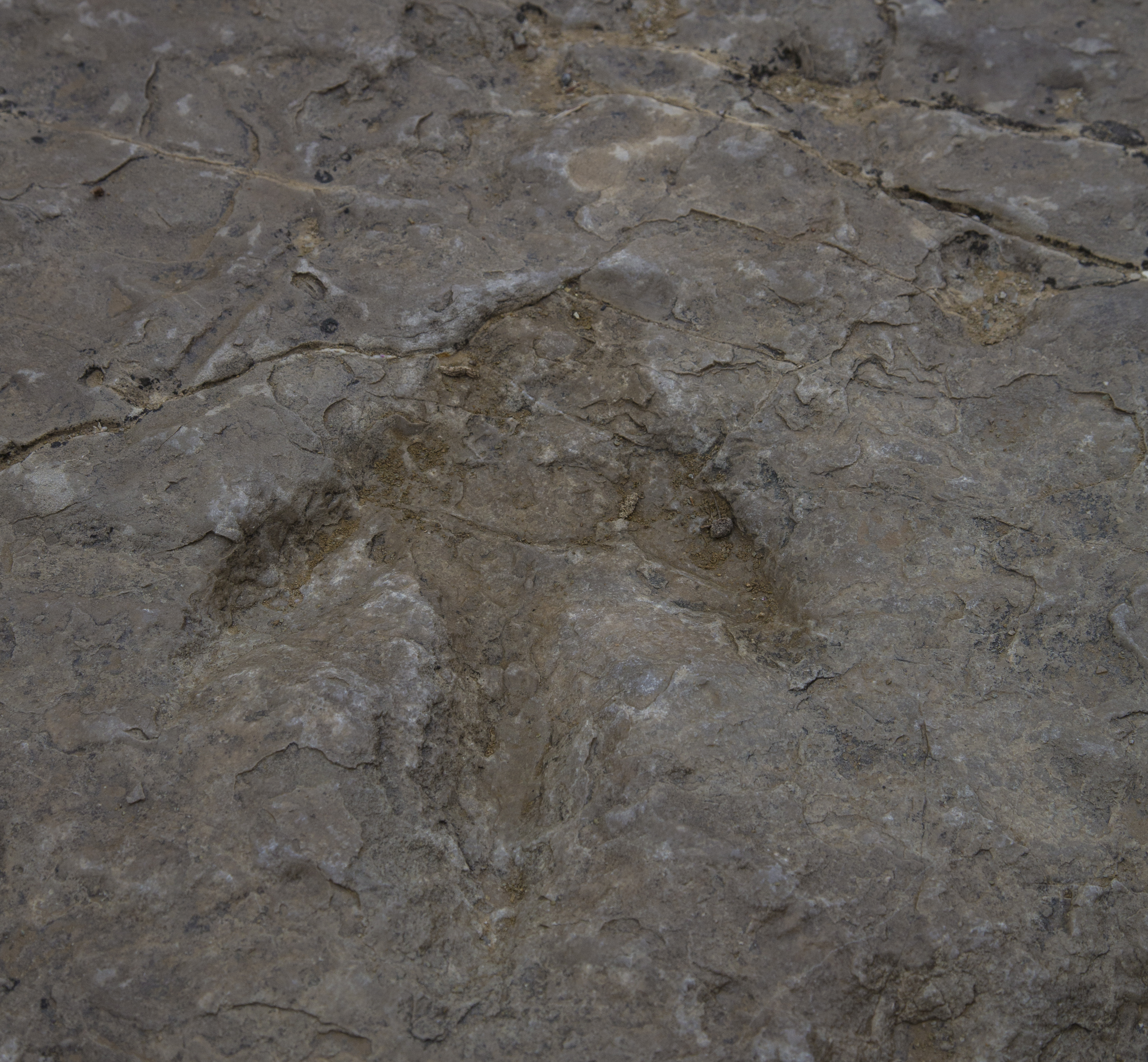
Dinosaur footprint at the tracksite

Red Gulch Dinosaur Tracksite is an assemblage of fossil dinosaur footprints on public land near Shell, in Big Horn County, Wyoming.

They were discovered in 1997 by Erik P. Kvale, a research geologist from the Indiana Geological Survey.

The site is managed by the Bureau of Land Management as part of the Red Gulch/Alkali National Back Country Byway and is open to the public.

== Fossils ==
The fossilized tracks are believed to have been made during the Middle Jurassic Period, 160–180 million years b.p., on what was then a shore of the Sundance Sea. Theropod tracks are thought to be among those discovered, but evidence suggests that the tracks were made by a large, diverse group of dinosaurs. Due to a rarity of Middle Jurassic theropods, the species that made the tracks is currently unknown. The majority of the footprints are in the area dubbed "the ballroom".

Besides the trackways, a variety of fossils can be found, including belemnites, crinoids, and shrimp burrows.

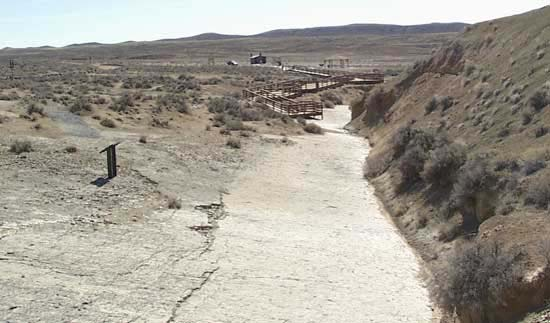
Walkway at the dinosaur tracksite overlook

== Geology ==
The tracksite is in a limestone layer in the lower part of the Sundance Formation. Its discovery was somewhat surprising, since the Sundance was historically considered to be marine in nature. Indeed, the layer just above the tracksite contains abundant marine fossils including numerous Gryphaea nebrascensis, indicating that later in the Jurassic it was once again submerged.

== See also ==
- Sundance Formation
- Fossil trackway
- Sundance Sea
