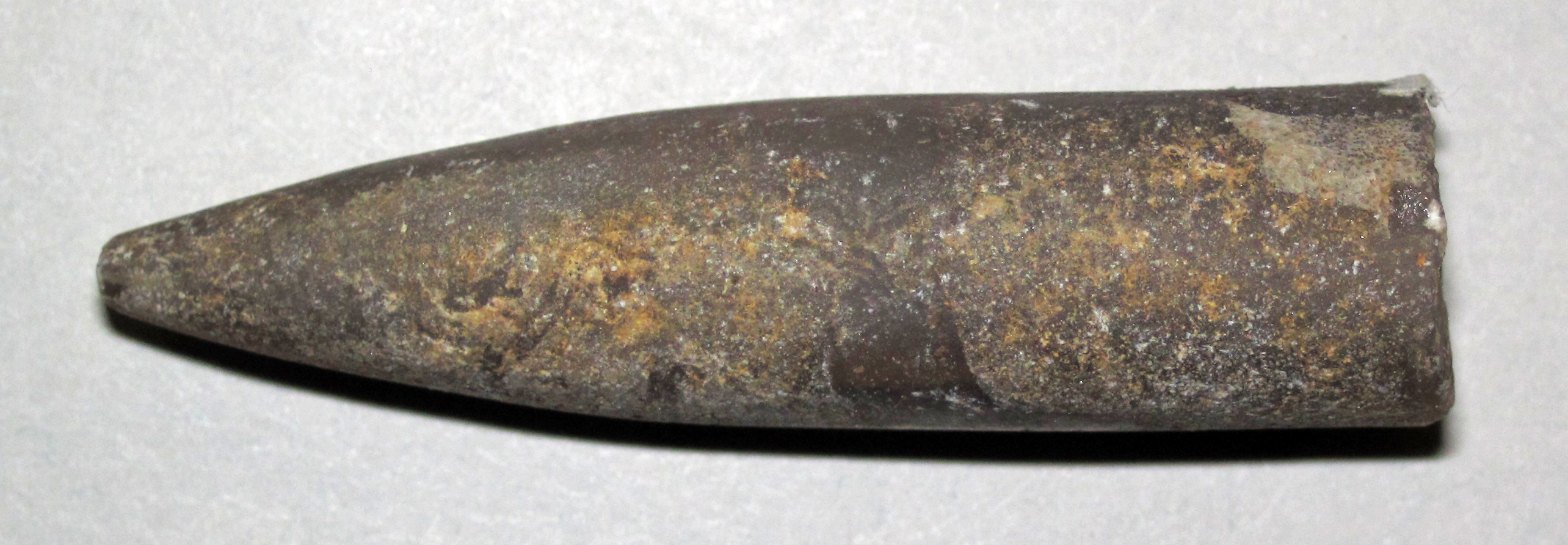
- Fossil of P. densus from the Swift Formation

Scientific classification
- Kingdom: Animalia
- Phylum: Mollusca
- Class: Cephalopoda
- Order: †Belemnitida
- Genus: †Pachyteuthis; Bayle, 1878

Type species
- †Pachyteuthis densus (Meek & Hayden, 1858)

= Pachyteuthis =

Pachyteuthis Temporal range: Early Jurassic–Early Cretaceous

Extinct genus of molluscs

Pachyteuthis is a genus of belemnites that lived from the Early Jurassic to the Early Cretaceous, and has been found in Asia, Europe and North America. The type species is Pachyteuthis densus.
