= Red Gulch/Alkali National Back Country Byway =

Highway in Wyoming, US

Red Gulch/Alkali National Back Country Byway

Route information
- Maintained by Bureau of Land Management
- Length: 32 mi (51 km)

Major junctions
- South end: WYO 31 in Hyattville
- North end: US 14 near Shell

Location
- Country: United States
- State: Wyoming

Highway system
- Scenic Byways; National; National Forest; BLM; NPS; Wyoming State Highway System; Interstate; US; State

The Red Gulch/Alkali National Back Country Byway is a 32-mile-long (51 km) National Scenic Byway to the west of the Big Horn Mountains in Wyoming in the United States. It connects Wyoming Highway 31 (WYO 31) in Hyattville with U.S. Route 14 (US 14) near Shell.

The route travels through the Big Horn Basin and the Chugwater Formation is visible. The windswept area has interesting rock formations, like hoodoos, steep canyons, and caves.

== Route description ==
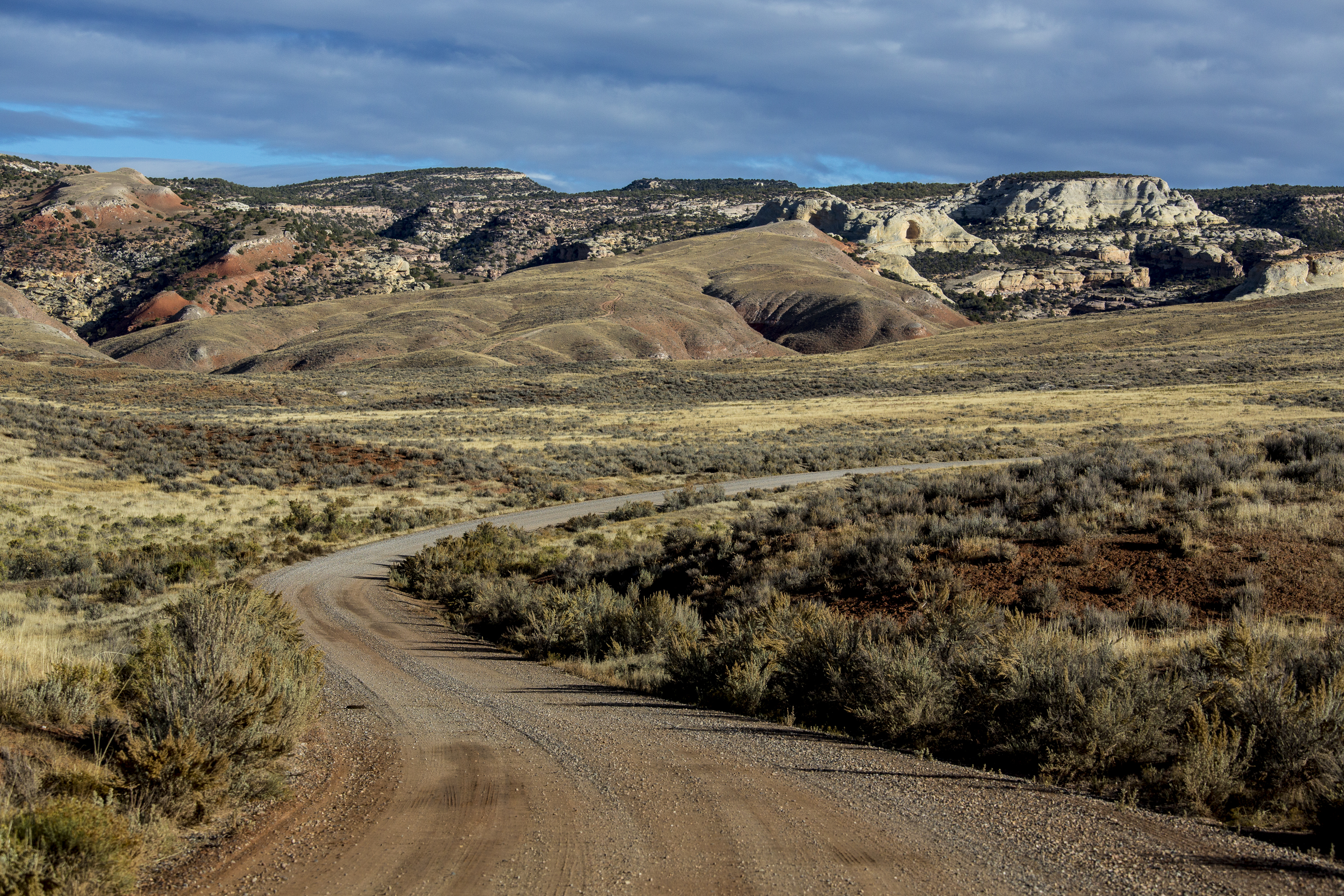
Alkali Road

The byway begins at an intersection with Wyoming Highway 31 (WYO 31) in Hyattville to U.S. Route 14 (US 14) south-southwest of Shell. Alkali Road and Red Gulch Road meet at 44.412°N 107.557°W. It is lightly traveled and unpaved. The byway can be driven from May through to October; though light rain can make traveling conditions unsafe. Also, in dry conditions, there can be considerable dust. There are no towns, stores, or gas stations along the way.

Attractions include the Red Gulch Dinosaur Tracksite and the Medicine Lodge State Archeological Site. Dayhikes and fishing are allowed.

== Major intersections ==
The entire route is in Big Horn County.

Location	mi	km	Destinations	Notes
Hyattville	0	0.0	WYO 31 – Manderson, Hyattville	Southern terminus
	32	51	US 14 – Greybull, Shell, Sheridan	Northern terminus
1.000 mi = 1.609 km; 1.000 km = 0.621 mi
