= Kevin Padian =

American paleontologist (born 1951)

- Born: 1951 (age 74–75)
- Education: Ph.D. 1980, Yale University
- Employer: University of California, Berkeley
- Title: Professor of Integrative Biology; Curator of Paleontology, University of California Museum of Paleontology; past President, National Center for Science Education

Kevin Padian (born 1951) is an American paleontologist and evolutionary biologist. He is Professor of Integrative Biology and Curator of the Museum of Paleontology Emeritus at the University of California, Berkeley, where he taught from 1980 to 2020. Padian's research focuses on vertebrate evolution, especially the origins of flight, the paleobiology of pterosaurs, the emergence of dinosaurs across the Triassic-Jurassic boundary, the evolution of birds from theropod dinosaurs, the growth dynamics of dinosaurs and related fossil reptiles, and the interpretation of fossilized footprints.^{[2]} He has also focused on the history of evolutionary thought, particularly surrounding the Victorian Age and the European Enlightenment, regarding Transcendentalism and the evolving interpretation of morphology, as well as the emergence of the theory of evolution by Darwin and his contemporaries. Padian has authored and co-authored nearly 150 scientific articles and some 200 reviews, perspectives, and popular articles, and has co-edited and co-written ten books.

== Early life and education ==
Padian received a bachelor’s degree in natural science and a Master of Arts in Teaching from Colgate University. He later earned an M.A. and a Ph.D. in biology from Yale University, where his research focused on the evolution of flight in vertebrates. His Ph.D. work in paleobiology examined the flight and locomotion of pterosaurs. He proposed that pterosaur wings were not attached to the ankles in a bat-like manner, and that their hip joints and hind limbs functioned more similarly to those of birds and other dinosaurs, consistent with common ancestry. He also argued that pterosaurs were primarily bipedal and lacked anatomical features associated with arboreal locomotion, leading him to infer that powered flight in the group evolved in a terrestrial context.

Padian further hypothesized that pterosaurs originated from small bipedal archosaurs, an idea anticipated in a different form by Friedrich von Huene and later supported by phylogenetic studies, including work by Davide Foffa, Sterling Nesbitt, and colleagues in 2022 and 2023. His interpretations of pterosaur anatomy and posture built on earlier comparative approaches dating back to Georges Cuvier.

== Academic career ==
Padian joined the University of California, Berkeley, in 1980 as Professor of Integrative Biology and Curator of the Museum of Paleontology, where he taught until 2020. He also served as Research Associate at the Museum of the Rockies, Montana State University (2000–2015).

=== Professional service ===
Padian held numerous roles in the Society of Vertebrate Paleontology from 1983 through 2002. He served on the Romer Prize Committee (1983–1986), was Program Chairman (1984, 1993–1996), chaired the Publications Promotions Committee (1988–1989), and served on the Media Relations Committee (1996–2002). He was also on editorial boards for the Journal of Vertebrate Paleontology, Geology, Paleobiology, Palaeontologia africana, Trends in Ecology and Evolution, and several other journals. He continues as Subject Editor in Organismal and Evolutionary Biology for Royal Society Open Science.

Padian served as President of the National Center for Science Education from 1995 to 2012 and held other board positions starting in 1988. He contributed to K–12 science education, including as a principal author of the 1990 California Science Framework K–12.

== Research ==
Padian's research covers vertebrate evolution, pterosaurs, early birds, dinosaurs, and the history of evolutionary thought.

=== Pterosaur locomotion and flight ===
Padian was the first since Georges Cuvier in the early 1800s to recognize that the wings of pterosaurs were not attached, batlike, to their ankles, that their hip joints and legs worked functionally like those of birds and other dinosaurs (by common ancestry), and that they were bipeds that showed no features that correlated with arboreality. Consequently, in these animals, as in birds, flight had to evolve in a terrestrial setting. He also showed that the forelimbs of pterosaurs functioned as fully capable wings like those of birds and bats. Their hindlimbs could not have been positioned sticking out to the sides, as in bats, without likely dislocating the hip joint, based on phylogenetic comparisons.”

Padian collaborated with James Cunningham, Wann Langston, and John Conway on studies of the functional morphology of Quetzalcoatlus, the largest known flying animal with a wingspan of 33–35 feet (11–12 m). Their work presented evidence that although Quetzalcoatlus moved quadrupedally on the ground, propulsion came from the hindlimbs, and forelimbs were largely non-weightbearing. This made a quadrupedal launch impossible. During terrestrial progression, the forelimbs were lifted to allow the hindlimbs to stride and lowered after foot placement.

In 2009, Padian joined Jean-Michel Mazin and colleagues to study the Pterosaur Beach prints, reconstructing an aerial landing with feet side by side, followed by quadrupedal walking.

=== Histology and growth dynamics ===
In the 1990s, Padian joined John R. Horner and Armand de Ricqlès to develop a program studying dinosaur, pterosaur, and archosaur growth dynamics using histological analysis of fossil bones from the UCMP, the Museum of the Rockies, and other collections. Their work, spanning about two dozen papers, described tissue structure, compared features with living vertebrates, and interpreted growth dynamics in a developmental and physiological context. They concluded that dinosaur and pterosaur bones grew more like those of birds and mammals than other reptiles, suggesting higher basal metabolic rates.

=== Transitional vertebrates ===
Padian and his students documented many transitional sequences in vertebrate evolution, demonstrating evolutionary steps between major groups from the Devonian to the present. This formed the basis of his testimony in Kitzmiller v. Dover Area School District, refuting “intelligent design” claims.

== Awards and honors ==
- Fellow, California Academy of Sciences (since 1984)
- Distinguished Lecturer, Sigma Xi (1999–2001)
- Invited Professor, Collège de France, Paris (2002, 2006)
- Invited Professor, National Museum of Natural History, Paris (2003)
- Invited Professor, University of Paris VI (2006)
- Faculty Fellow, California Science Teachers’ Association (2006)
- Carl Sagan Prize for the Popularization of Science (2003)
- Fellow, American Association for the Advancement of Science (2007)
- Western Evolutionary Biologist of the Year (2008)
- Moore Lecture, Society for Integrative and Comparative Biology (2019)
