= Lagosteiros Natural Monument =

Natural monument in Portugal

- Monumento Natural dos Lagosteiros
- IUCN category III (natural monument or feature)
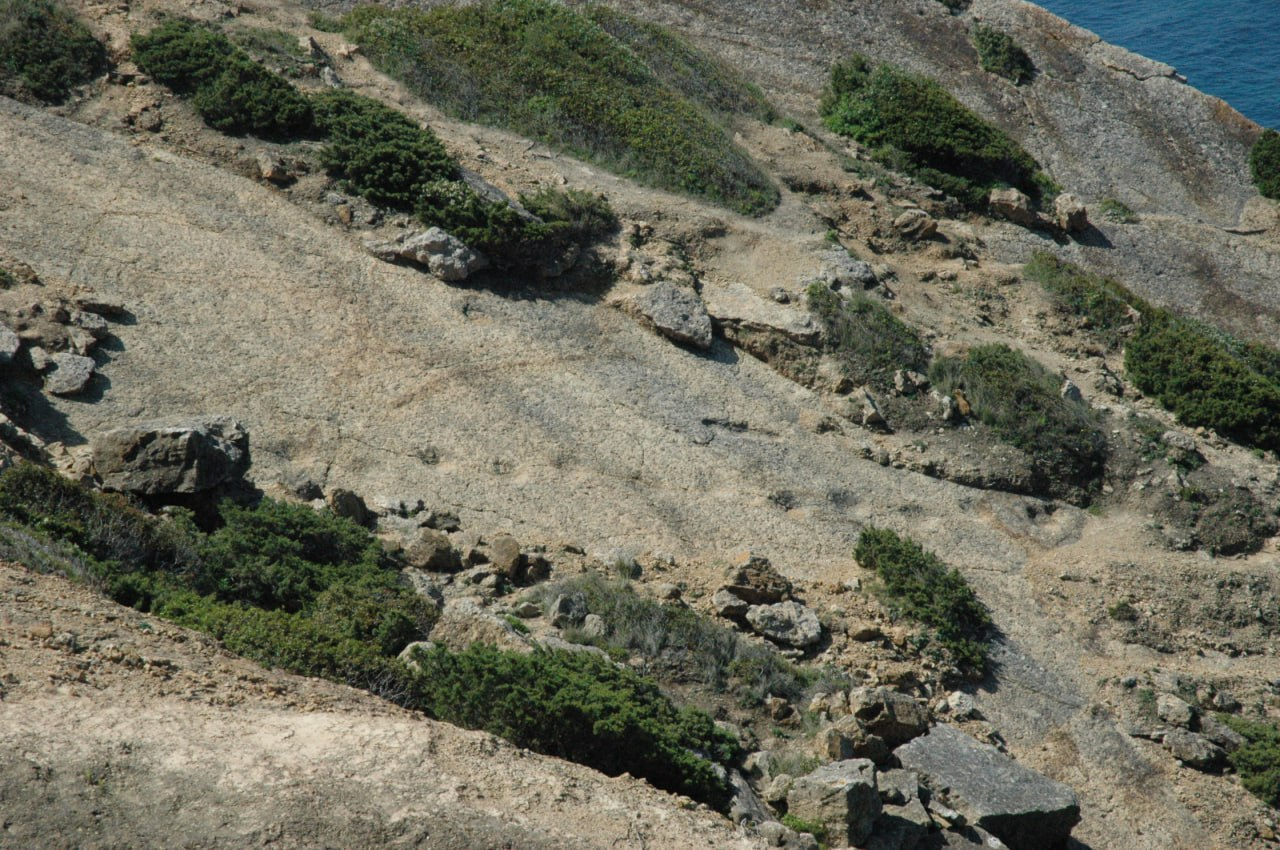
- The main trackway at the site

- Location within Portugal
- Location: Portugal
- Nearest city: Sesimbra
- Coordinates: 38°25′32.6″N 9°12′58.8″W
- Area: 5.8 ha (14 acres)
- Designation: May 7, 1997.
- Governing body: Institute for Nature Conservation and Forests
- Website: http://monumentos.gov.pt/Site/APP_PagesUser/SIPA.aspx?id=30891

The Lagosteiros Natural Monument, near Cape Espichel, in Sesimbra, Portugal, is a Portuguese protected area created in 1997, consisting of dinosaur trackway ichnites.

== Geologic context ==
The Lagosteiros site is included within the Lusitanian Basin and is the most recent dinosaur track site in the Cabo Espichel region, having been formed approximately 130 to 120 million years ago, during the Early Cretaceous, when the western margin of Portugal had flat, marshy and muddy terrains. Those soft sediments eventually lithified into limestone strata, thus preserving the footprints of the dinosaurs that there roamed. Tectonic motion in the region has rotated the strata from its original horizontal layout to a north-dipping attitude of 45°.

== Natural monument description ==
=== Location ===
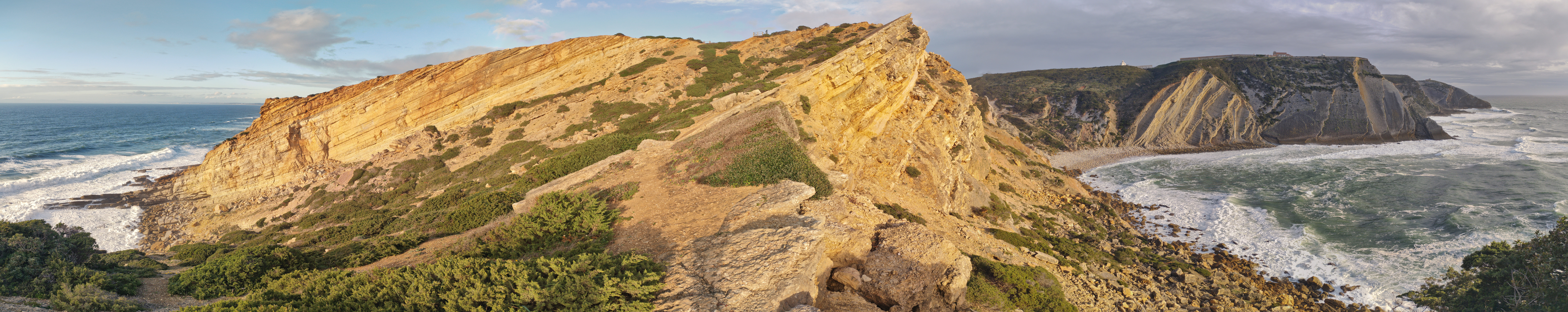
Location panorama, looking east and away from the Atlantic

Of great natural beauty, the Lagosteiros Natural Monument and its tracks are nowadays located on, and immediately adjacent to, the edge of the cliff that defines the northern side of the Lagosteiros Bay, and approximately 1400 meters away NNE from Cape Espichel. The tracks are visible in a stratum of yellowish-brown limestone.
Due to the strata's northwards dip, and the cliff walls that further rise above the site to the east, the best time of the day for visiting is during the afternoon, when the Sun strikes the rock bed at a good angle, shading the tracks in contrast with the illuminated rock, as seen in the photographs here. During a short period around the winter solstice, the Sun will not rise high enough in the sky to illuminate the natural monument, leaving it shaded.

=== Ichnology ===
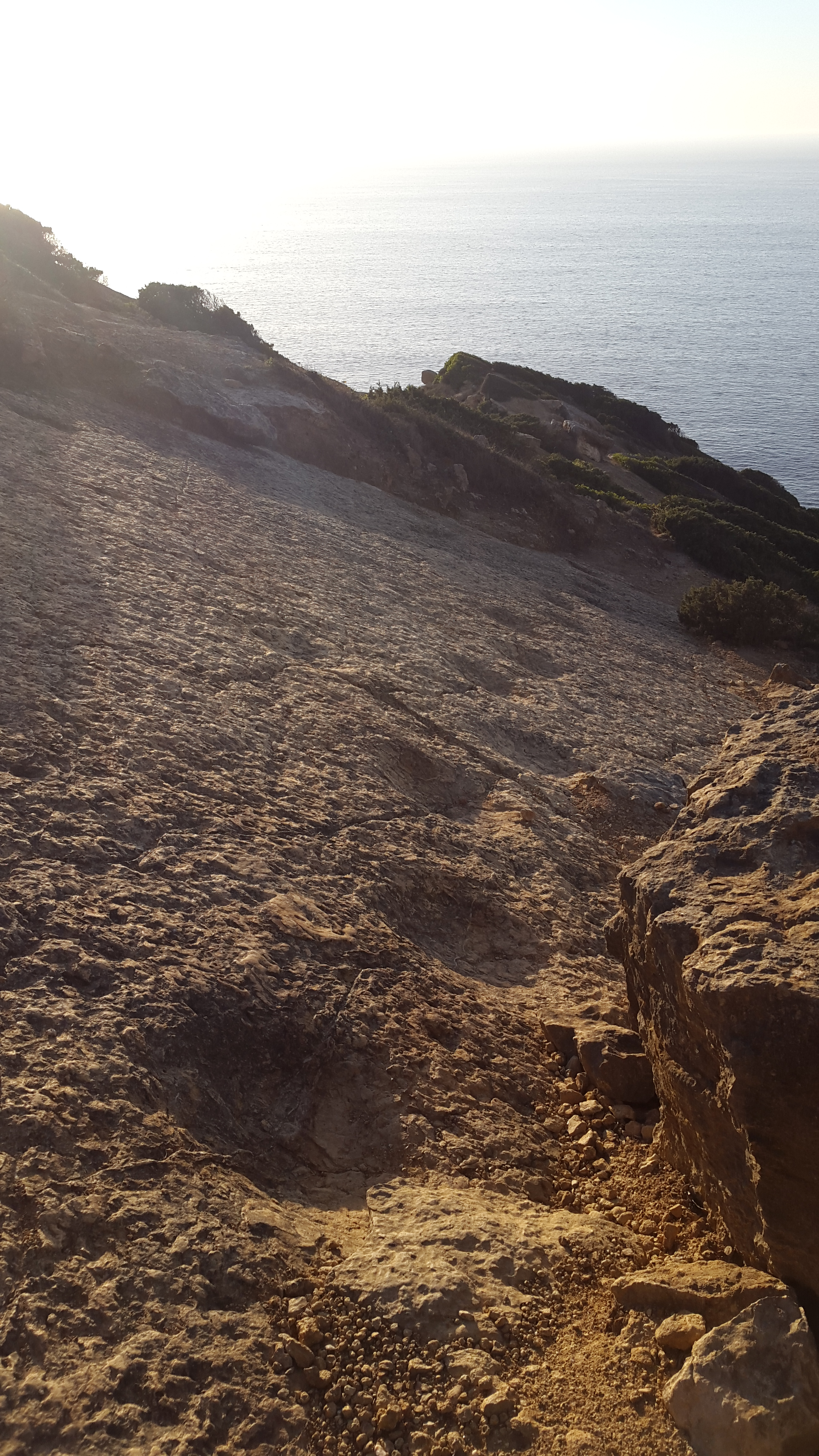
The main trackway at the site

Tracks of bipedal dinosaurs, theropods and herbivores are visible on the surface, in different orientations. Among the numerous tracks, a long main trackway stands out with large footprints, attributed to a bipedal animal. An approximately rectangular mark is visible on the side of this trail, possibly a tail mark. Theropod tracks feature the characteristic tridactyl footprints, pointed at the ends of the digits.
