= Pterosaur Beach =

Paleontological site in southwestern France

- Stratigraphic range: Tithonian
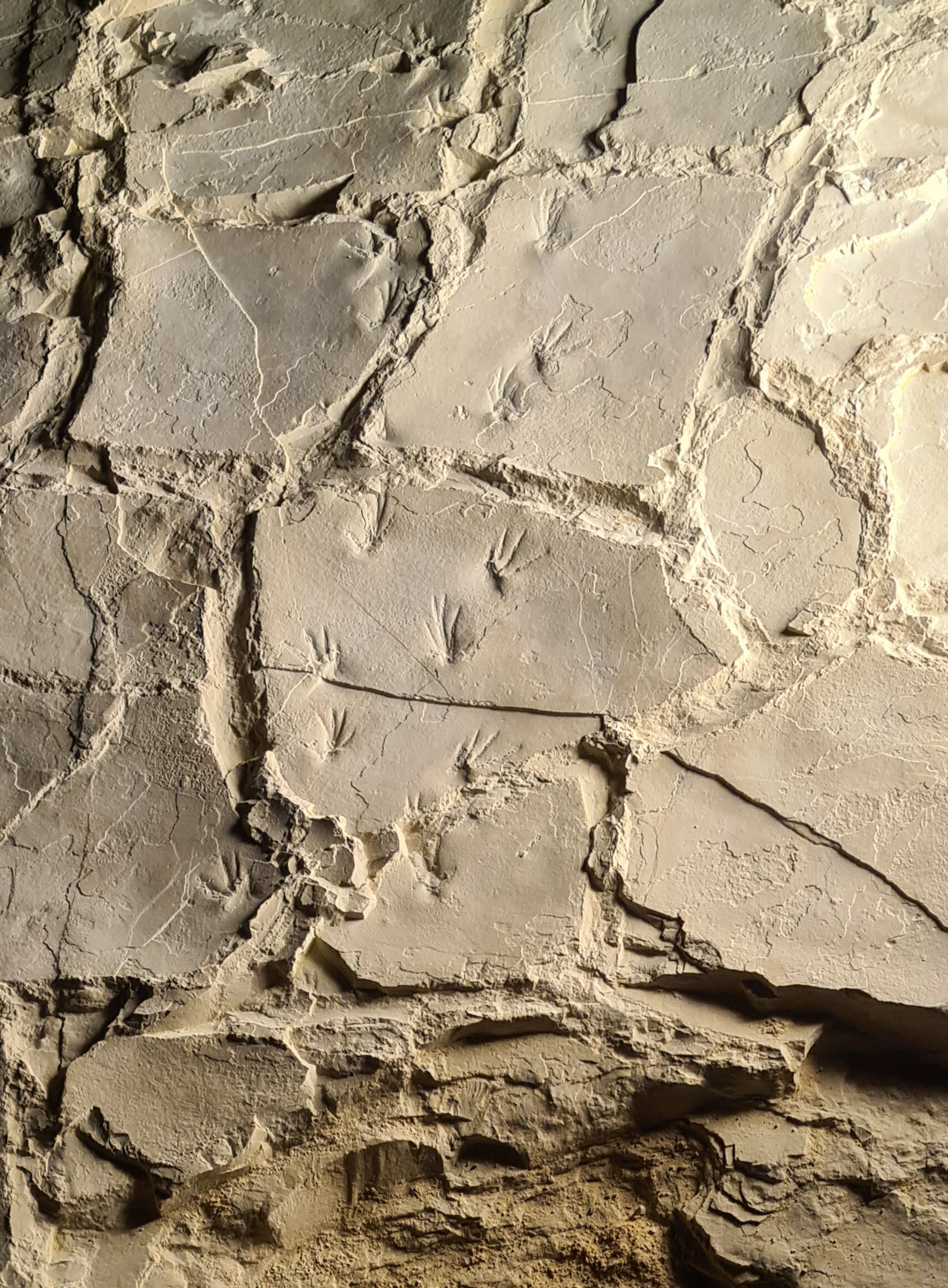
- Type: Fossil track

Location
- Coordinates: 44.5301°N 1.3259°E
- Region: Occitanie
- Country: France

Type section
- Named by: Dughi & Sirugue
- Pterosaur Beach (France)

Pterosaur Beach (French: Plage aux Ptérosaures) is a French palaeoichnologic site bearing tracks made by dinosaurs and pterosaurs. Located on the Mas de Pégourdy in the commune of Crayssac in the department of Lot, the site is notable because it is the first place that the fossil footprints of a landing pterosaur have been discovered. The fossil footprints are approximately 140 million years old.

== Description ==
Pterosaur Beach was, at the end of the Jurassic era, a mudflat, flooded at high tide, on a marine lagoon in a gulf that opened on the Atlantic Ocean between Bordeaux and the island of Oléron. On it, animals foraged for food. The site has hundreds of fossilized trackways. The site as a whole covers an area of around 10 hectares and is 1.2 metres thick.

The site was discovered in 1993. Jean-Michel Mazin, research director of the CNRS at Claude Bernard University, oversaw the research there. Forty species of ichnotaxa have been identified.

Pterosaur Beach is protected by a metallic building, in which paleontologists work in near-complete darkness, for only a raking light can expose the ground contours and sometimes reveal new tracks.

In 2009, the paleontologist Kevin Padian from the University of California at Berkeley, studied one set of pterosaur beach prints and suggested that they represented an aerial landing with the pterosaur's two "feet" side by side; then, after a jump, its two "hands" were used, and the pterosaur began to walk on all fours. For his part, the paleontologist David Unwin did not exclude that these could be swimming marks. Padian replied that if that were the case, the marks would be less clear, less marked. Martin Lockley also judged that it was indeed a landing; the other hypotheses were not convincing.

== Gallery ==
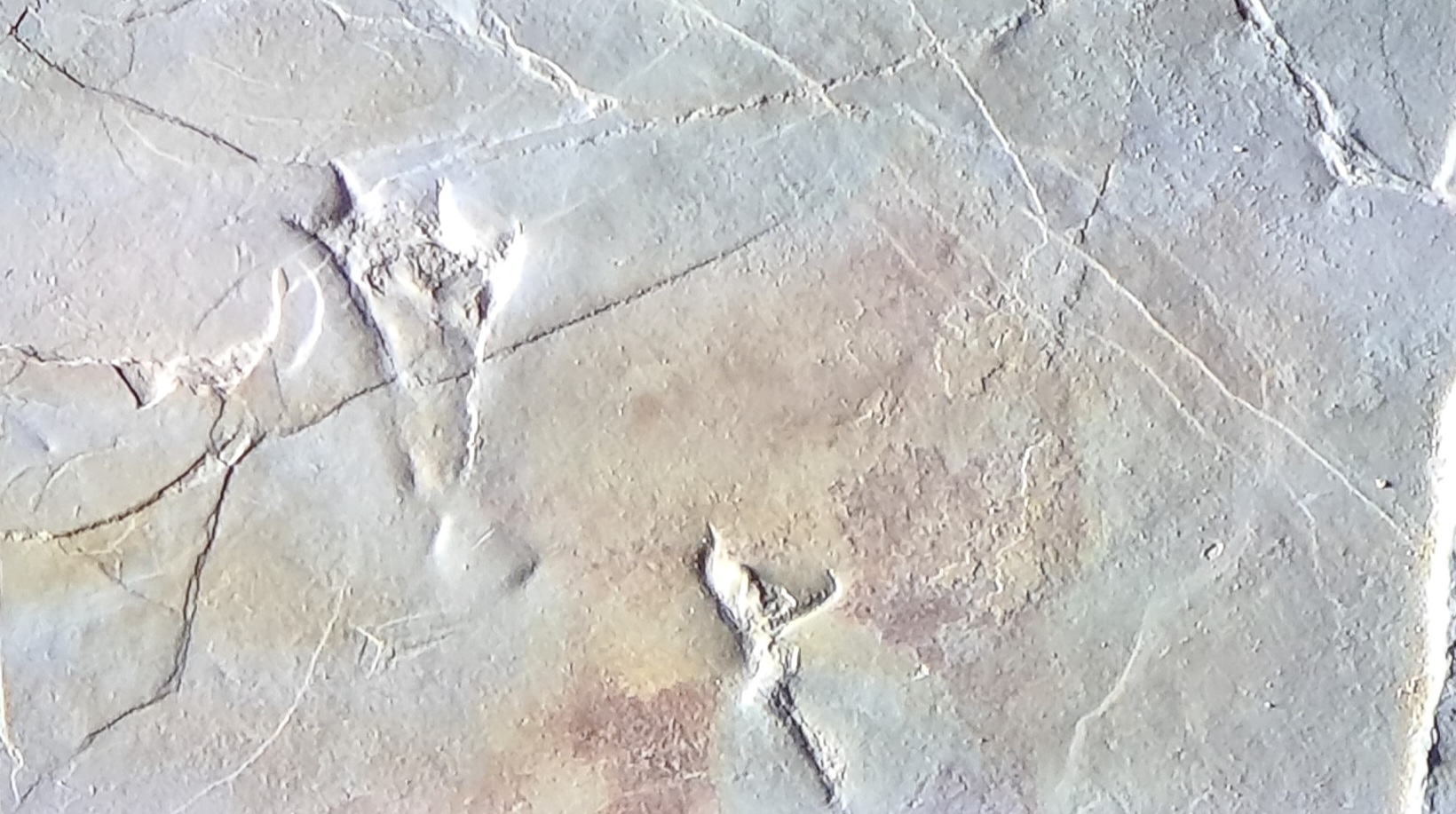
"Émile" prints

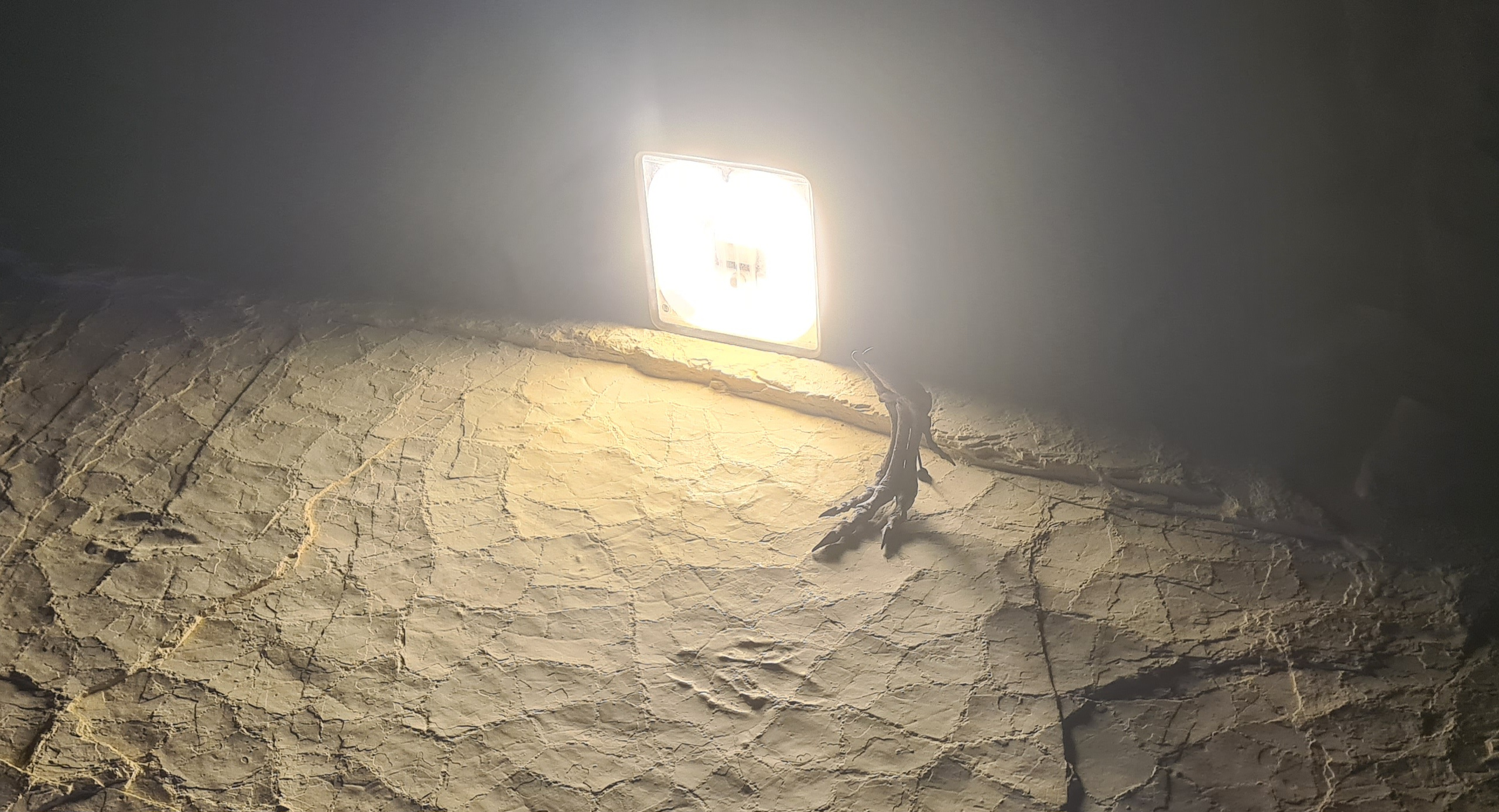
Reconstructed footprint and paw

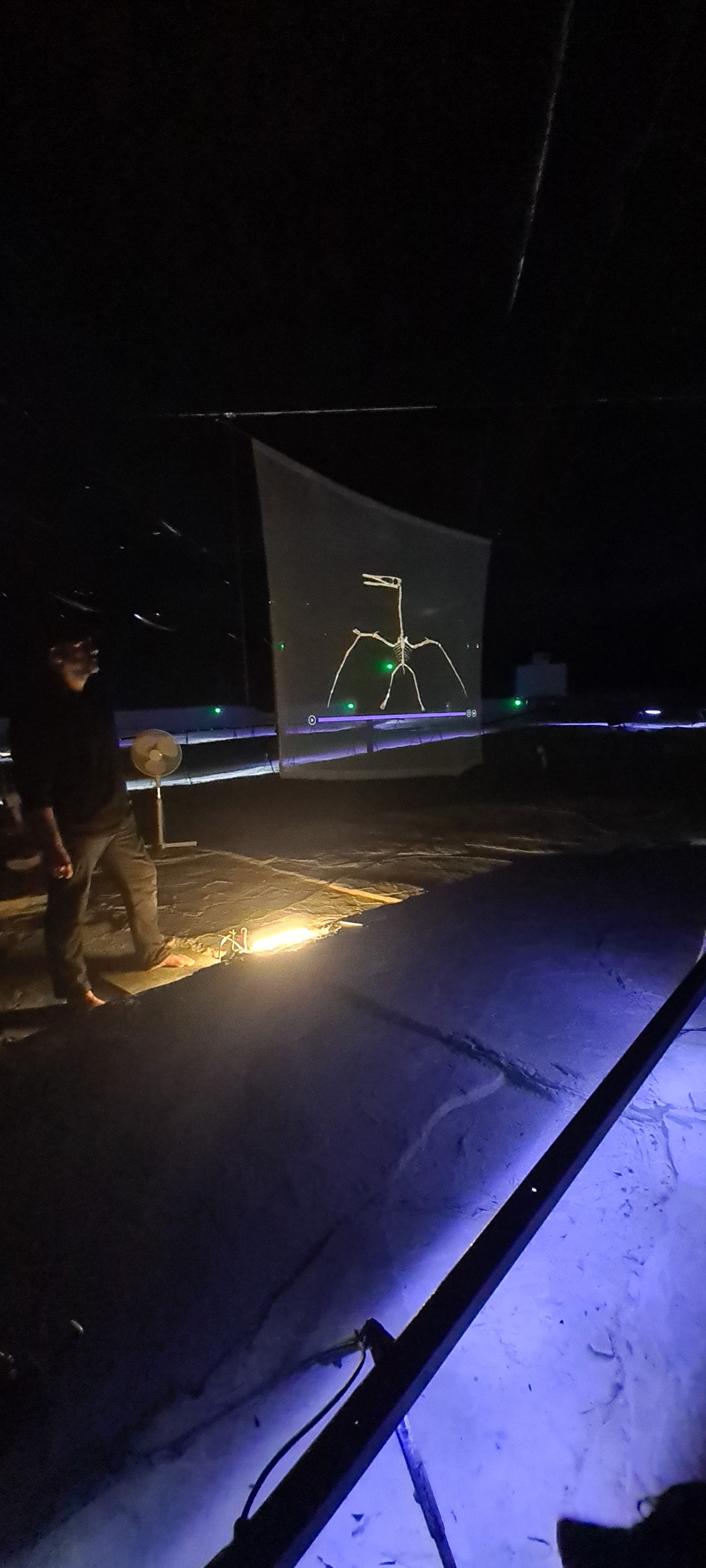
Guided tour

== See also ==
- Natural reserve of geological interest of the department of Lot
