= Ardley Trackways =

Protected area in Oxfordshire, England

Coordinates: 51.921°N 1.215°W

- Site of Special Scientific Interest
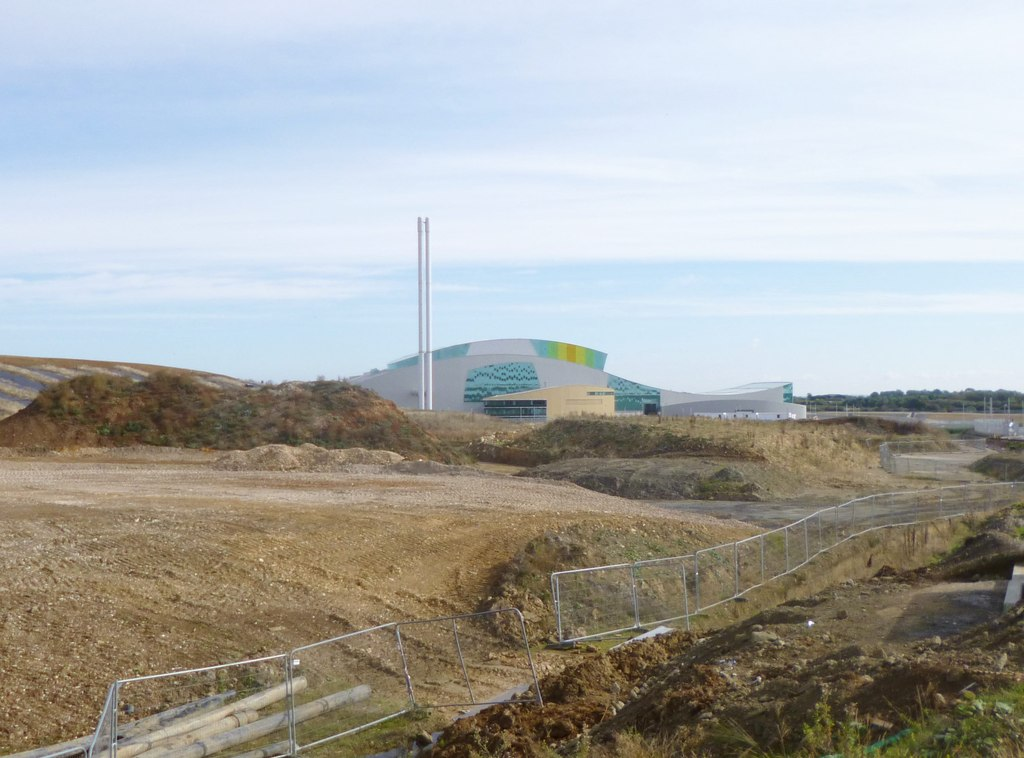
- Location of Ardley Trackways.
- Area of search: Oxfordshire
- Grid reference: SP 541 250
- Interest: Geological
- Area: 63.6 hectares (157 acres)
- Notification date: 2010
- Location map: Magic Map

Ardley Trackways is a 63.6-hectare (157-acre) geological Site of Special Scientific Interest north-west of Bicester in Oxfordshire. It is a Geological Conservation Review site.

This site is internationally important because it has trackways created by a herd of sauropod (herbivorous) dinosaurs, together with several carnivorous theropods, along a shoreline dating to the Middle Jurassic, around 165 million years ago. These are the only such trackways in England, and one of the few dating to the Middle Jurassic in the world. The tracks throw light on the behaviour and gait of the dinosaurs.

The site is private land with no public access.
