= Fossil track =

Fossilized footprint (ichnite)

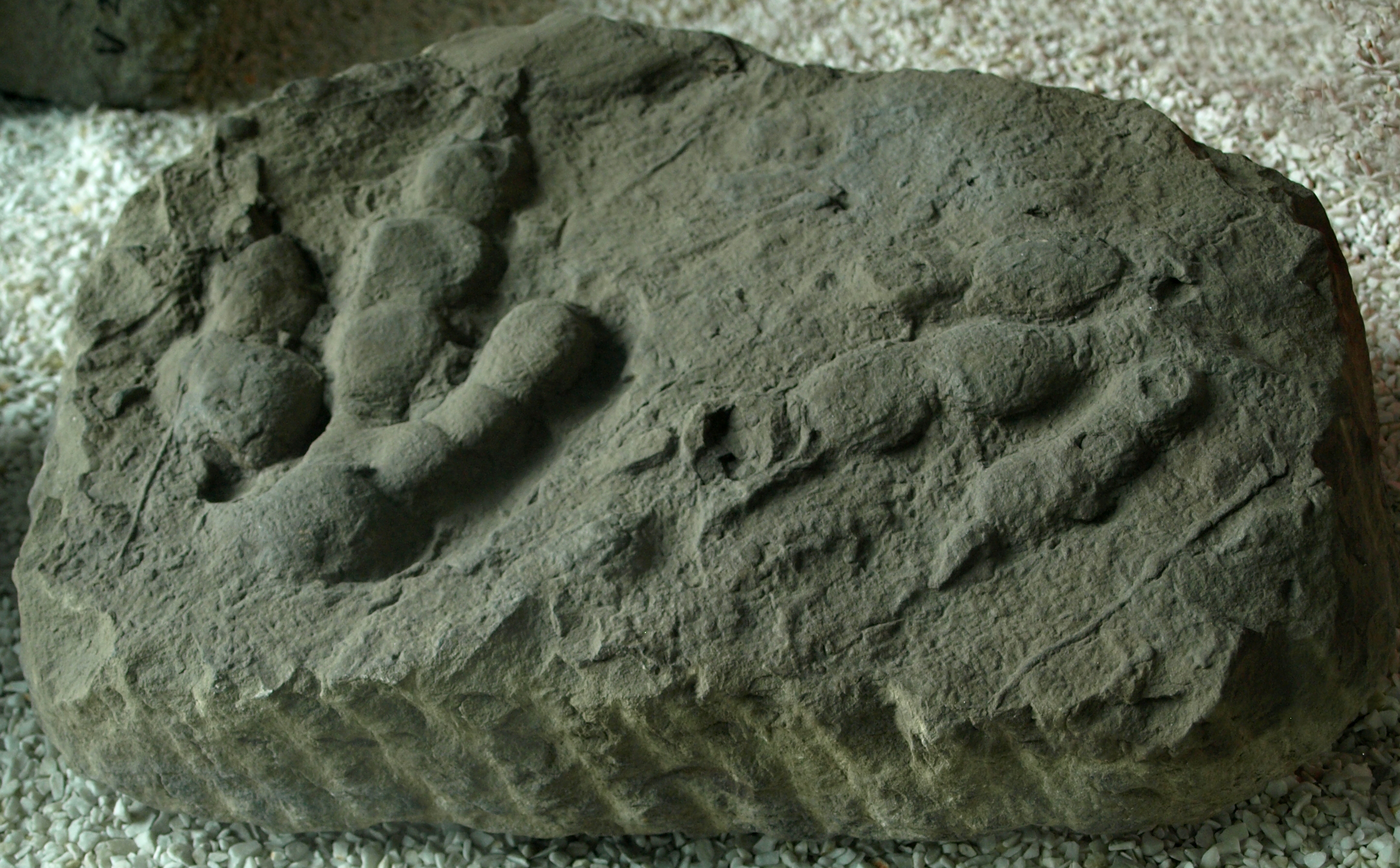
A reverse ichnite of the impression of Jialingpus yuechiensis, on display at the Paleozoological Museum of China

A fossil track or ichnite (Greek "ἴχνιον" (ichnion) – a track, trace or footstep) is a fossilized footprint. This is a type of trace fossil. A fossil trackway is a sequence of fossil tracks left by a single organism. Over the years, many ichnites have been found, around the world, giving important clues about the behaviour (and foot structure and stride) of the animals that made them. For instance, multiple ichnites of a single species, close together, suggest 'herd' or 'pack' behaviour of that species.

Combinations of footprints of different species provide clues about the interactions of those species. Even a set of footprints of a single animal gives important clues, as to whether it was bipedal or quadrupedal. In this way, it has been suggested that some pterosaurs, when on the ground, used their forelimbs in an unexpected quadrupedal action.

Special conditions are required, in order to preserve a footprint made in soft ground (such as an alluvial plain or a formative sedimentary deposit). A possible scenario is a sea or lake shore that became dried out to a firm mud in hot, dry conditions, received the footprints (because it would only have been partially hardened and the animal would have been heavy) and then became silted over in a flash storm.

The first ichnite found was in 1800 in Massachusetts, US, by a farmer named Pliny Moody, who found 1-foot (31 cm) long fossilized footprints. They were thought by Harvard and Yale scholars to be from "Noah's Raven".

A famous group of ichnites was found in a limestone quarry at Ardley, 20 km Northeast of Oxford, England, in 1997. They were thought to have been made by Megalosaurus and possibly Cetiosaurus. There are replicas of some of these footprints, set across the lawn of Oxford University Museum of Natural History (OUMNH).

A creature named Cheirotherium was, for a long time and still may be, only known from its fossilized trail. Its footprints were first found in 1834, in Thuringia, Germany, dating from the Late Triassic Period.

The largest known dinosaur footprints, belonging to sauropods and dating from the early Cretaceous were found to the north of Broome on the Dampier Peninsula, Western Australia, with some footprints measuring 1.7 m. The 3D digital documentation of tracks has the benefit of being able to examine ichnite in detail remotely and distribute the data to colleagues and other interested personnel.

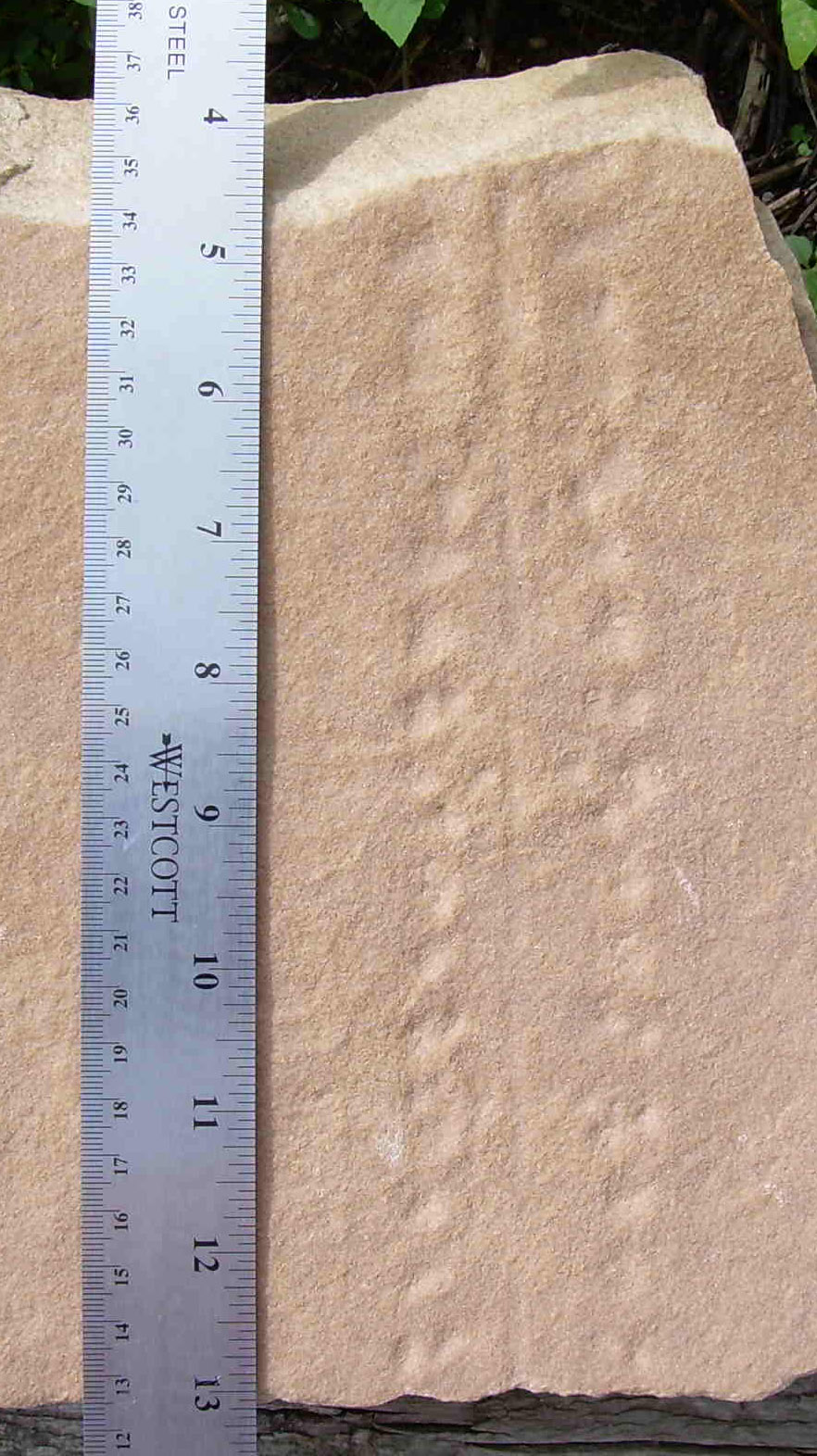
Fossil trackway Protichnites in sedimentary stone

== Fossil trackways ==
Many fossil trackways were made by dinosaurs, early tetrapods, and other quadrupeds and bipeds on land. Marine organisms also made many ancient trackways (such as the trails of trilobites and eurypterids like Hibbertopterus).

Some basic fossil trackway types:

1. footprints
2. tail drags
3. belly drag marks – (e.g., tetrapods)
4. chain of trace platforms – (example: Yorgia)
5. body imprint – (Monuron trackway, insect)

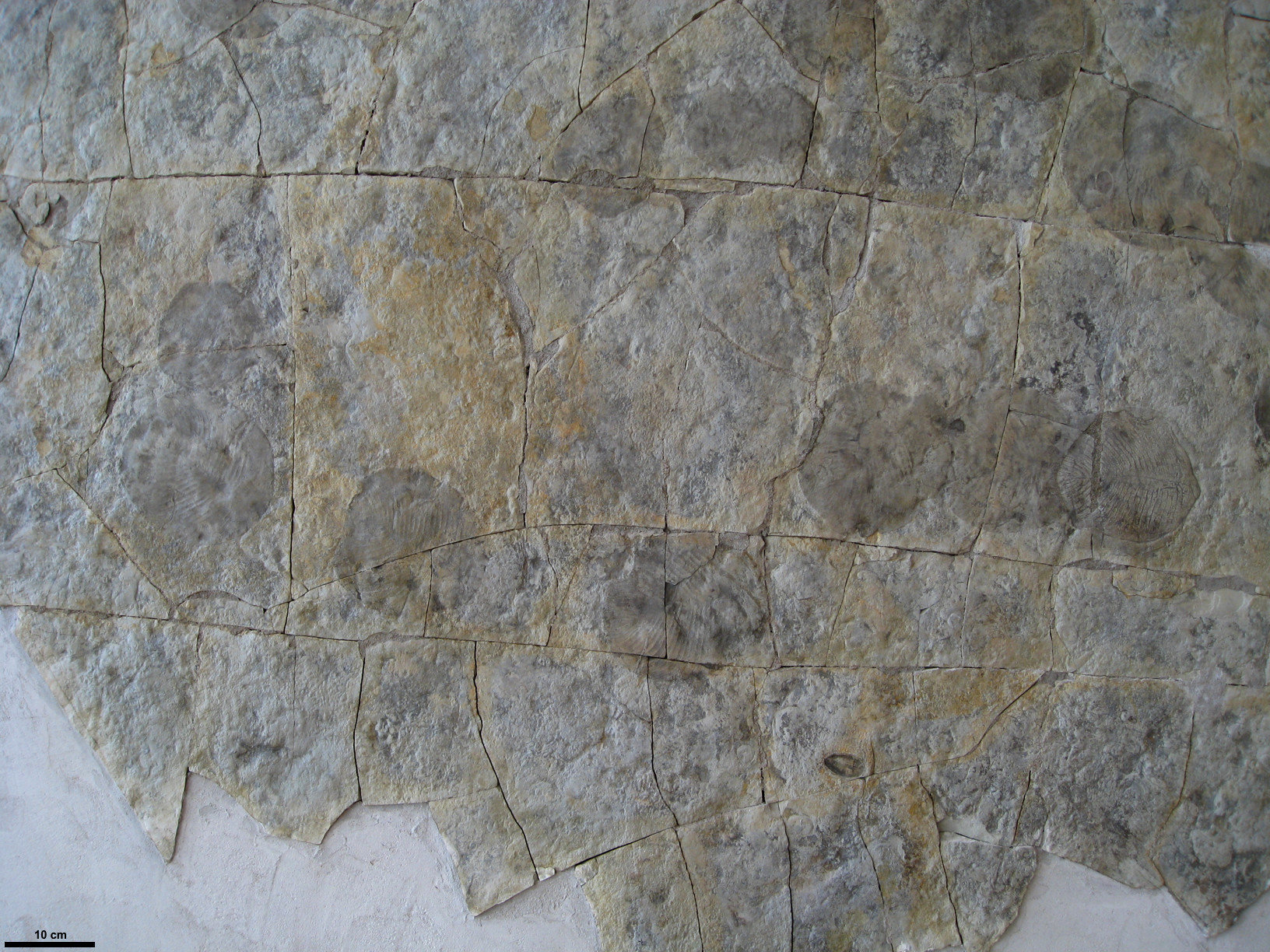
Specialized marine trace trackway, Yorgia, from the Ediacaran of northern Russia

The majority of fossil trackways are foot impressions on land, or subsurface water, but other types of creatures will leave distinctive impressions. Examples of creatures supported, or partially supported, in a water environment are known. The fossil "millipede-type" genus Arthropleura left its multi-legged/feet trackways on land.

=== Hominid trackways ===
==== Africa ====
===== Tanzania =====
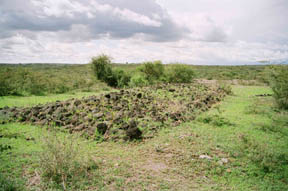
Laetoli Site, February 2006

Some of the earliest trackways for human ancestors have been discovered in Tanzania. The Laetoli trackway is famous for the hominin footprints preserved in volcanic ash. After the footprints were made in powdery ash, soft rain cemented the ash layer into tuff, preserving the prints. The hominid prints were produced by three individuals, one walking in the footprints of the other, making the original tracks difficult to discover. As the tracks lead in the same direction, they might have been produced by a group – but there is nothing else to support the common reconstruction of a nuclear family visiting the waterhole together.

===== South Africa =====
In South Africa, two ancient trackways have been found containing footprints, one at Langebaan and one at Nahoon. Both trackways occur in calcareous eolianites or hardened sand dunes. At Nahoon, trackways of at least five species of vertebrates, including three hominid footprints, are preserved as casts. The prints at Langebaan are the oldest human footprints, dated to approximately 117,000 years old.

==== Australia ====
===== New South Wales =====
Twenty six human fossil trackways have been found in the Willandra Lakes area adjacent to Lake Garnpung, consisting of 563 human footprints from 19,000 to 20,000 years ago.

=== Early Tetrapod ===
The earliest land creatures (actually land-marine coastal-riverine-marshland) left some of the first terrestrial trackways. They range from tetrapods to proto-reptilians and others.

A possible first connection of a trackway with the vertebrate that left it was published by Drs. Sebastian Voigt and David Berman and Amy Henrici in the 12 September 2007 issue of Journal of Vertebrate Paleontology. The paleontologists who made the connection were aided by unusually detailed trackways left in fine-grained Lower Permian mud of the Tambach Formation in central Germany, together with exceptionally complete fossilised skeletons in the same 290-million-year-old strata. They matched the two most common trackways with the two most common fossils, two reptile-like herbivores known as Diadectes absitus (with the trackway pseudonym Ichniotherium cottae) and Orobates pabsti (with the trackway pseudonym of Orobates pabsti).

The Permo-Carboniferous of Prince Edward Island, Canada contains trackways of tetrapods and stem-reptiles. Macrofloral and palynological information help date them.

Ireland hosts late Middle Devonian tetrapod trackways at three sites on Valentia Island within the Valentia Slate Formation.

The earliest fossil trackway of primitive tetrapods in Australia occurs in the Genoa River Gorge, Victoria, dating from the Devonian 350 million years ago.

=== Dinosaur trackways ===
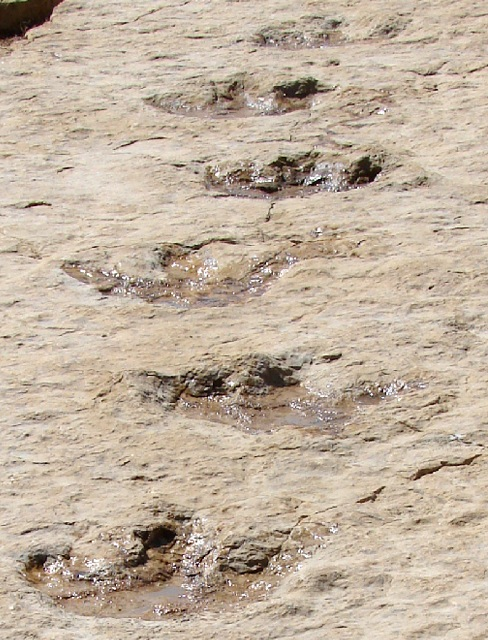
Arabian Peninsula dinosaur trackway

Dinosaurs lived on the continents before grasses evolved (the "Age of the Grasses" evolved with the "Age of the Mammals"); the dinosaurs lived in the Triassic, Jurassic, and Cretaceous and left many trackways, both from plant-eaters and the meat-eaters, in various layers of mud and sand.

With scientific analysis, dinosaur specialists are now analyzing tracks for the walking-speeds, or sprint-running speeds for all categories of dinosaurs, even to the large plant eaters, but especially the faster 3-toed meat hunters. Evidence of herding, as well as pack hunting are also being investigated.

==== Bolivia ====
- Cal Orck'o, Cretaceous park, Sucre, Bolivia
- From an investigation that began in the 1960s, it wasn't until December 2025 that paleontologists from Loma Linda University in California discovered 16,600 footprints left by theropods, the dinosaur group that includes the Tyrannosaurus rex. After six years of regular field visits, this finding sets the highest number of theropod footprints ever discovered in the world. The footprint sizes indicated that giant creatures roughly 10 meters (33 feet) tall, while also finding tiny theropod footprints the size of a chicken, 32 centimeters (1 foot) tall at the hip. Interestingly enough, the scientist who found it in 1960 wanted to prove to kids that those prints weren't made by a monster, but by a dinosaur.

==== Brazil ====
- Valley of the Dinosaurs, Paraíba, Brazil

==== Africa ====
===== Namibia =====
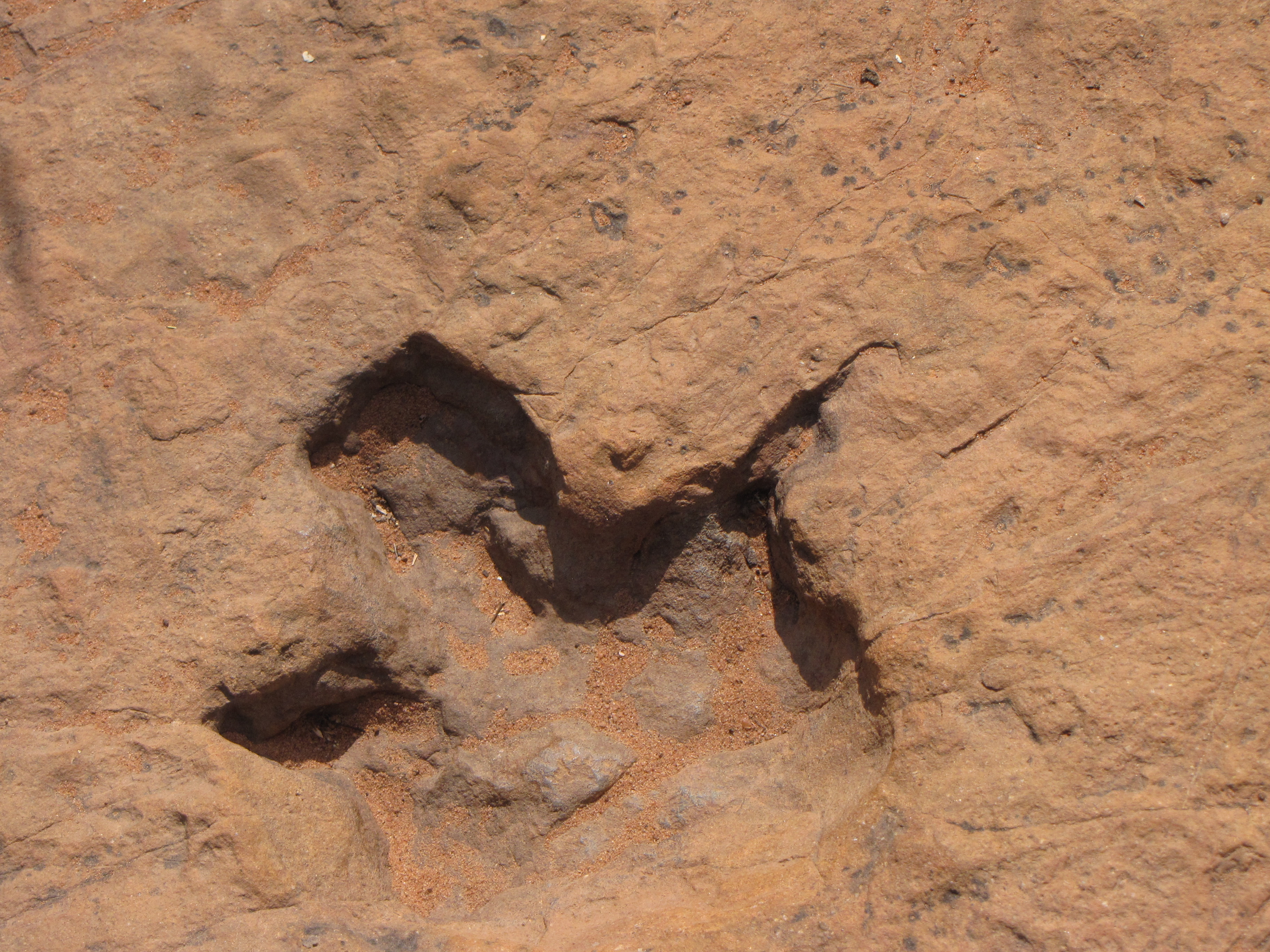
Dinosaur trace fossil of Otjihaenamparero

In north-central Namibia there is a dinosaur trackway in sandstone on what is now the private farm Otjihaenamparero. Larger footprints are of a ceratosauria and smaller ones of syntarsus. The prints are believed to be around 190 million years old.

===== Zimbabwe =====
In the Lower Zimbabwe Rift Valley there is a trackway in 140 Ma rose-coloured sandstone of Chewore Area. The small footprint size, with both manus and pes, implies that it is a trackway of a juvenile, a probable carnosaur.

==== North America ====
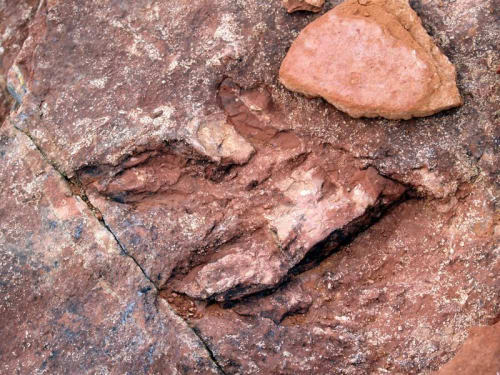
Probable Dilophosaurus footprint from Red Fleet State Park, northeastern Utah

The western regions of North America, especially the western border of the Western Interior Seaway, are common for dinosaur trackways. Wyoming has dinosaur trackways from the Late Cretaceous, 65 ma. (A model example of this 3-toed Wyoming trackway was made for presentation.)

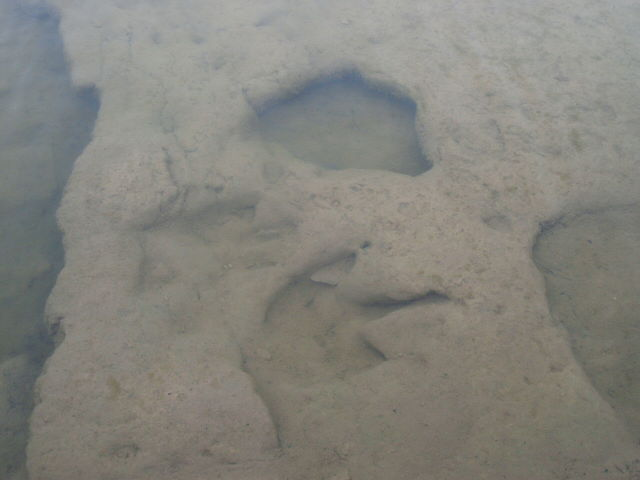
Theropod and sauropod tracks under water in the Paluxy River

In the United States, dinosaur footprints and trackways are found in the Glen Rose Formation, the most famous of these being the Paluxy River site in Dinosaur Valley State Park. These were the first sauropoda footprints scientifically documented, and were designated a US National Natural Landmark in 1969. Some are as large as about 3 feet across. The prints are thought to have been preserved originally in a tidal flat or a lagoon. There are tracks from two types of dinosaur. The first type of tracks are from a sauropod and were made by an animal of 30 to 50 feet in length, perhaps a brachiosaurid such as Pleurocoelus, and the second tracks by a theropoda, an animal of 20 to 30 feet in length, perhaps an Acrocanthosaurus. A variety of scenarios was proposed to explain the tracks, but most likely represent twelve sauropods "probably as a herd, followed somewhat later by three theropods that may or may not have been stalking – but that certainly were not attacking."

Other examples include:

- Dinosaur tracks, near Moab, Utah
- Dinosaur Footprints Reservation in Holyoke, Massachusetts, US
- Red Gulch Dinosaur Tracksite, Wyoming
- Prehistoric Trackways National Monument near Las Cruces, New Mexico
- Connecticut River Valley trackways, in New England
- Clayton Lake State Park dinosaur trackway near Clayton, New Mexico
- West Gold Hill Dinosaur Track in Uncompahgre National Forest near Ouray, Colorado

==== Asia ====
===== China =====
The Gansu dinosaur trackway located in the Liujiazia National Dinosaur Geopark in Yanguoxia, China contains hundreds of tracks including 245 dinosaur, 350 theropod, 364 sauropod and 628 ornithopod tracks among others.

===== Thailand =====
The Phu Pha Man National Park in Thailand contains one of the oldest dinosaur tracks to have been discovered in Asia. Discovered in January 2024, paleontologists from the Department of Mineral Resources have dated the tracks to around 225–220 million years old (the late Triassic period). The track contains traces of a variety of dinosaurs including theropods, sauropods, and archosaurs.

==== Australia ====
The Lark Quarry Trackway in Queensland contains three-toed tracks made by a herd of ornithopod dinosaurs crossing a river. It was once believed they respresented a large predator chasing a mixed flock of small ornithopods and theropods, but this was contested in 2011.

==== Europe ====
===== Portugal =====
- Lagosteiros Natural Monument, in Sesimbra, with theropod and ornithopod tracks from the Early Cretaceous.
- Aire Range Dinosaur Tracks Natural Monument near Torres Novas. In 1994 about 20 sauropod trackways from the Middle Jurassic were discovered in the Pedreira do Galinha quarry.

===== England =====
In a Bathonian limestone quarry site at Ardley, Oxfordshire more than 40 sets of footprints, with some trackways reaching up to 180 metres in length, were discovered in 1997. These prints are largely only preserved in replicas and photographic records due to quarrying and subsequent restoration. Theropod tracks have been tentatively assigned to the ichnogenus Megalosauripus, possibly from Megalosaurus. The sauropod tracks could be grouped into wide-gauge trackways, associated with early titanosauria or brachiosauridae, and narrow-gauge ones, possibly from Cetiosaurus or a basal diplodocoid. In 2024 at nearby Dewars Farm Quarry, five new extensive Middle Jurassic trackways dating back about 166 Ma were discovered, with evidence of more in the neighbourhood. The longest continuous trackway measured more than 150 metres. Four of the trackways were made by large sauropods, most likely again Cetiosaurus. The fifth one was identified as made by the carnivorous theropod Megalosaurus, based on its distinctive three-toed feet with claws. One area of the site shows the carnivore and herbivore tracks crossing over, suggesting the predator followed up on the steps of the sauropod.

A newly described dinosaur track assemblage from the Middle Jurassic Burniston Footprint Bed in Yorkshire provides rare evidence of different dinosaur species occupying the same environment at roughly the same time. Researchers Romano, Lomax and Taylor identified a large herbivorous ornithopod footprint alongside numerous smaller theropod tracks, some of which appear to overlap the larger print. The findings suggest they may have interacted and offer valuable insights into dinosaur behaviour, sociality and community structure in Jurassic Britain.

=== Mammal trackways ===
Mammal trackways are among the least common trackways. Mammals were not often in mud, or riverine environments; they were more often in forestlands or grasslands. Thus the earlier tetrapods or proto-tetrapods would yield the most fossil trackways. The Walchia forest of Brule, Nova Scotia has an example of an in situ Walchia forest, and tetrapod trackways that extended over some period of time through the forest area.

==== United States ====
A 1.5km-long Late Pleistocene Age trackway of human (child and adult) fossilized footprints, as well as mammoth and giant ground sloth tracks have been found at White Sands National Park near Alamogordo, New Mexico.

==== Australia ====
A recent marsupial trackway site at Colac in the Australian state of Victoria contains marsupial trackways as well as kangaroo and wallaby tracks.

=== Pterosaur trackways ===
==== France ====
Pterosaur Beach was, at the end of the Jurassic era, a mudflat, flooded at high tide, on a marine lagoon in a gulf that opened on the Atlantic Ocean between Bordeaux and the island of Oléron. On it, animals foraged for food. The site has hundreds of fossilized trackways.

== Gallery of images ==
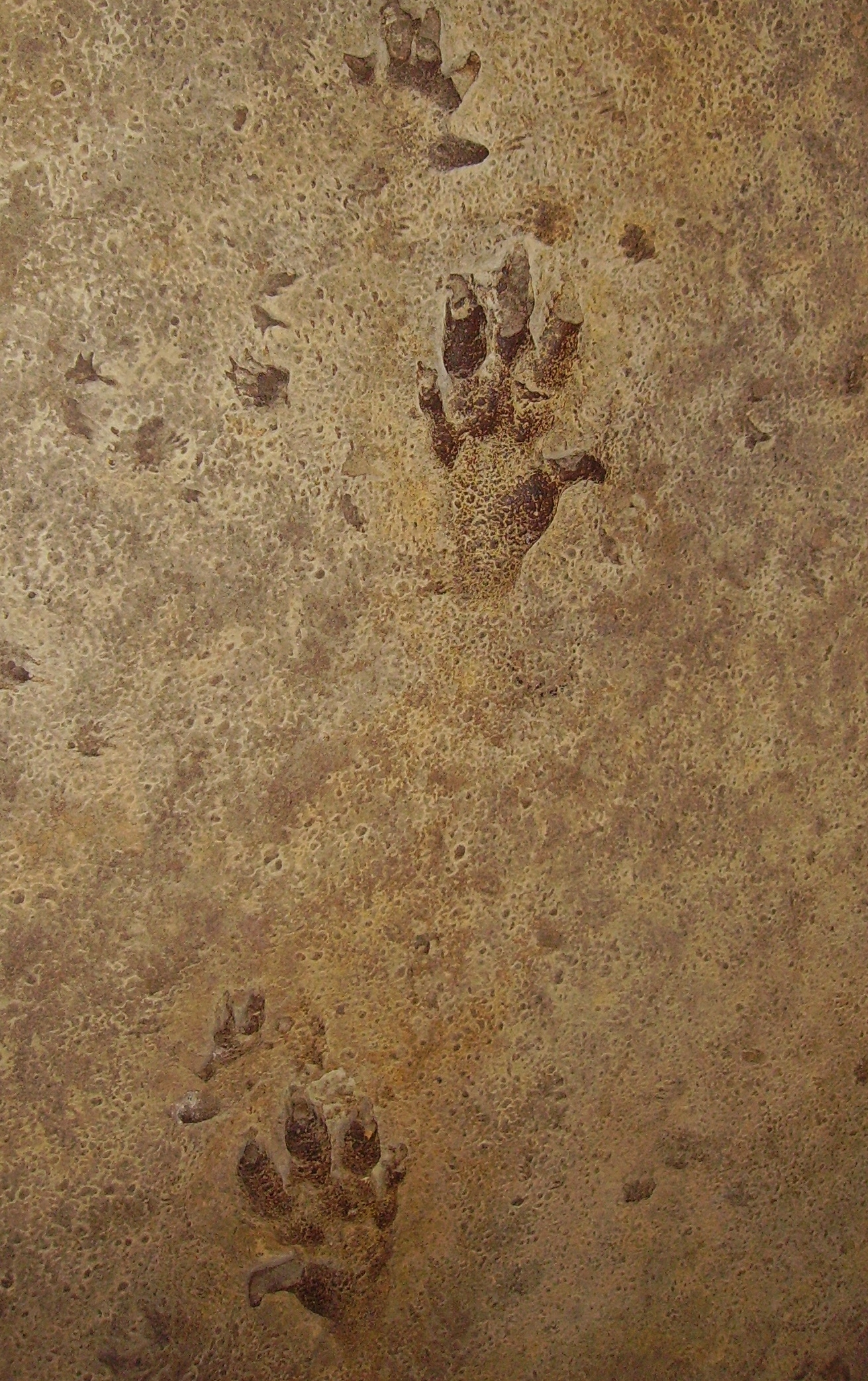
Cheirotherium trace fossil, displayed in Oxford University Museum of Natural History

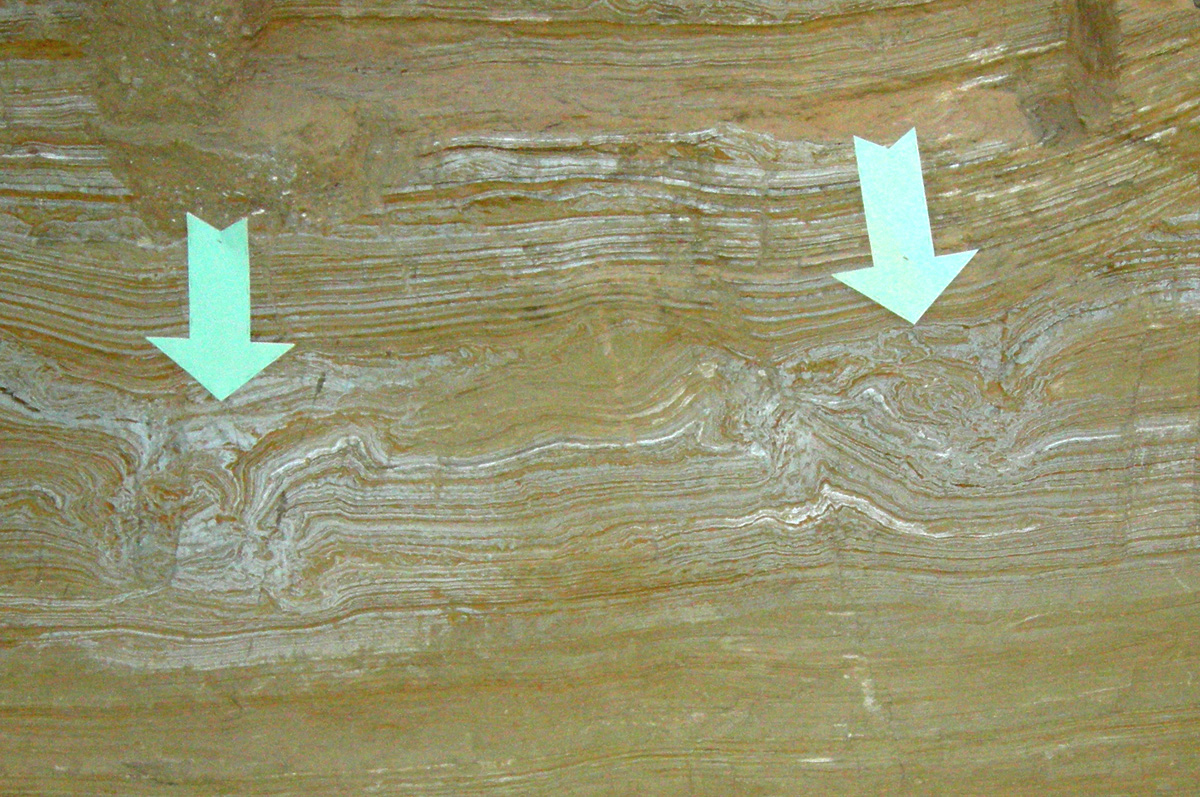
Cross-section of Pleistocene mammoth footprints at The Mammoth Site, Hot Springs, South Dakota

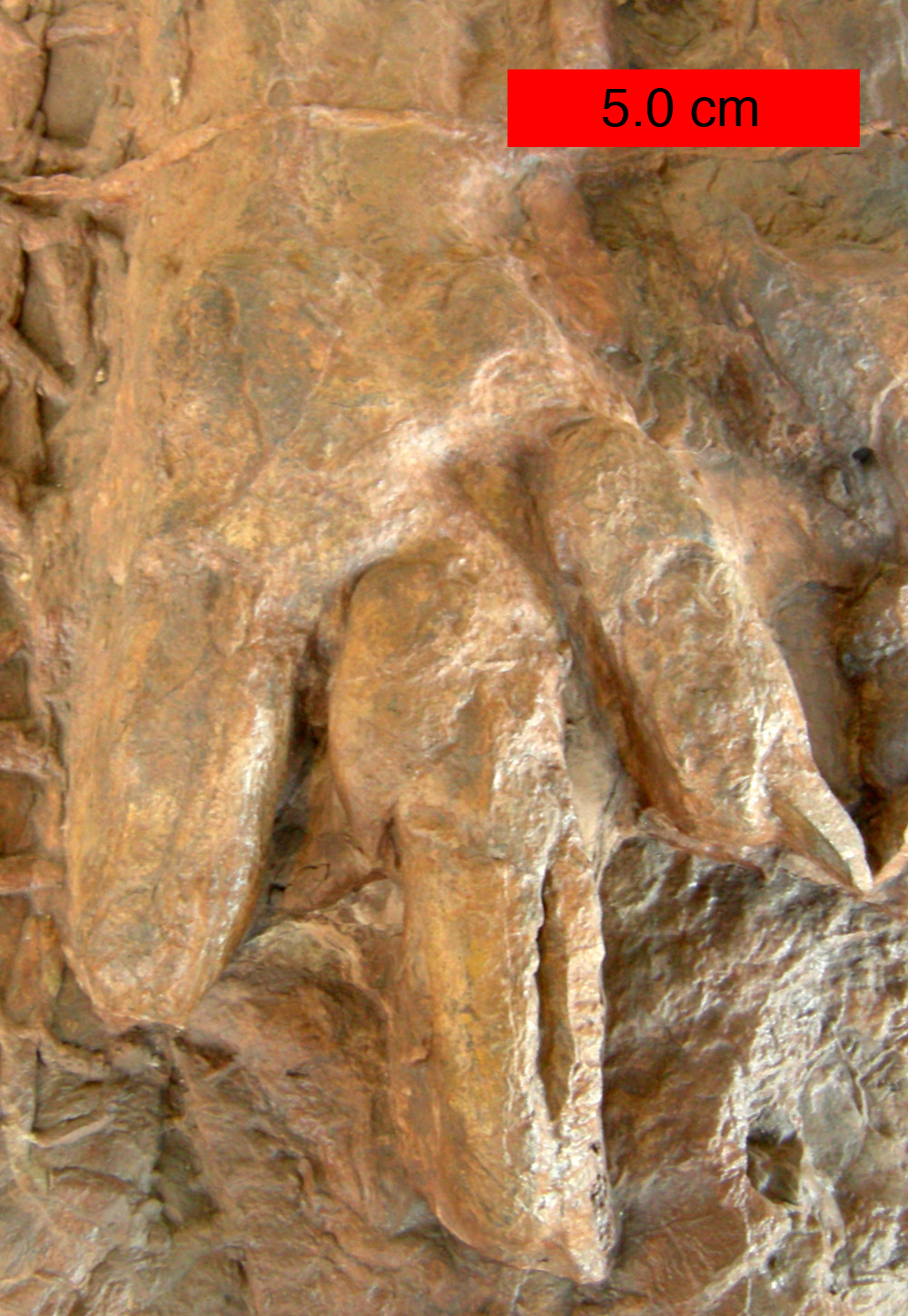
Eubrontes, a dinosaur footprint in the Lower Jurassic Moenave Formation at the St. George Dinosaur Discovery Site at Johnson Farm, southwestern Utah

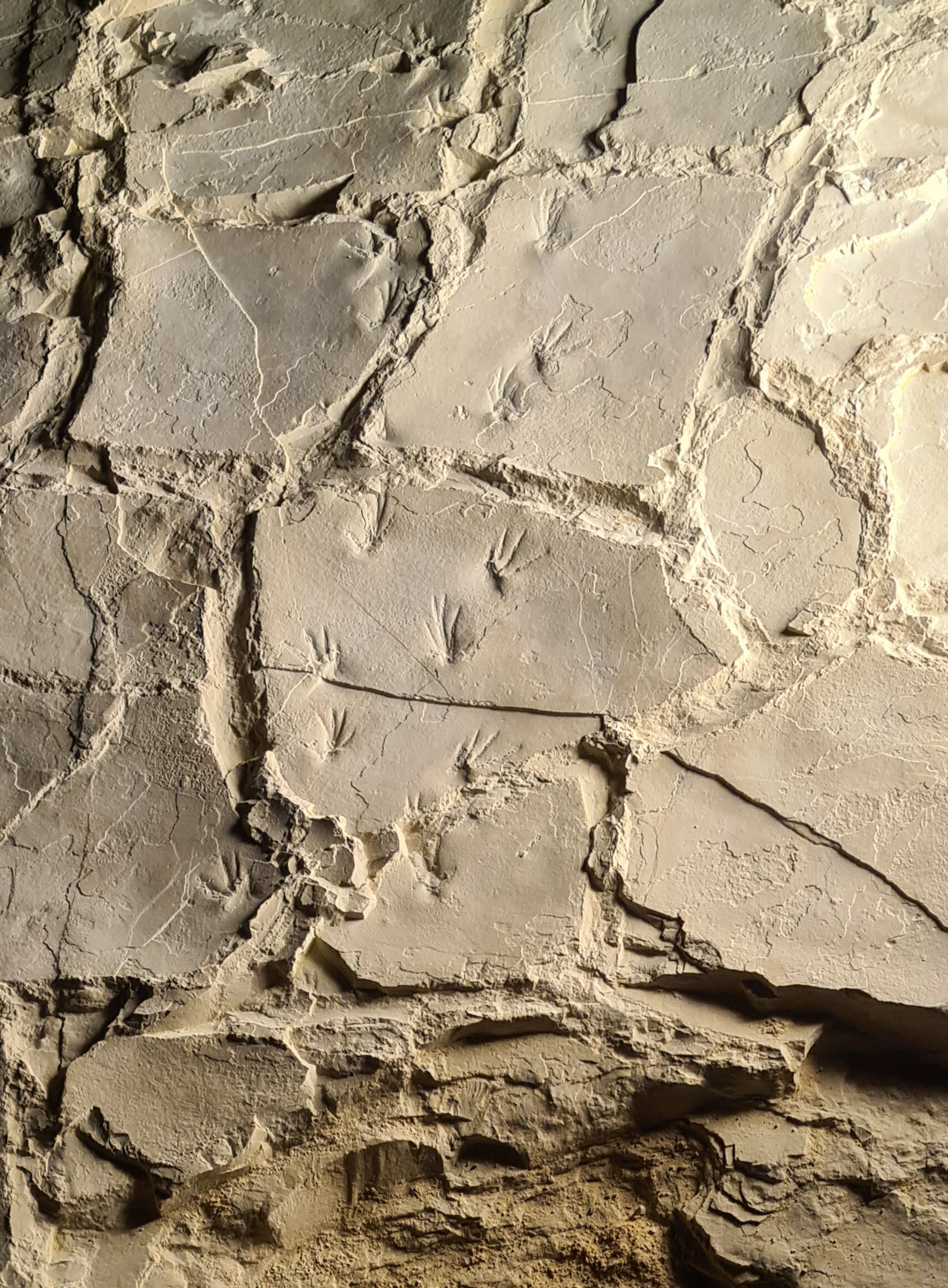
Fossil pterosaur footprints, Pterosaur Beach (France)

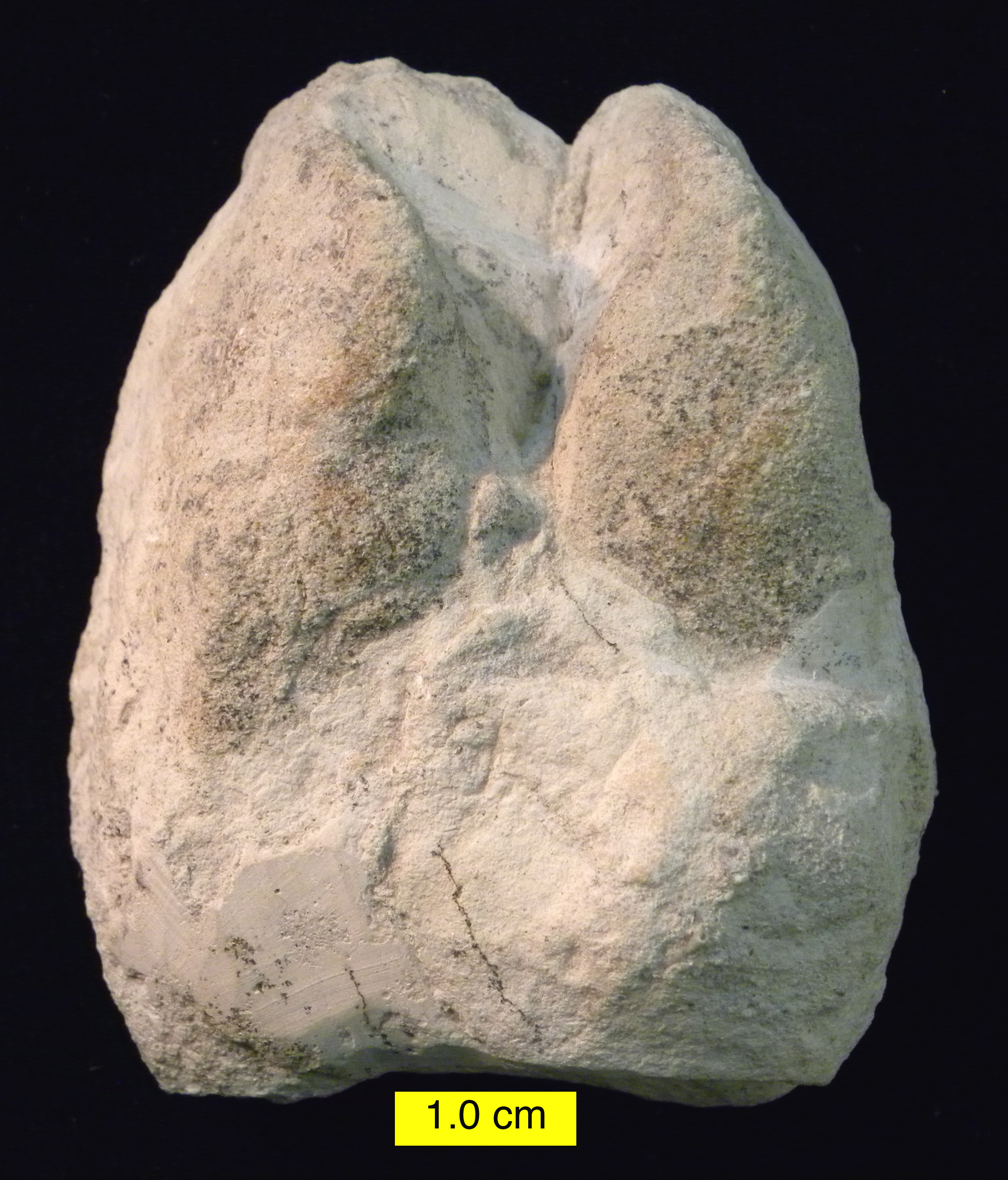
Cameloid footprint (Lamaichnum alfi Sarjeant and Reynolds, 1999; convex hyporelief) from the Barstow Formation (Miocene) of Rainbow Basin, California

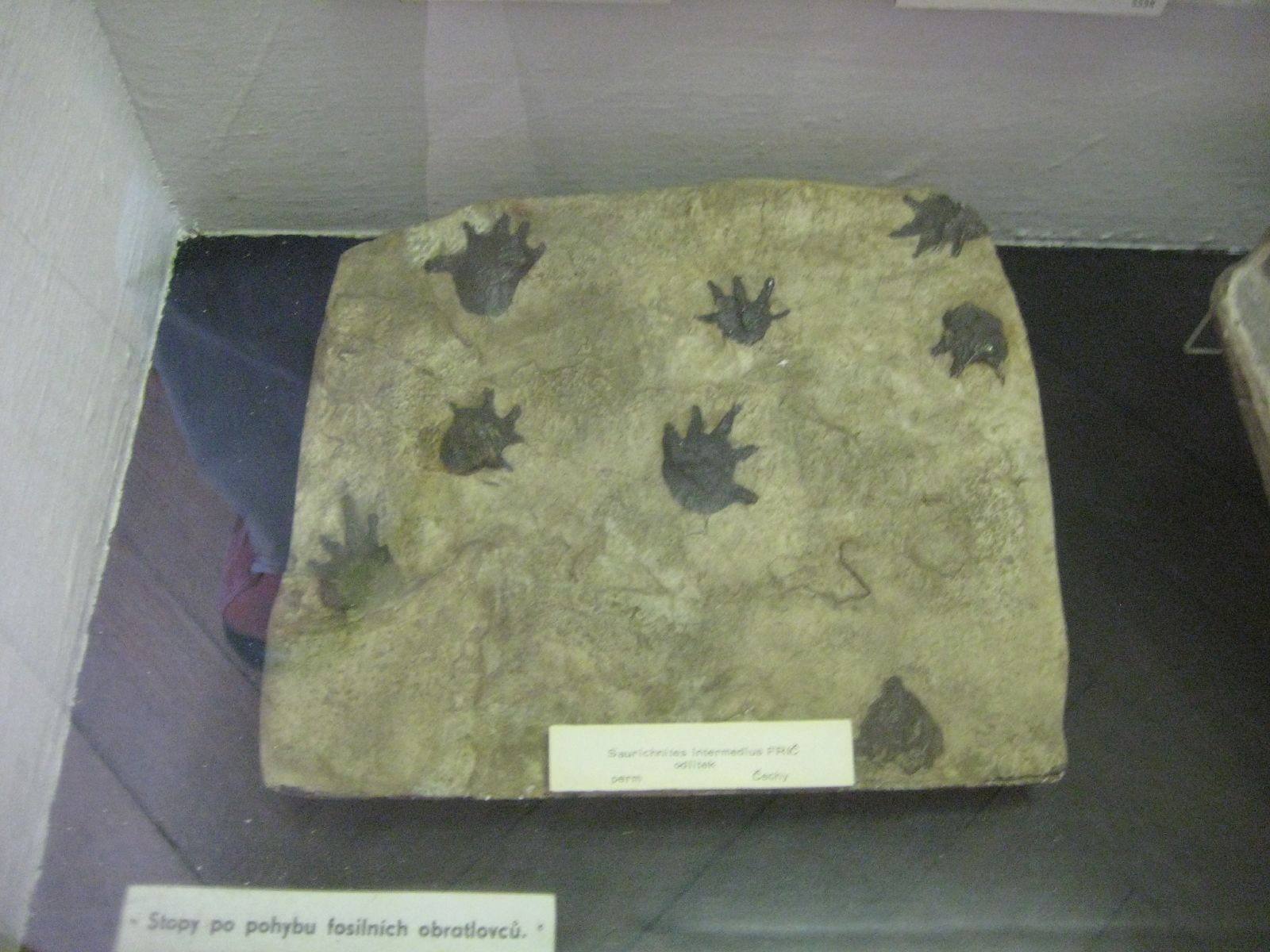
Saurichnites intermedius

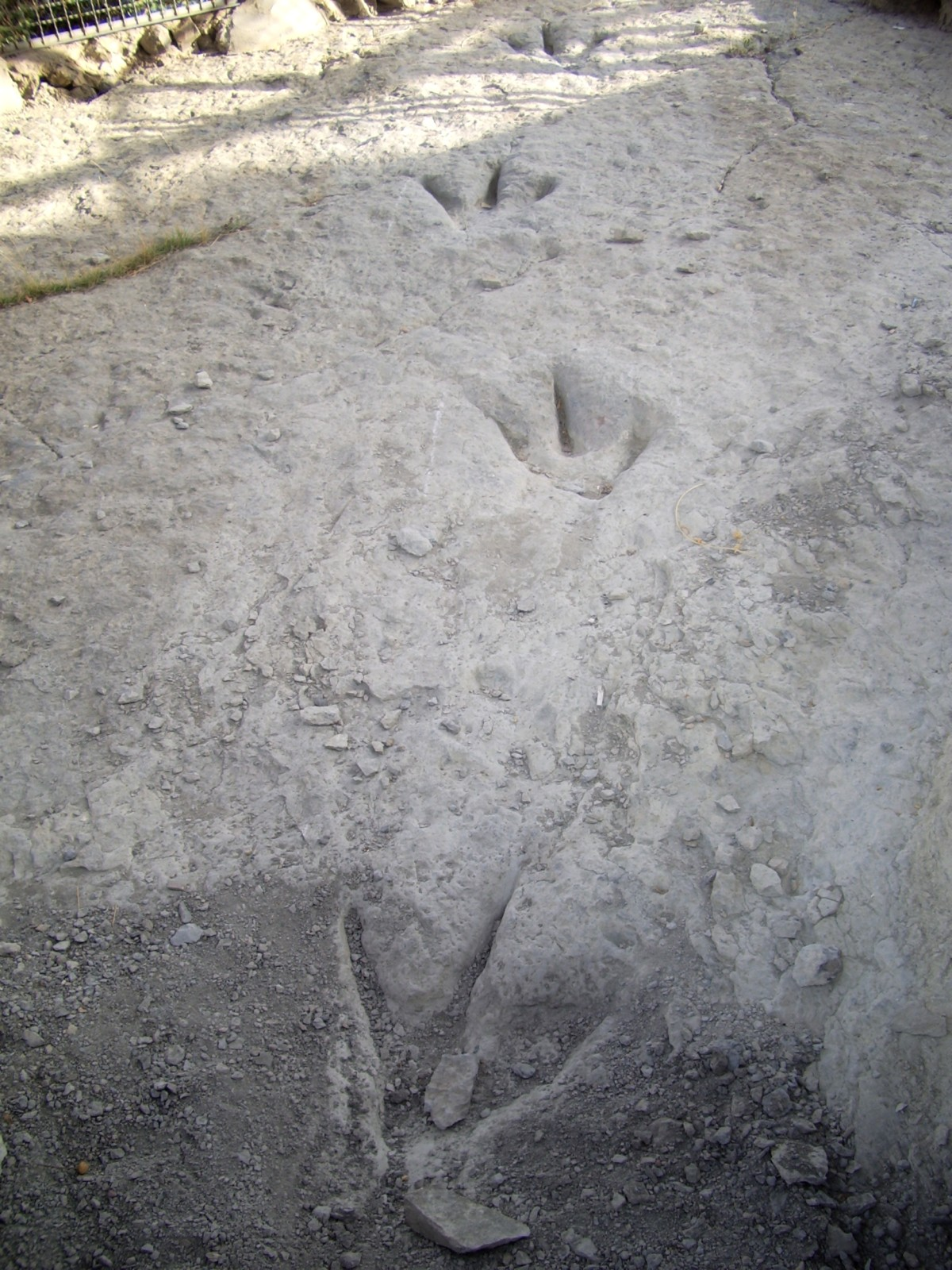
A carnivorous theropod trackway from the Cretaceous near Enciso, La Rioja, Spain

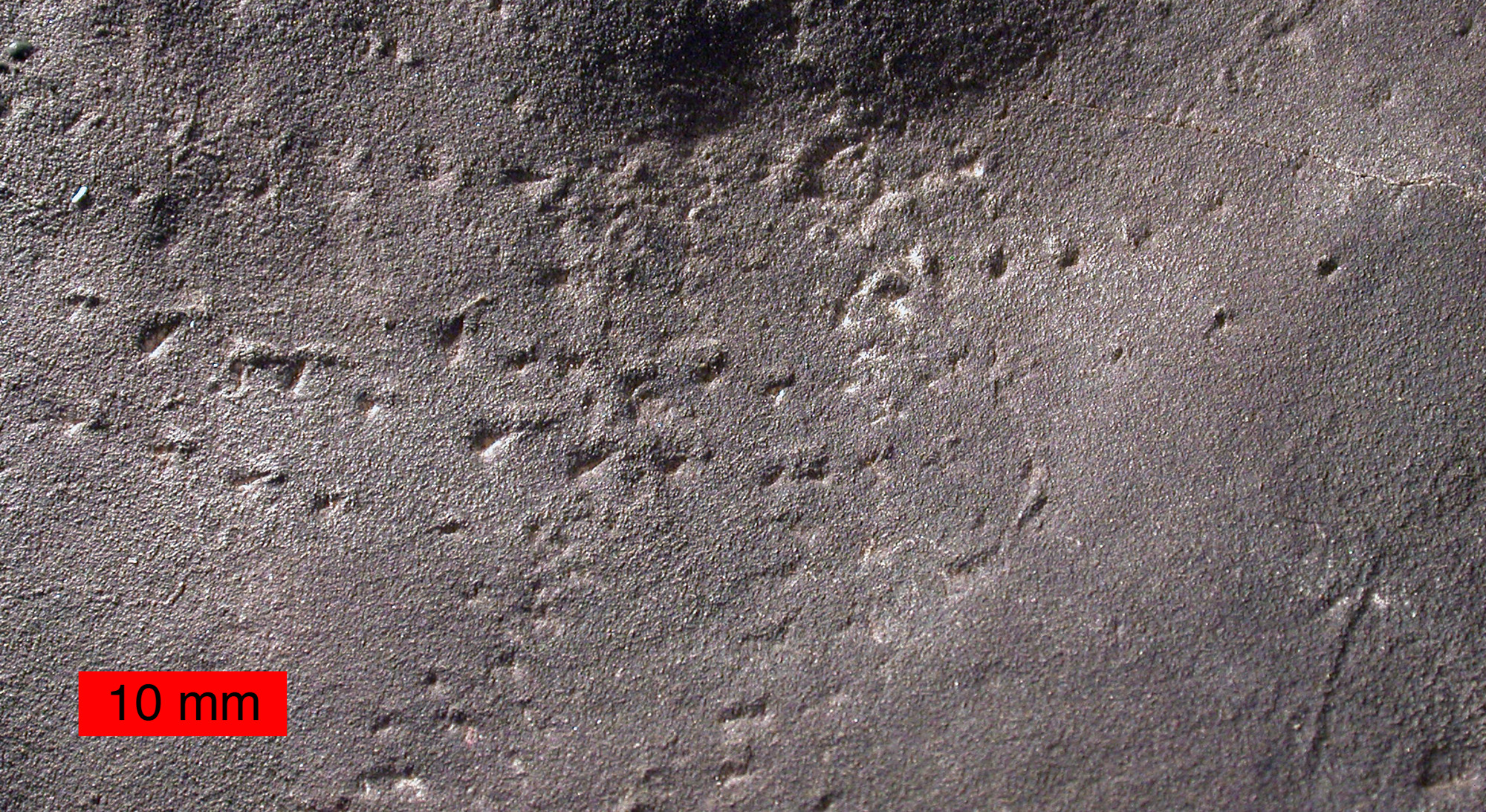
Petalichnus, arthropod walking traces. Devonian of northeastern Ohio.

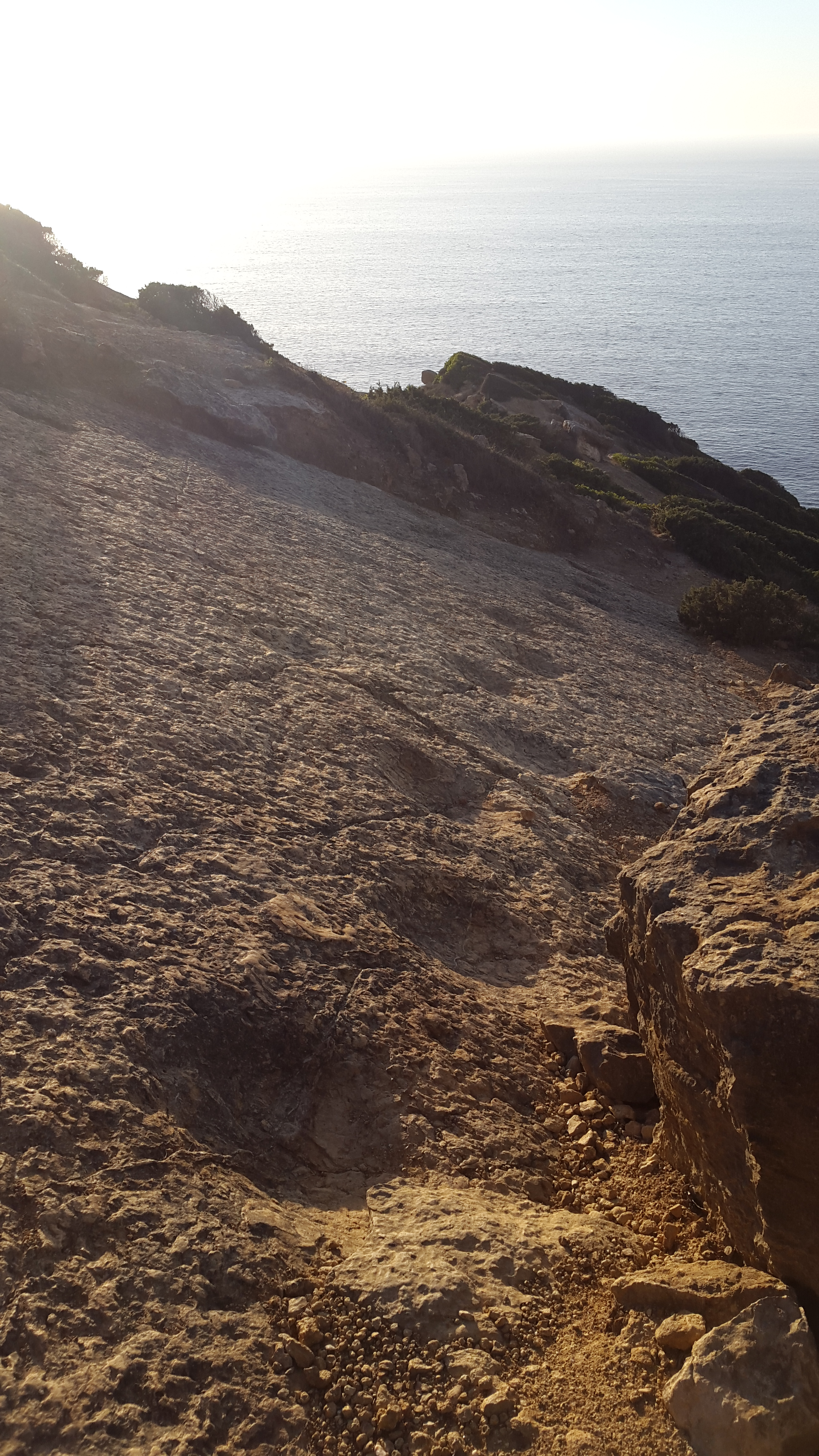
The main dinosaur trackway at the Lagosteiros Natural Monument, Portugal

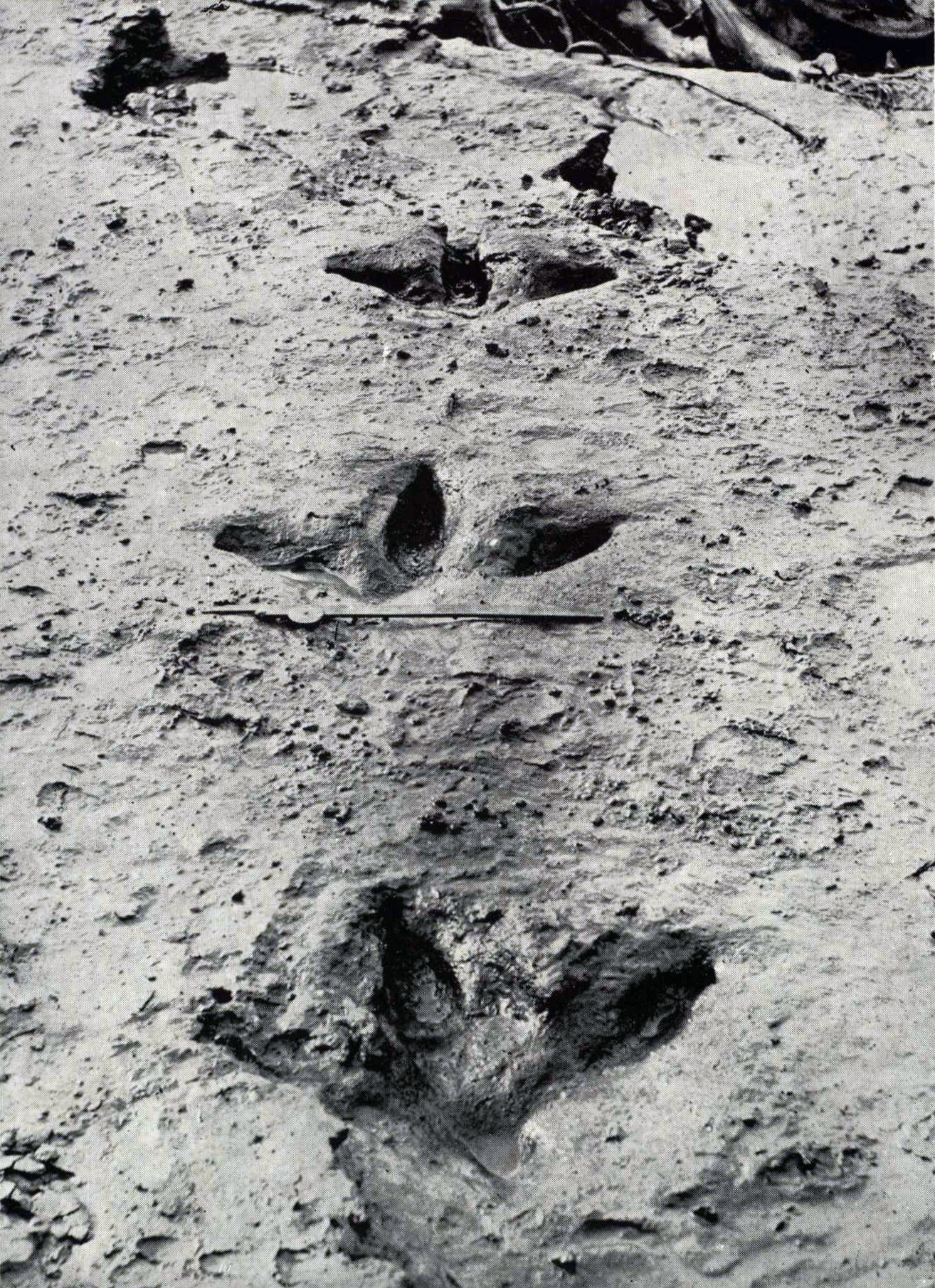
Moa footprints near the Manawatu River, New Zealand

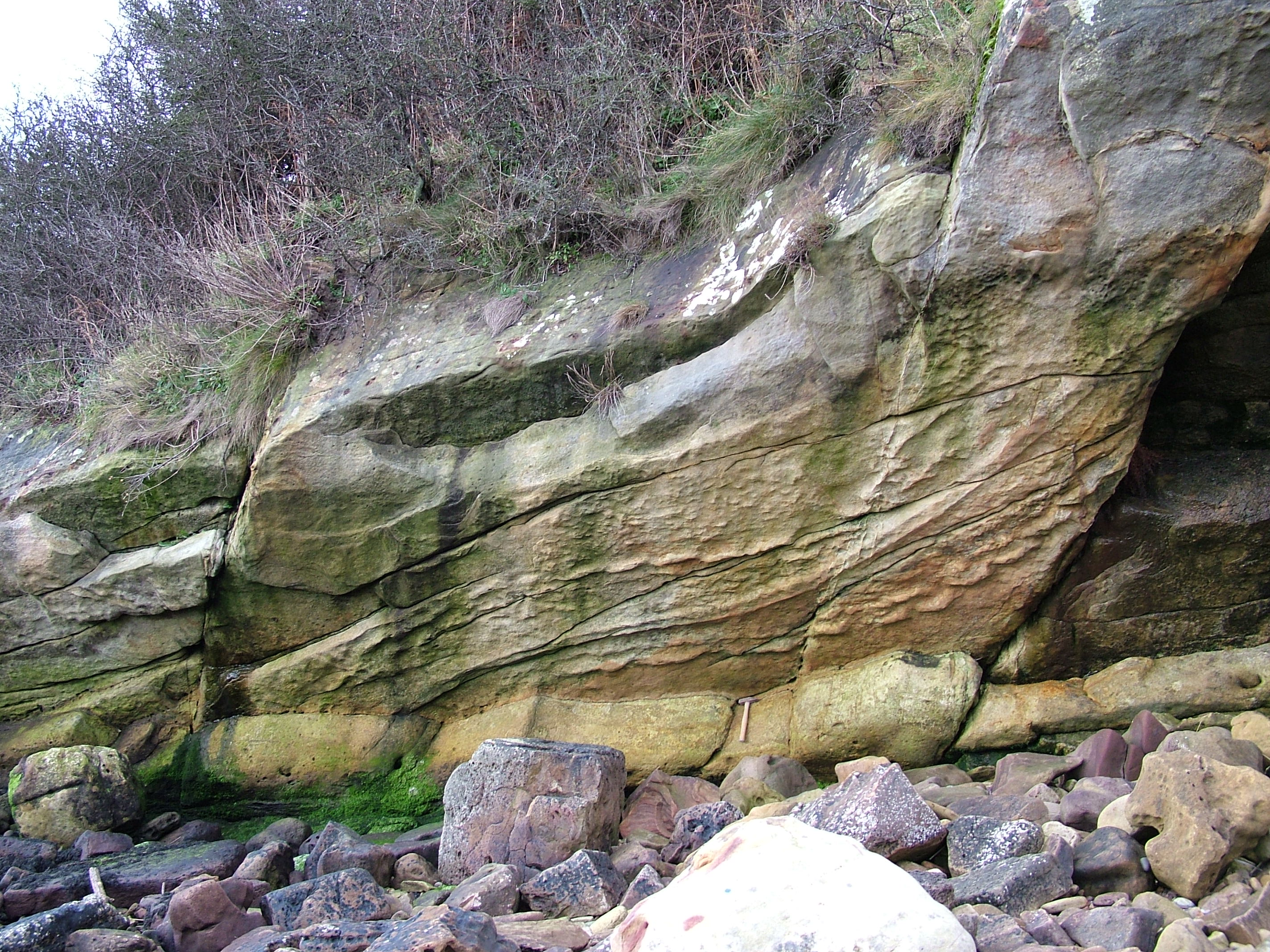
Hibbertopterus trackway: negative relief image, a groove infilled by sand appears as a ridgeline

== See also ==
- Ichnites, a type of ichnite
- List of stratigraphic units with dinosaur tracks
- Formations with ichnites
- List of non-Dinosauria fossil trackway articles
- List of fossil sites
