= Shaunavon Formation =

- Stratigraphic range: Bathonian
- Type: Geological formation
- Sub-units: Upper Shaunavon; Lower Shaunavon
- Underlies: Sawtooth Formation
- Overlies: Gravelbourg Formation
- Thickness: up to 48 metres (160 ft)

Lithology
- Primary: Limestone
- Other: Sandstone, shale

Location
- Coordinates: 49.464°N 107.514°W
- Region: WCSB
- Country: Canada

Type section
- Named for: Shaunavon, Saskatchewan
- Named by: R.L. Milner and G.E. Thomas, 1954

The Shaunavon Formation is a stratigraphic unit of Bathonian age in the Western Canadian Sedimentary Basin.

It takes the name from the town of Shaunavon, and was first described in the Tidewater A.O. Eastend Crown No. 1 well, drilled south-west of the settlement, by R.L. Milner and G.E. Thomas in 1954.

== Lithology ==
The Shaunavon Formation is composed of two members. The lower member consists of buff microcrystalline massive limestone in the lower part with an oolitic bed at the top. The upper member consists of calcareous sandstone and oolitic limestone, shell coquina and argillaceous limestone with interbeds of gray and green shale. Dolomitisation can occur in both members. Lenticular beds separated by sedimentation breaks are common in the upper member. Channels also occur in the upper Shaunavon.

=== Hydrocarbon production ===
Oil is produced from the Shaunavon Formation in south-western Saskatchewan.

== Distribution ==
The Shaunavon Formation reaches a maximum thickness of 48 metres (160 ft). It occurs in the sub-surface in south-western Saskatchewan. In the Williston Basin it appears present in Montana and North Dakota as the lower part of the Sawtooth Formation and Piper Formation. East of Weyburn, it grades into the shaley facies of the Melita Formation of Manitoba.

== Relationship to other units ==
The Shaunavon Formation is conformably overlain by the Sawtooth Formation and conformably overlays the Gravelbourg Formation.

It is equivalent to the Sawtooth Formation in southern Alberta, as well as to the Bowes member and Firemoon Member of the Piper Formation in Montana.
