= Watrous Formation =

Stratigraphical unit in Canada

- Stratigraphic range: Triassic to Jurassic
- Type: Geological formation
- Sub-units: Upper Watrous; Lower Watrous
- Thickness: up to 110 metres (360 ft)

Lithology
- Primary: Shale, anhydrite

Location
- Coordinates: 51.2826°N 105.8801°W
- Region: WCSB
- Country: Canada

Type section
- Named for: Watrous, Saskatchewan
- Named by: R.L. Milner and G E. Thomas, 1954

The Watrous Formation is a stratigraphic unit of Triassic to Jurassic age in the Western Canadian Sedimentary Basin.

It takes the name from the town of Watrous, and was first described in well Tidewater Davidson Crown No. 1, located south-west from the settlement, by R.L. Milner and G E. Thomas in 1954.

== Lithology ==
=== Subdivisions ===
The Watrous Formation is divided into a lower and an upper member. The Lower Watrous is composed of red shale and mudstones with laminated anhydrite interbeds and sandstone and conglomerate in the base. The Upper Watrous is composed of massive anhydrite and only occurs at the rims of the depositional pool.

== Distribution ==
The Watrous Formation occurs in southern Saskatchewan to the border with Manitoba and stretches south into North Dakota. It reaches a maximum thickness of 110 metres (360 ft) on the North Dakota border, and thins out to zero at the margins of the depositional pool.

== Relationship to other units ==
The Watrous Formation fills in the Paleozoic erosional surface, resting disconformably on older strata. It is equivalent to Amaranth Formation in Manitoba and represents a northern extension of the Spearfish Formation in North Dakota. The Upper Watrous can be correlated with the Nesson Formation.
