= Ellis Group =

Geological group in Alberta, Canada and Montana, U.S.

- Stratigraphic range: Bajocian-Oxfordian
- Type: Geological group
- Sub-units: Swift, Rierdon, Piper & Sawtooth Formations
- Underlies: Mannville Group
- Overlies: Rundle Group & Shaunavon Formation
- Thickness: up to 150 m (490 ft)

Lithology
- Primary: Shale, sandstone
- Other: Siltstone, limestone

Location
- Coordinates: 48.0°N 108.6°W
- Approximate paleocoordinates: 40.9°N 49.2°W
- Region: Alberta, Saskatchewan, Montana, Wyoming
- Country: Canada, United States
- Extent: WCSB

Type section
- Named for: Fort Ellis
- Named by: A.C. Peale
- Year defined: 1893
- Ellis Group (Canada)

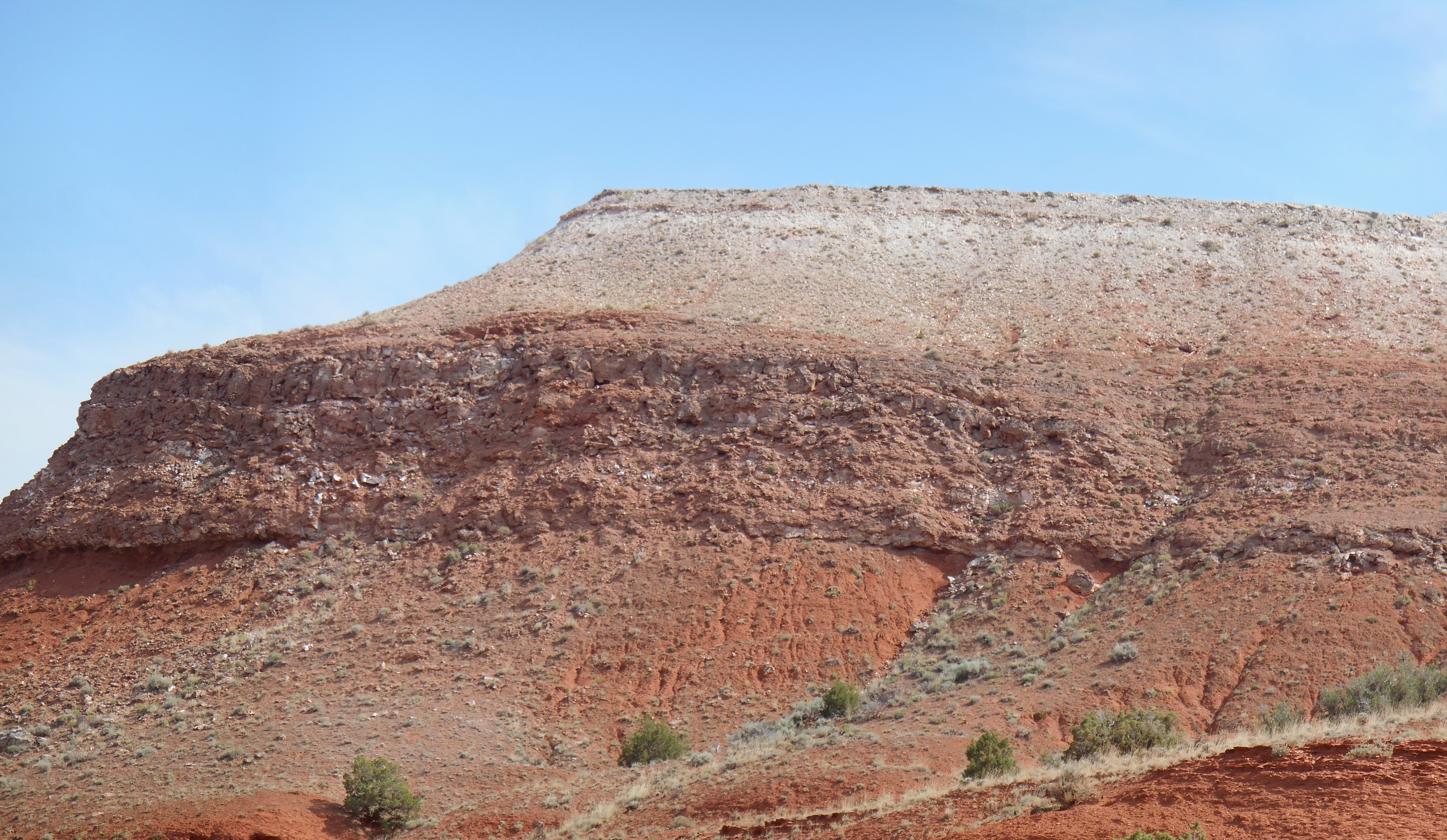
Gypsum bed in the Piper Formation, Big Horn Basin of Wyoming

The Ellis Group is a stratigraphic unit of Bajocian-Oxfordian age in Alberta, Saskatchewan, Montana and Wyoming in the Western Canadian Sedimentary Basin. It takes the name from Fort Ellis, Montana, and was first described in outcrop in the Rocky Creek Canyon by A.C. Peale in 1893.

== Lithology ==
The Ellis Group is composed of shale and sandstones deposited in a marine and transitional environment.

=== Hydrocarbon production ===
Oil is produced from the Sawtooth Formation in southeastern Alberta.

== Distribution ==
The Ellis Group laterally occurs in the subsurface in southern Alberta and northern and central Montana. It is typically 80 metres (260 ft), but thickens on either side of the Sweetgrass Arch and reaches up to 150 metres (490 ft) in southeastern Alberta.

== Subdivisions ==
The Ellis Group includes the following formations, from top to bottom:

Sub-unit	Age	Lithology	Max. thickness	Notes
Swift Formation	Oxfordian	marine shale, transitional shale, siltstone and sandstone	41 m (130 ft)	
Rierdon Formation	Bathonian to Callovian	marine shale and limestone	60 m (200 ft)	
Sawtooth Formation	Bajocian to Bathonian	quartzose sandstone with shale	41 m (130 ft)	
Piper Formation	Middle Jurassic	sandy limestone (top) papery shale siltstone and shale grey limestone white gypsum (base)	23 m (80 ft)	

== Relationship to other units ==
The Ellis Group is unconformably overlain by the shales and sandstones of the Mannville Group and rests on the carbonates of the Rundle Group. It grades westwards to the shales of the Fernie Group, and eastwards to the shale, sandstones and limestones of the Vanguard and Shaunavon Formations.
