= List of fossiliferous stratigraphic units in Wyoming =

This article contains a list of fossil-bearing stratigraphic units in the state of Wyoming, U.S.

== Sites ==
Group or Formation	Period	Notes
Almond Formation	Cretaceous	
Almy Formation	Paleogene	
Amsden Formation	Carboniferous	
Arikaree Formation	Neogene	
Ash Hollow Formation	Neogene	
Aspen Shale	Cretaceous	
Aycross Formation	Paleogene	
Beartooth Butte Formation	Devonian	
Bell Springs Formation	Triassic	
Belle Fourche Formation	Cretaceous	
Benton Formation	Cretaceous	
Bighorn Formation	Ordovician	
Bridger Formation	Paleogene	
Brule Formation	Paleogene	
Brule Formation	Paleogene	
Carlile Shale	Cretaceous	
Casper Formation	Permian, Carboniferous	
Chadron Formation	Paleogene	
Chugwater Group/Alcova Limestone	Triassic	
Chugwater Group/Crow Mountain Formation	Triassic	
Chugwater Group/Popo Agie Formation	Triassic	
Chugwater Group/Red Peak Formation	Triassic	
Cloverly Formation	Cretaceous	
Cody Shale	Cretaceous	
Colorado Formation	Cretaceous	
Colorado Group/Graneros Shale	Cretaceous	
Colorado Group/Mowry Shale	Cretaceous	
Colter Formation	Neogene	
Dakota Formation	Cretaceous	
Deadwood Formation	Ordovician, Cambrian	
Dinwoody Formation	Triassic	
Dry Creek Shale	Cambrian	
DuNoir Formation	Cambrian	
DuNoir Limestone	Cambrian	
Eagle Formation	Cretaceous	
Evanston Formation	Paleogene	
Fall River Sandstone	Cretaceous	
Ferris Formation	Paleogene, Cretaceous	
Fort Union Formation	Paleogene	
Fowkes Formation	Paleogene	
Frontier Formation	Cretaceous	
Gallatin Formation	Cambrian	
Gartra Formation	Triassic	
Gering Formation	Paleogene	
Goose Egg Formation	Permian	
Green River Formation	Paleogene	
Gros Ventre Formation	Cambrian	
Gypsum Springs Formation	Jurassic	
Hailey Shale	Cretaceous	
Hanna Formation	Paleogene	
Harebell Formation	Cretaceous	
Harrison Formation	Miocene	
Hoback Formation	Paleogene	
Iles Formation	Cretaceous	
Indian Meadows Formation	Paleogene	
Jelm Formation	Triassic	
Lamar River Formation	Paleogene	
Lance Formation	Cretaceous	
Laramie Formation	Cretaceous	
Lebo Formation	Paleogene	
Madison Group/Lodgepole Formation and Mission Canyon Formation	Mississippian	
Mancos Shale	Cretaceous	
Marsland Beds Formation	Neogene	
Medicine Bow Formation	Cretaceous	
Mesaverde Formation	Cretaceous	
Mesaverde Group/Almond Formation	Cretaceous	
Meteetse Formation	Cretaceous	
Middle Variegated Sequence Formation	Paleogene	
Minnekahta Formation	Permian	
Monroe Creek Formation	Paleogene	
Montana Group/Fox Hills Formation	Cretaceous	
Montana Group/Pierre Shale	Cretaceous	
Morrison Formation	Jurassic	
Mowry Shale	Cretaceous	
Newcastle Sandstone	Cretaceous	
Niobrara Formation	Cretaceous	
North Park Formation	Neogene	
Ogallala Formation	Neogene	
Open Door Formation	Cambrian	
Open Door Limestone	Cambrian	
Park City Formation	Permian	
Park Shale	Cambrian	
Pass Peak Formation	Paleogene	
Phosphoria Formation	Permian	
Pierre Shale	Cretaceous	
Pinyon Conglomerate Formation	Cretaceous	
Polecat Bench Formation	Paleogene	
Puerco Formation	Paleogene	
Rock Springs Formation	Cretaceous	
Satanka Formation	Permian	
Sepulcher Formation	Paleogene	
Shedhorn Formation	Permian	
Shedhorn Sandstone	Permian	
Shooting Iron Formation	Pliocene	
Snowy Range Formation	Cambrian	
Split Rock Formation	Neogene	
Sundance Formation	Jurassic	
Tatman Formation	Paleogene	
Teewinot Formation	Neogene	
Telegraph Creek Formation	Cretaceous	
Tepee Trail Formation	Paleogene	
Thaynes Formation	Triassic	
Thomas Fork Formation	Cretaceous	
Twin Creek Formation	Jurassic	
Twin Creek Limestone	Jurassic	
Wagon Bed Formation	Paleogene	
Wapiti Formation	Paleogene	
Wasatch Formation	Paleogene	
Washakie Formation	Paleogene	
White River Formation	Paleogene	
Wiggins Formation	Paleogene	
Willwood Formation	Paleogene	
Wind River Formation	Paleogene	
Woodside Formation	Triassic	

== See also ==
- Paleontology in Wyoming
