= Chugwater Formation =

Mapped bedrock unit in the United States

Chugwater Formation (Group)
- Stratigraphic range: Triassic
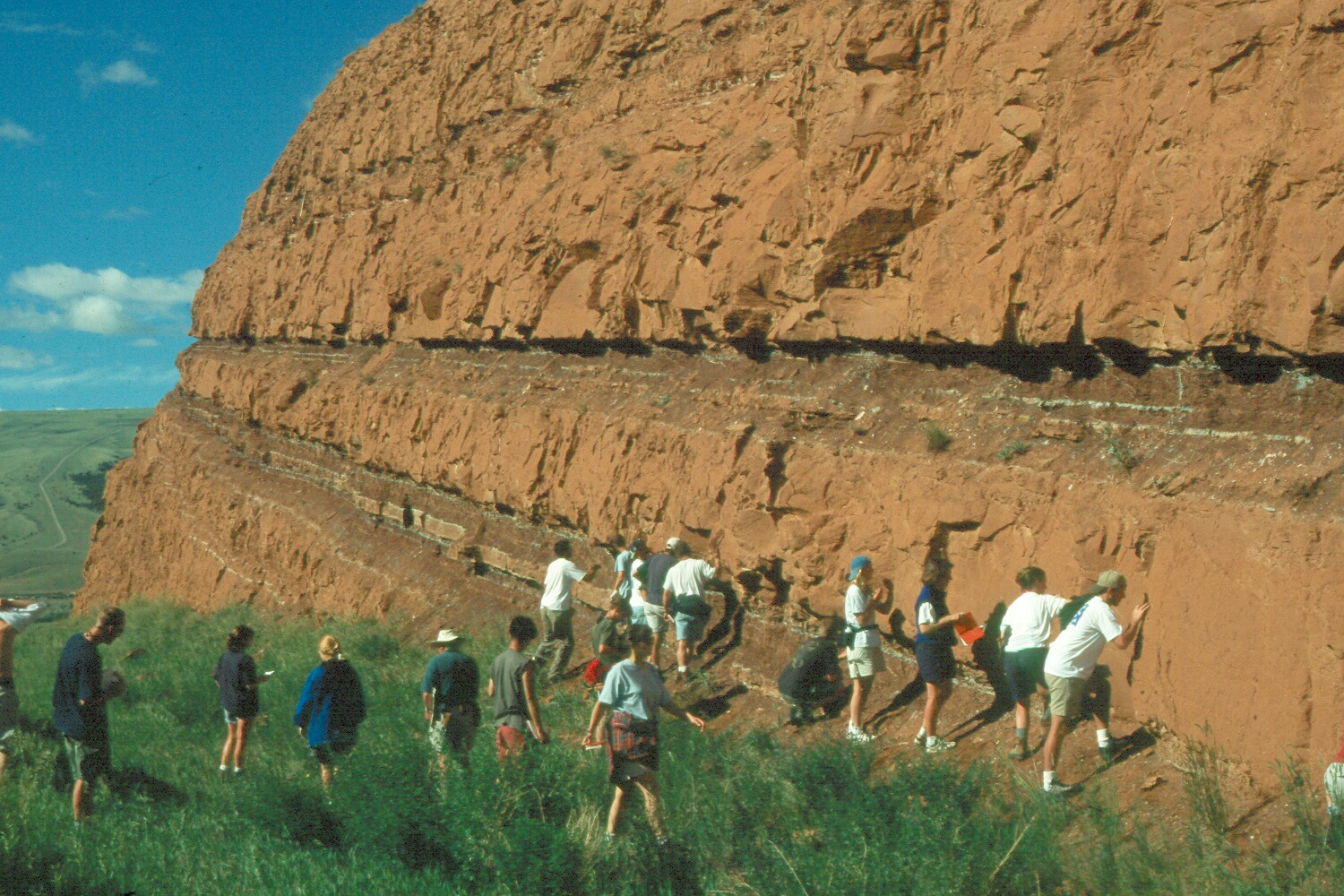
- Outcrop of Chugwater Group near Thermopolis, Wyoming
- Type: sedimentary
- Underlies: Nugget Sandstone, Morrison Formation
- Overlies: Dinwoody Formation, Goose Egg Formation

Lithology
- Primary: sandstone
- Other: shale, gypsum, limestone

Location
- Extent: Wyoming, Colorado, Montana

Type section
- Named for: Chugwater, Wyoming
- Named by: N. H. Darton, 1904

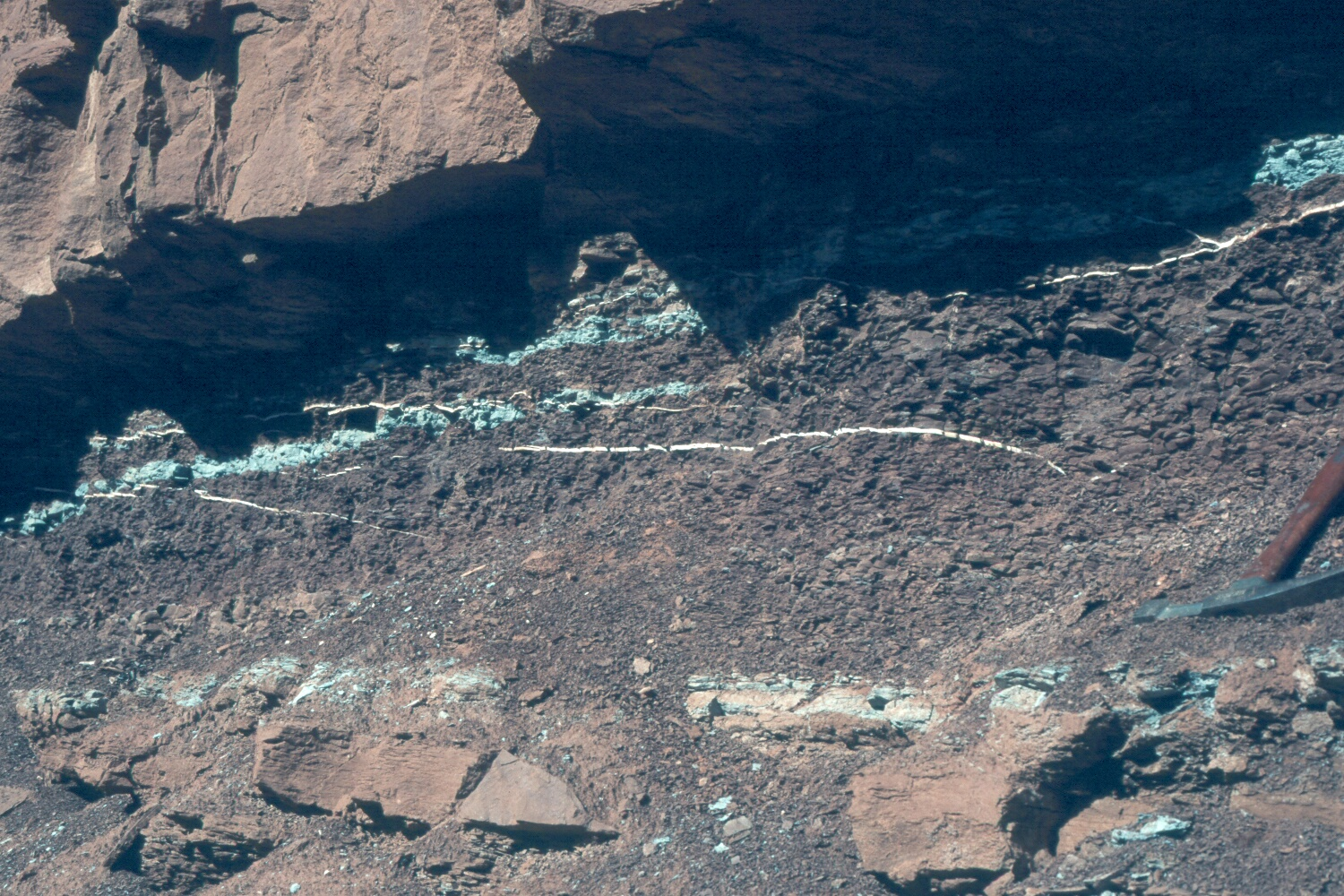
Gypsum veins in the Chugwater, same outcrop as above

The Chugwater Formation is a mapped bedrock unit consisting primarily of red sandstone, in the states of Wyoming, Montana, and Colorado in the United States. It is recognized as a geologic formation in Colorado and Montana, but as a Group (set of formations), the Chugwater Group, in Wyoming. Despite its presence below the highly studied Morrison Formation, the Chugwater receives little attention.

== Description ==
The most noticeable feature on a large scale is the brick-red color, caused by oxidation of iron minerals in the rock. This color is periodically interrupted by streaks and spots of reduced iron, a light bluish-gray shade. Near the top of the formation is a thick layer of gypsum of very high quality. The whole rock is interrupted by gypsum veins as well as having a disrupted texture because of the precipitation of gypsum crystals after deposition of the rock.

The Chugwater consists mainly of siltstone and shales with interspersed sandstones. While this composition will lend itself to breaking easily and not outcropping, the shear size of the formation causes there to be large outcrops. Though most sedimentary structures are not visible due to the gypsum interruption, there are a few examples of ripple marks and occasional crossbedding. Examples of infilled mudcracks of irregular shape, are common.

The main constituent of the Chugwater is quartz, which helps to account for its unusual hardness. Feldspars are also present, though in lesser amounts, as are hematite and gypsum. Small flecks of a dark, opaque mineral have been tentatively identified as biotite. The minerals are cemented by a non-carbonate matrix, probably siliceous.

The Chugwater is a prime example of red beds, commonly deposited during the Permian and Triassic periods.

=== Stratigraphy ===
The Chugwater Group is divided into various formations, depending on the basin in which it occurs. It is mapped in the following basins within the Rocky Mountains: Denver Basin, Wind River Basin, Bighorn Basin, Powder River Basin, Greater Green River Basin, Laramie Basin.

For example, in the Wind River and Greater Green River basins, the formations (in ascending stratigraphic order) are: Red Peak Formation, Crow Mountain Formation, Jelm Formation, and Popo Agie Formation. However, in the Powder River Basin, the formations are: Red Peak Formation, Alcova Limestone, Crow Mountain Sandstone, unnamed red beds, and Popo Agie Formation.

== Age ==
Relative age dating of the Chugwater places it in the Triassic Period.
