= Phosphoria Formation =

Geologic formation in the northwestern United States

- Stratigraphic range: Early Permian
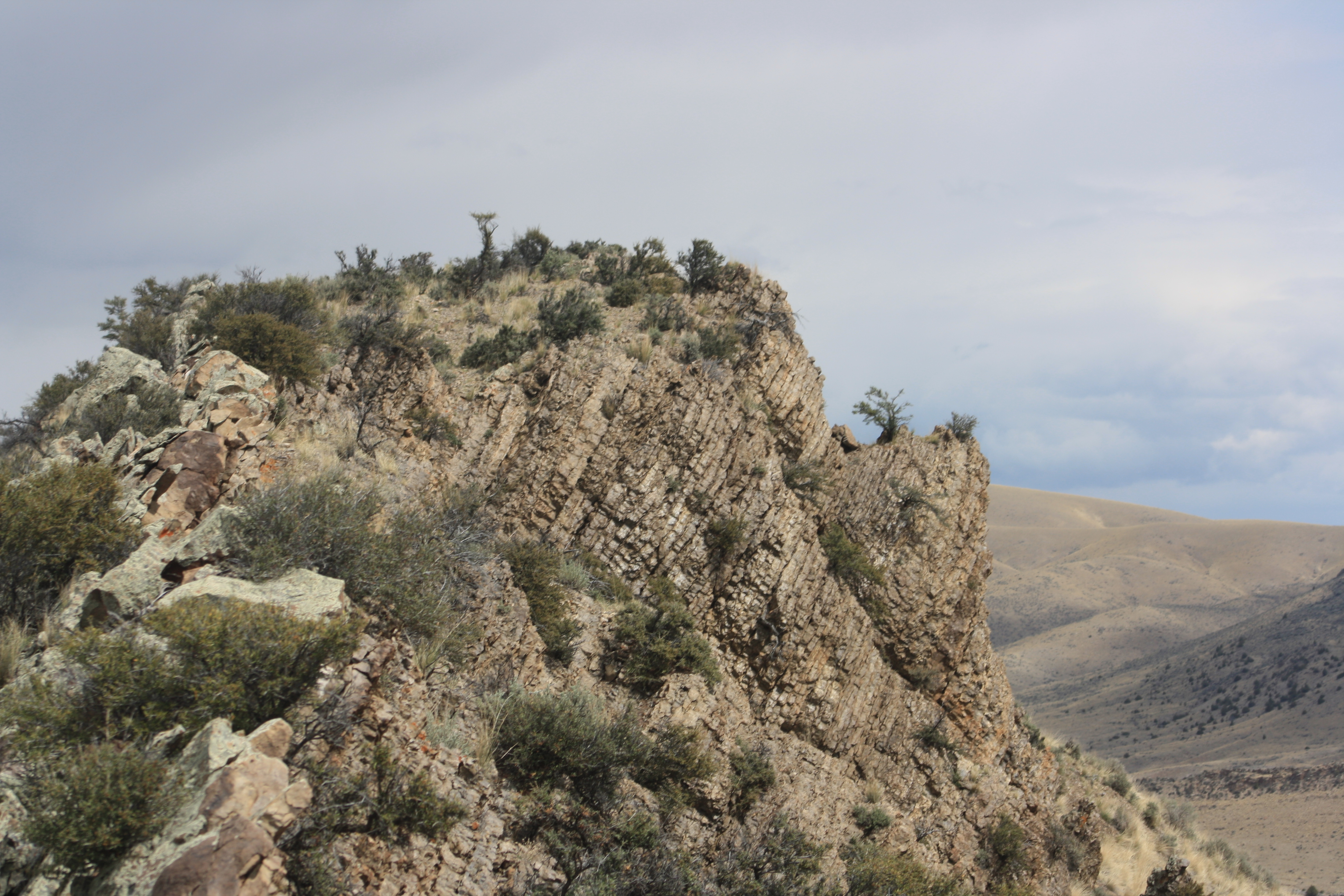
- An outcrop of the Phosphoria Formation near the Big Hole River in western Montana.
- Type: Geological formation
- Underlies: Dinwoody Formation
- Overlies: Casper Formation, Park City Formation, Tensleep Sandstone
- Area: 350,000 sq. km (140,000 sq. mi)
- Thickness: Up to 420 metres (1,380 ft)

Lithology
- Primary: Limestone, dolomite, shale
- Other: Chert, phosphorite, sandstone

Location
- Region: Idaho, Montana, Utah, Wyoming
- Country: United States

Type section
- Named for: Phosphoria Gulch, Idaho
- Named by: Richards and Mansfield, 1912

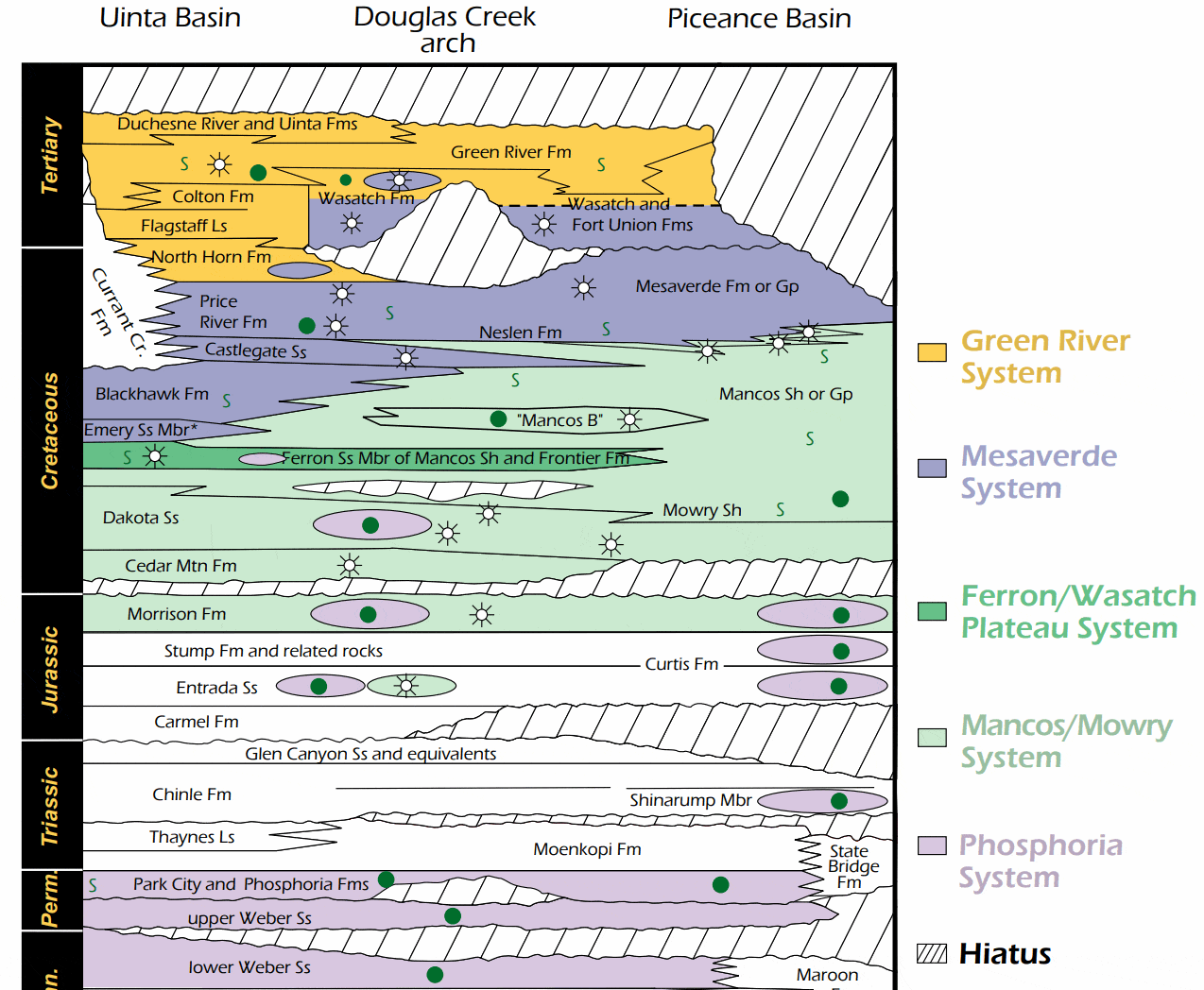
Uinta-Piceance Basin stratigraphic column showing the relationship of the Phosphoria Formation

The Phosphoria Formation of the western United States is a geological formation of Early Permian age. It represents some 15 million years of sedimentation, reaches a thickness of 420 metres (1,380 ft) and covers an area of 350,000 square kilometres (140,000 sq mi).

The Phosphoria includes phosphorite beds that are an important source of phosphorus. Many of its shales are rich in organic matter and are petroleum source rocks, and some of its dolomites include petroleum reservoirs.

== Environment of deposition ==
The Phosphoria Formation was deposited under marine conditions in a foreland basin located between the Paleozoic continental margin and the North American cratonic shelf. The upwelling of cold, nutrient-rich marine water at that time stimulated the growth of plankton and nekton, resulting in the accumulation of organic matter on the sea floor. That, coupled with low rates of clastic and carbonate sedimentation, led to the high phosphate and hydrocarbon content of the formation, as well as elevated levels of cadmium, chromium, copper, fluorine, molybdenum, nickel, rare earth elements, selenium, uranium, vanadium, and zinc.

== Stratigraphy and lithology ==
The formation is commonly subdivided, from the top downward, as follows:

- The Tosi chert member (chert with limestone at base).
- The Retort phosphatic member (phosphorite, dolomite, and siltstone).
- The Rex chert member (gray limestone at base, black chert, and black cherty shale).
- The Meade Peak phosphatic member (interbedded brown to black shale, gray dense limestone, dark brown oolitic phosphorite, and minor white calcareous sandstone).
- The Lower Chert member (dark cherty shale).

The Phosphoria is underlain by the Pennsylvanian-Permian Casper Formation or, depending on the location, by the Park City Formation or the Tensleep Sandstone, and it is overlain by the Triassic Dinwoody Formation. The upper boundary is placed at the top of the uppermost phosphorite bed and below the tan calcareous siltstone of Dinwoody formation. The lower boundary is marked by a thin phosphorite that contains abundant fish scales and bones. The Shedhorn Formation is laterally equivalent to the Meade Peak Member.

== Thickness and distribution ==
The formation reaches its greatest thickness in the Sublett Range in the Paleozoic cordilleran structural basin of southern Idaho. Within the basin the formation consists of a basal phosphorite overlain by a thick sequence of chert and cherty sandstone. To the east in western Wyoming the Phosphoria gradually decreases in thickness and is intertongued with carbonate rocks of the Park City Formation and redbed sandstones of the Chugwater Formation of Permian to Triassic age. The Phosphoria units extend into the Wind River Mountains and pinch out in the Green Mountains to the east.

== Paleontology ==
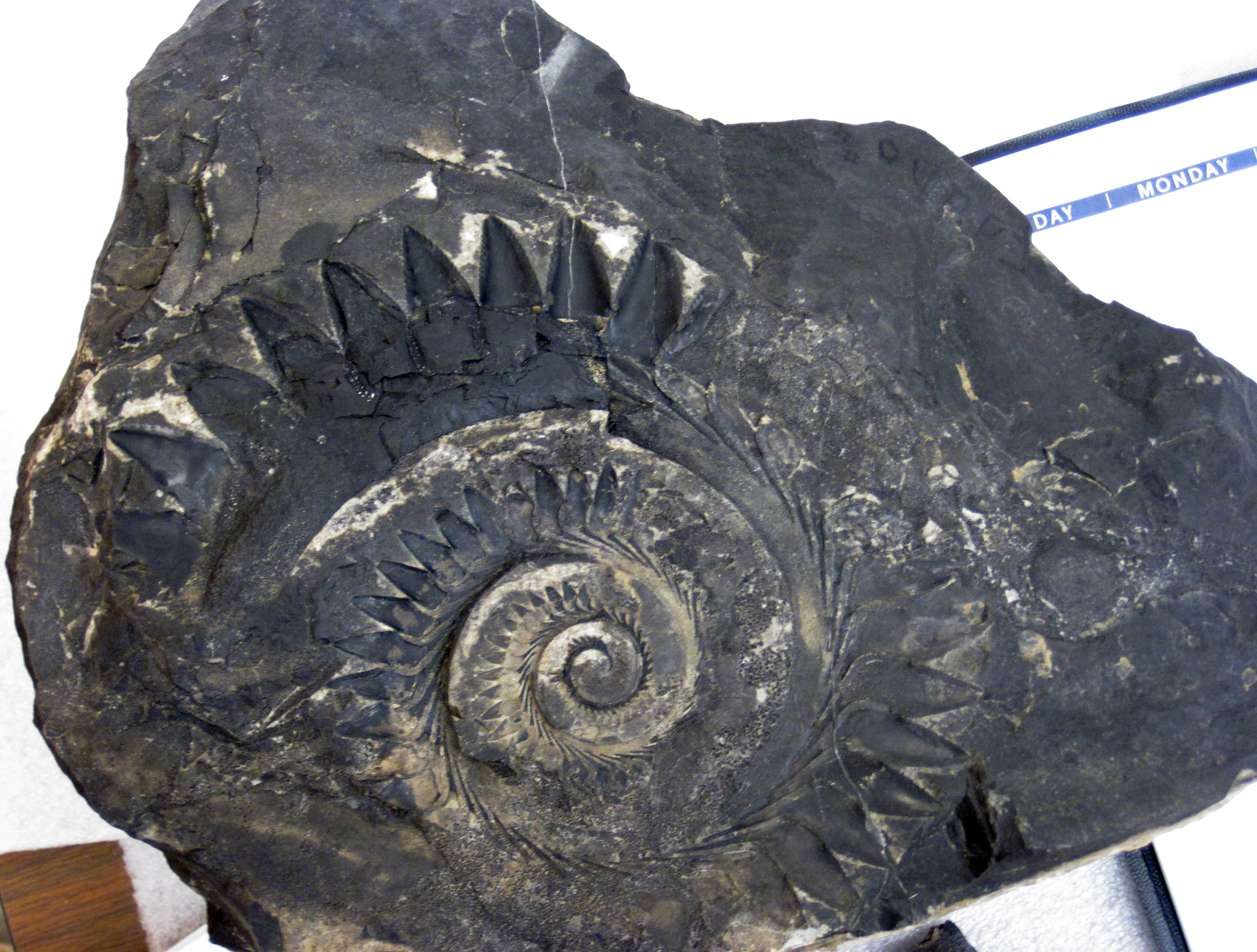
Tooth whorl of Helicoprion from the Phosphoria Formation

Fossils recovered from the Phosphoria Formation include brachiopods, sponge spicules, crinoid stems, conodont elements, and fish scales and bones. Most "tooth whorls" of the enigmatic cartilaginous fish Helicoprion are known from the formation, including the only known specimen with preserved cranial remains. The Early Permian age of the formation is based primarily on conodont biostratigraphy. Fossils from around Lander in Wyoming were described in 1916 by Branson and originally considered to have come from the "Lower Embar Formation", but these fossils are now regarded as coming from the Meade Peak Member.

Fishes of the Phosphoria Formation
Genus	Species	Material	Member	Notes
Actinopterygii indet.	Indeterminate	Teeth	Retort Meade Peak	Indeterminate actinopterygians of various sizes.
Cochliodontiformes indet.	Indeterminate	Teeth	Meade Peak Retort	Large indeterminate cochliodontiforms.
Deltodus	D. sp.	Teeth	Meade Peak Retort	Known from large teeth.
?Fadenia	?F. sp.	Teeth	Retort	Remains possibly from Fadenia.
Glikmanius	G. sp.	Teeth	Retort Meade Peak	A ctenacanth.
Helicoprion	H. davisi	Tooth whorls and cartilage jaws	Meade Peak	A large eugeneodont, well known from the formation.
cf. Helodus	cf. H. sp.	Teeth	Retort	A holocephalian.
?Kaibabvenator	?K. sp.	Teeth tentatively referred to this genus	Meade Peak Retort	A large ctenacanth. Teeth from Meade Peak were originally described by Branson as "Ctenacanthus", before being reinterpreted as possibly from Kaibabvenator.
Janassa	J. sp.	Teeth	Meade Peak	A holocephalian.
Sinohelicoprion	S. sp.	Tooth whorl	Meade Peak	A eugeneodont.
Bobasatraniiformes indet.	Indeterminate	Teeth and scales	Meade Peak	Large bobasatraniid fishes.

== Economic resources ==
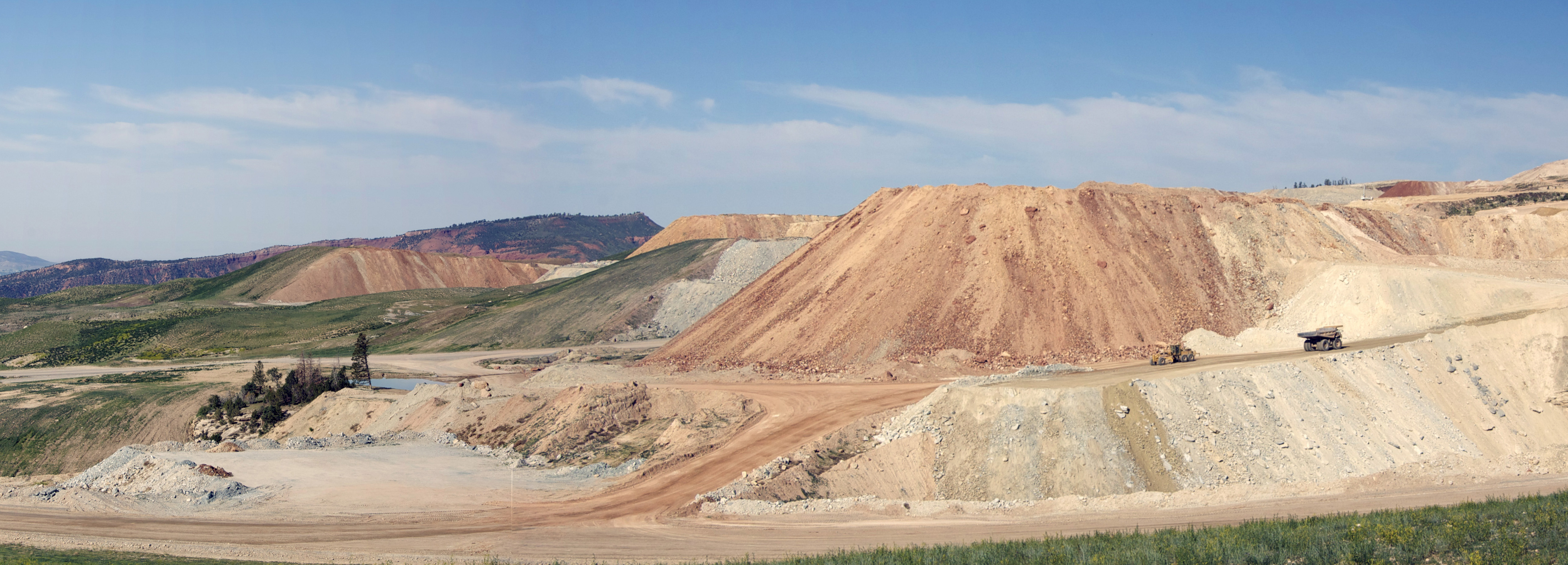
A phosphorite mine near Flaming Gorge, Utah, in 2008.

=== Phosphorus ===
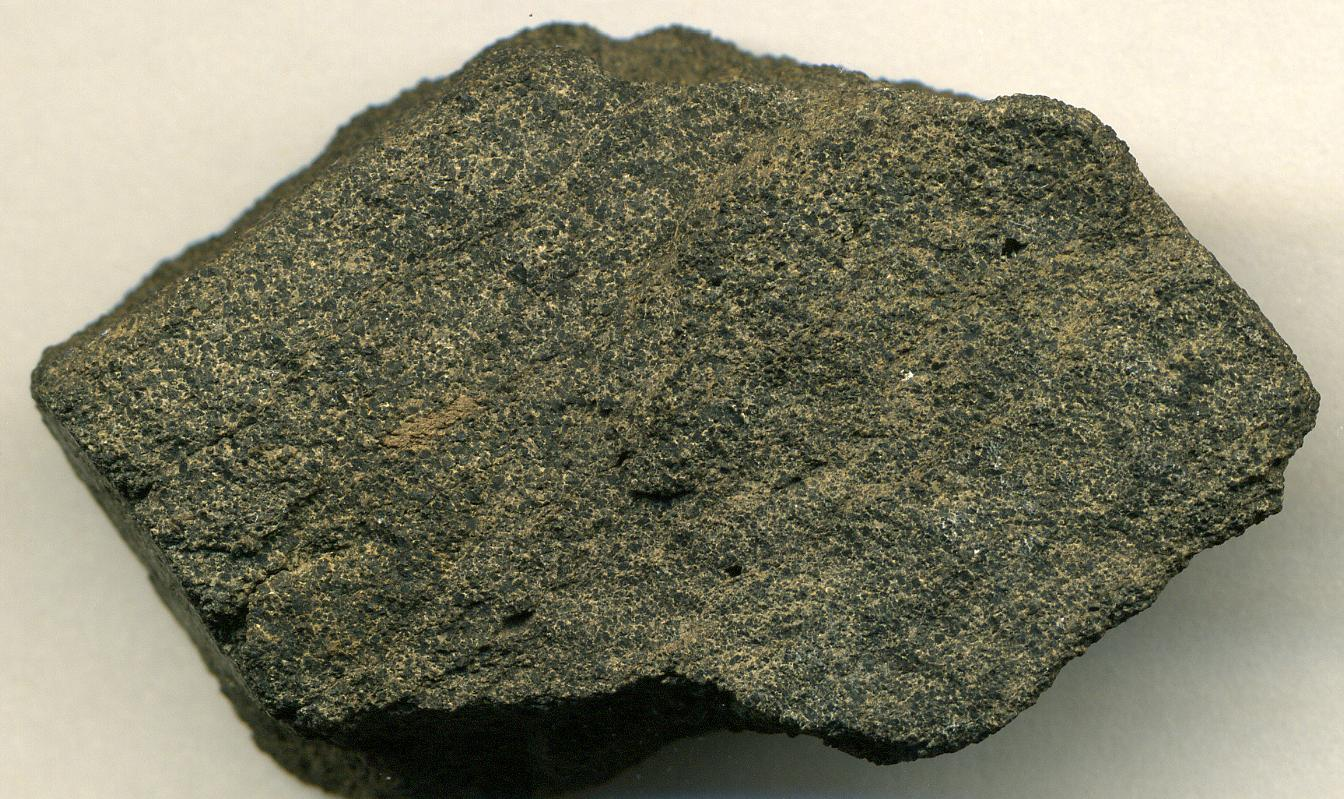
Peloidal phosphorite from the Phosphoria Formation, Simplot Mine, Idaho. 4.6 cm wide.

The Phosphoria phosphorite beds have been mined for phosphorus, which is used primarily for fertilizer production, in southeastern Idaho, northern Utah, western Wyoming, and southwestern Montana.

=== Uranium ===
Low concentrations of uranium are present in the Phosphoria phosphorite beds but are not considered to be of economic interest.

=== Vanadium ===
A vanadium-enriched zone that is present in western Wyoming and southeastern Idaho contains potentially economic concentrations of vanadium in some areas.

=== Petroleum ===
Petroleum has been produced from some of the dolomites in the Phosphoria Formation, and many of the Phosphoria shales are rich in organic matter and are petroleum source rocks.

== See also ==
Phosphate mining in the United States
