= Satanka Formation =

Geologic formation in Wyoming, U.S.

- Stratigraphic range: Permian
- Type: Formation
- Overlies: Casper Formation

Lithology
- Primary: Shale
- Other: Gypsum

Location
- Region: Wyoming
- Country: United States

The Satanka Formation is a geologic formation in Wyoming. It preserves fossils dating back to the Permian period.

== See also ==
- List of fossiliferous stratigraphic units in Wyoming
- Paleontology in Wyoming
