= Twin Creek =

Twin Creek may refer to:

- Twin Creek (Ohio), a tributary of the Great Miami River
- Twin Creek Formation, in Idaho
- Twin Creek Limestone, in Wyoming
