= Tepee Trail Formation =

Geologic formation in Wyoming

- Stratigraphic range: Paleogene
- Type: Formation
- Sub-units: Hendry Ranch Member

Lithology
- Primary: sandstone
- Other: conglomerate, volcaniclastics

Location
- Region: Wyoming
- Country: United States

The Tepee Trail Formation is a geologic formation in Wyoming. It preserves fossils dating back to the Paleogene period.

== See also ==
- List of fossiliferous stratigraphic units in Wyoming
- Paleontology in Wyoming
