= Aspen Shale =

Geologic formation in Wyoming, USA

- Stratigraphic range: Cretaceous
- Type: Formation

Location
- Region: Wyoming
- Country: United States

The Aspen Shale is a geologic formation in southwestern Wyoming, United States. It preserves fossils dating back to the Albian stage of the Cretaceous period, around 100.5–133 million years ago.

== See also ==
- List of fossiliferous stratigraphic units in Wyoming
- Paleontology in Wyoming
