= Hoback Formation =

Geological formation in Wyoming

- Stratigraphic range: Paleogene
- Type: Formation
- Underlies: Pass Peak Conglomerate
- Thickness: 4572 m

Location
- Region: Wyoming
- Country: United States

Type section
- Named for: Hoback River

The Hoback Formation is a geologic formation in west-central Wyoming, located within the Hoback Basin (directly north of the Green River Basin). It formed as a result of increased sedimentation rates from the Laramide Orogeny and preserves fossils dating back to the late Paleogene period, through the early Eocene.

The Hoback Formation was likely formed in a forested floodplain environment during a period of humid climate, as indicated by plentiful coal, carbonaceous shale, and fossilized plant remains. Many of the beds observed are dull in color, indicating that they formed in a reducing environment - another sign of a floodplain depositional environment, as standing water and waterlogged soil would be present for a substantial portion of the year. A prominent sandstone facies (with crossbedding, overbank deposits, and large pebbly deposits), thought to represent a large stream, is also present through much of the formation.

Fossils found within the Hoback Formation include bone fragments, turtles, larger mammals, molluscs, scales, fish teeth, and a wide variety of fossilized plant material (including fossilized wood). Signs of early Cenozoic crocodiles have also been found.

== See also ==
- List of fossiliferous stratigraphic units in Wyoming
- Paleontology in Wyoming
