= Newcastle Sandstone =

- Stratigraphic range: Cretaceous
- Type: Formation

Location
- Region: Wyoming
- Country: United States

The Newcastle Sandstone is a geologic formation in Wyoming, United States. It preserves fossils dating back to the Late Cretaceous period.

Named as a member of Draneros shale of Colorado group for the town of Newcastle, Weston Co, WY in Powder River basin, where member is conspicuously developed.

Consists of reddish to light-yellow sandstone associated with black, carbonaceous shale. About 35 ft thick in vicinity of Newcastle. A Cretaceous sequence can be formed in the northern Great Plains in Williston and Powder River basins, as well as Chadron arch.

This area is classed as a formation on the westrin rim of the black hills.

== See also ==
- List of fossiliferous stratigraphic units in Wyoming
- Paleontology in Wyoming
