= DuNoir Limestone =

Geologic formation in Wyoming, United States

- Stratigraphic range: Cambrian
- Type: Formation

Lithology
- Primary: limestone

Location
- Region: Wyoming
- Country: United States

The DuNoir Limestone is a geologic formation in Wyoming, United States. It preserves fossils dating back to the Cambrian period.

== See also ==
- List of fossiliferous stratigraphic units in Wyoming
- Paleontology in Wyoming
- Dunoir, Wyoming
