= Hanna Formation =

Geologic formation in Wyoming, United States

- Stratigraphic range: Selandian-Thanetian (Torrejonian-Tiffanian); ~63–56 Ma
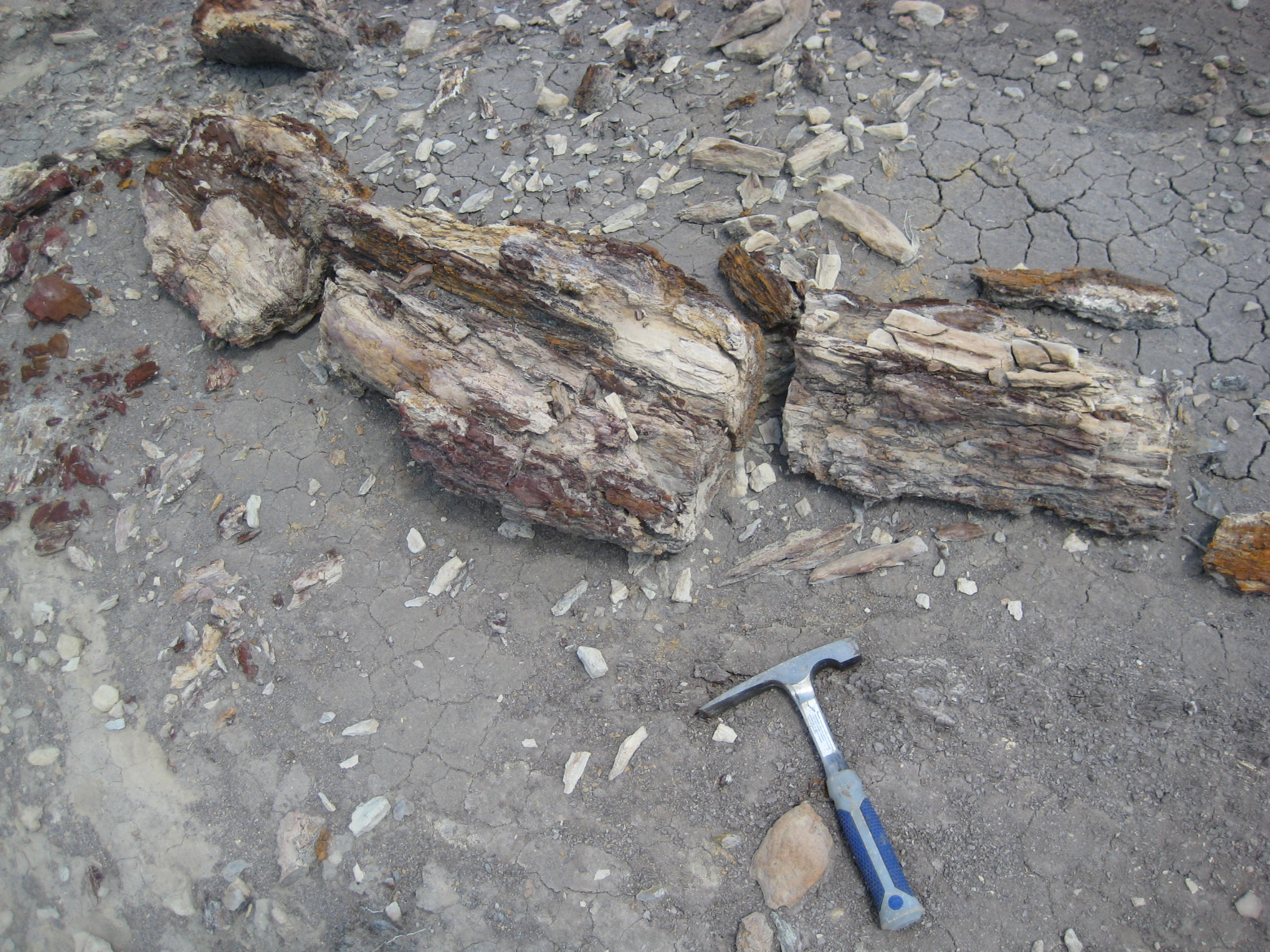
- Petrified wood from the Hanna Formation
- Type: Formation

Location
- Coordinates: 41.8°N 107.0°W
- Approximate paleocoordinates: 47.6°N 86.8°W
- Region: Wyoming
- Country: United States
- Extent: Carbon Basin

Type section
- Named for: High Hanna Hill
- Hanna Formation (the United States) Hanna Formation (Wyoming)

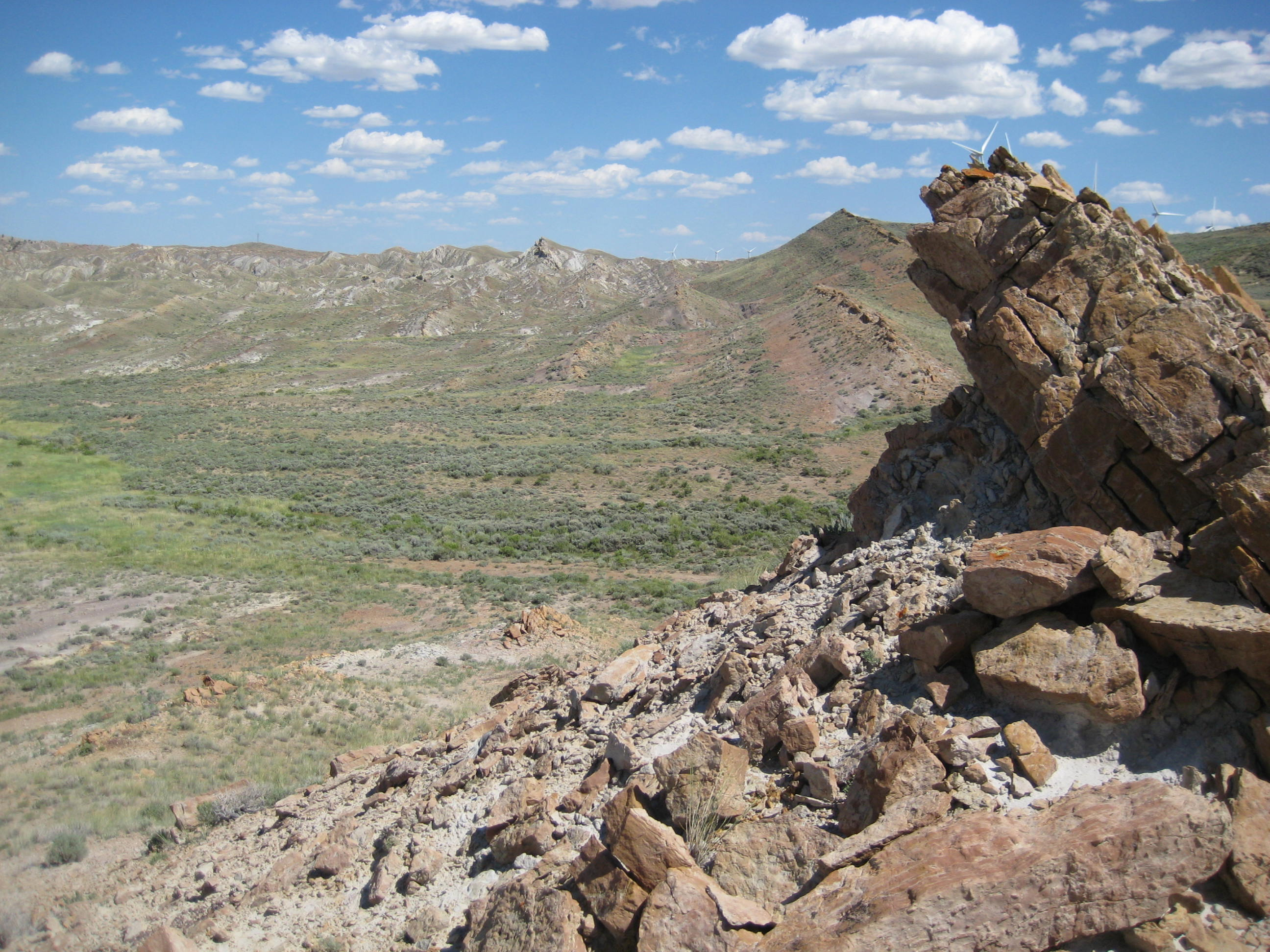
Tilted strata of the Hanna Formation

The Hanna Formation is a geologic formation in Wyoming. It preserves fossils dating back to the Torrejonian to Tiffanian stages of the Paleogene period.

== See also ==
- List of fossiliferous stratigraphic units in Wyoming
- Paleontology in Wyoming
