= Meteetse Formation =

Geologic formation in Wyoming, United States

- Stratigraphic range: Cretaceous
- Type: Formation

Location
- Region: Wyoming
- Country: United States

The Meteetse Formation is a geologic formation in Wyoming. It preserves fossils dating back to the Cretaceous period.

== See also ==
- List of fossiliferous stratigraphic units in Wyoming
- Paleontology in Wyoming
