= Wiggins Formation =

Geologic formation in Wyoming, United States

- Stratigraphic range: Paleogene
- Type: Formation
- Overlies: Pitchfork Formation

Lithology
- Primary: sedimentary rocks
- Other: volcanogenic rocks

Location
- Region: Wyoming
- Country: United States

The Wiggins Formation is a geologic formation in Wyoming. It preserves fossils dating back to the Paleogene period.

== See also ==
- List of fossiliferous stratigraphic units in Wyoming
- Paleontology in Wyoming
