= Dry Creek Shale =

Fossil formation

- Stratigraphic range: Cambrian
- Type: Formation

Lithology
- Primary: shale

Location
- Region: Wyoming
- Country: United States

The Dry Creek Shale is a geologic formation in Wyoming. It preserves fossils dating back to the Cambrian period.

== See also ==
- List of fossiliferous stratigraphic units in Wyoming
- Paleontology in Wyoming
