= Twin Creek Limestone =

- Stratigraphic range: Jurassic
- Type: Formation
- Underlies: Preuss Formation
- Overlies: Nugget Sandstone

Lithology
- Primary: limestone

Location
- Region: Wyoming
- Country: United States

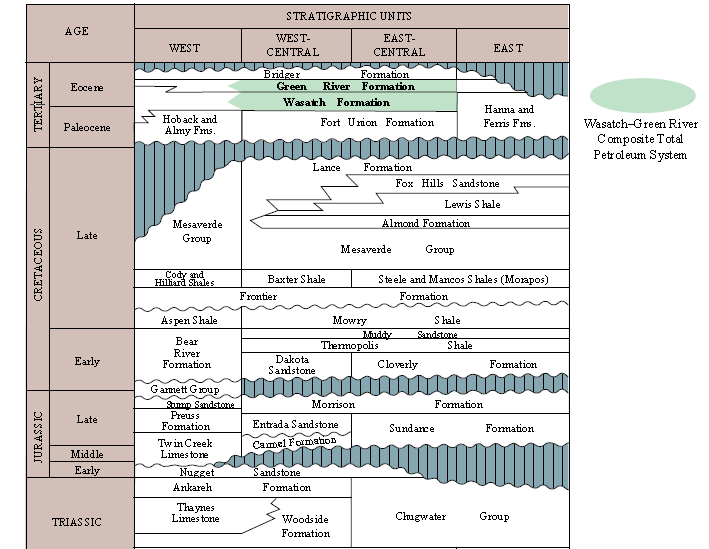
Twin Creek Limestone within Green River Basin stratigraphy

The Twin Creek Limestone is a geologic formation in Wyoming. It preserves fossils dating back to the Jurassic period.

== See also ==
- List of fossiliferous stratigraphic units in Wyoming
- Paleontology in Wyoming
