= Popo Agie Formation =

Geologic formation in the United States

- Stratigraphic range: Late Triassic; Carnian
- Type: Geological formation
- Unit of: Chugwater Group
- Overlies: Gartra Formation

Location
- Region: North America
- Country: United States

The Popo Agie Formation (/poʊˈpoʊʒə/ poh-POH-zhə) is a Triassic geologic formation that crops out in western Wyoming, western Colorado, and Utah. It was deposited during the Late Triassic in fluvial (river) and lacustrine (lake) environments that existed across much of what is now the American southwest. The earliest known dinosaur of the Laurasian continent, Ahvaytum, is discovered from the Popo Agie Formation. Dinosaurian trace fossils and fragmentary fossils of prehistoric reptiles and amphibians, including pseudosuchian reptiles and temnospondyl amphibians, have also been reported from this formation.

== Paleobiota ==
Color key: Taxon / Reclassified taxon / Taxon falsely reported as present / Dubious taxon or junior synonym / Ichnotaxon / Ootaxon / Morphotaxon	Notes; Uncertain or tentative taxa are in small text; ~~crossed out~~ taxa are discredited.

=== Amphibians ===
Taxon	Species	Member	Material	Notes	Images
Apachesaurus	A. sp.		Complete skull	A metoposaurid temnospondyl, originally described as Anaschisma sp. and later Eupelor browni	
Anaschisma	A. browni		Complete skull	A metoposaurid temnospondyl	
Metoposauridae	Indeterminate		Complete skull	Originally described as Anaschisma browni	

=== Reptiles ===
Taxon	Species	Member	Material	Notes	Images
Ahvaytum	A. bahndooiveche		UWGM 1975, a left astragalus, and UWGM 7549, a partial left femur	A probable sauropodomorph dinosaur and the oldest known Laurasian dinosaur	
Heptasuchus	H. clarki		UW 11562, a partial skull and postcranial skeleton; UW 11563 through UW 11565, partial postcranial remains; both from Big Horn Mountains, Wyoming	A rauisuchian	(in background)
Beesiiwo	B. cooowuse		USNM 494329, a left maxilla and left dentary from Hole in the Wall, Wyoming; TxVP 46037.1, UWGM 7027 and UWGM 7028, maxillary fragments from Cottonwood Creek, Wyoming	A rhynchosaur, previously assigned to cf. Hyperodapedon sanjuanensis	(in foreground)
Poposaurus	P. gracilis		UR 358, a partial ilium from Lander, Wyoming; UR 357, a partial skeleton including vertebrae, hips, and limb bones	A bipedal poposauroid first described from the Popo Agie Formation and known from more complete specimens from the Chinle Formation	
Sulcimentisauria indet.	Indeterminate		A partial left humerus and right femur	A 'silesaurid'	

=== Synapsids ===
Taxon	Species	Member	Material	Notes	Images
Eubrachiosaurus	E. browni		FMNH UC 633, a partial left scapula, left humerus, and left pelvis from Lander, Wyoming	A dicynodont	

== See also ==
- List of dinosaur-bearing rock formations
  - List of stratigraphic units with indeterminate dinosaur fossils
