= Dunoir, Wyoming =

Town in Fremont County, Wyomingy, United States

- Town
- Location of Dunoir in Fremont County, Wyoming
- Coordinates: 43°33′57″N 109°48′47″W
- Country: United States
- State: Wyoming
- County: Fremont

Area
  - Total: 0.0236 sq mi (0.0611 km^{2})
- Elevation: 8,369 ft (2,551 m)
- Time zone: UTC-7 (Mountain (MST))
  - Summer (DST): UTC-6 (MDT)
- ZIP code: 82513
- Area code: 307
- GNIS feature ID: 1599386

Dunoir, Wyoming, also spelled DuNoir, Wyoming, is an unincorporated community in Fremont County of western Wyoming in the United States. Dunoir is at an elevation of 8,369 feet (2,551 m) near Warm Spring Mountain. The main road in town is Union Pass road, #263 and Warm Spring Mountain road #532. Warm Spring Creek runs through the town. Warm Spring Mountain has a summit of 9,524 feet (2,903 m) and is 1.54 miles (2.48 km) southeast of the town at 43.5571°N 109.79115°W in the Shoshone National Forest in the Rocky Mountains. Dunoir is in the Wind River Range. The closest town is Dubois, Wyoming, 15 miles (24 km) southeast of Dunoir.

== Dunoir Special Management Unit ==
Dunoir Special Management Unit (SMU) is in the Shoshone National Forest and is a protected wildland with 28,000 acre. Dunoir Special Management Unit is in the upper Wind River Valley, northwest of Dubois. Motorized wheeled and tract vehicular recreation are not allowed in the Dunoir Special Management Unit. Dunoir Special Management Unit was founded on October 9, 1972, by Public Law 92-476. Dunoir Special Management Unit is in the Washakie Wilderness.

== See also ==
- DuNoir Glacier
- DuNoir Limestone
