= Red Peak Formation =

Geologic formation in Wyoming, United States

- Stratigraphic range: Triassic
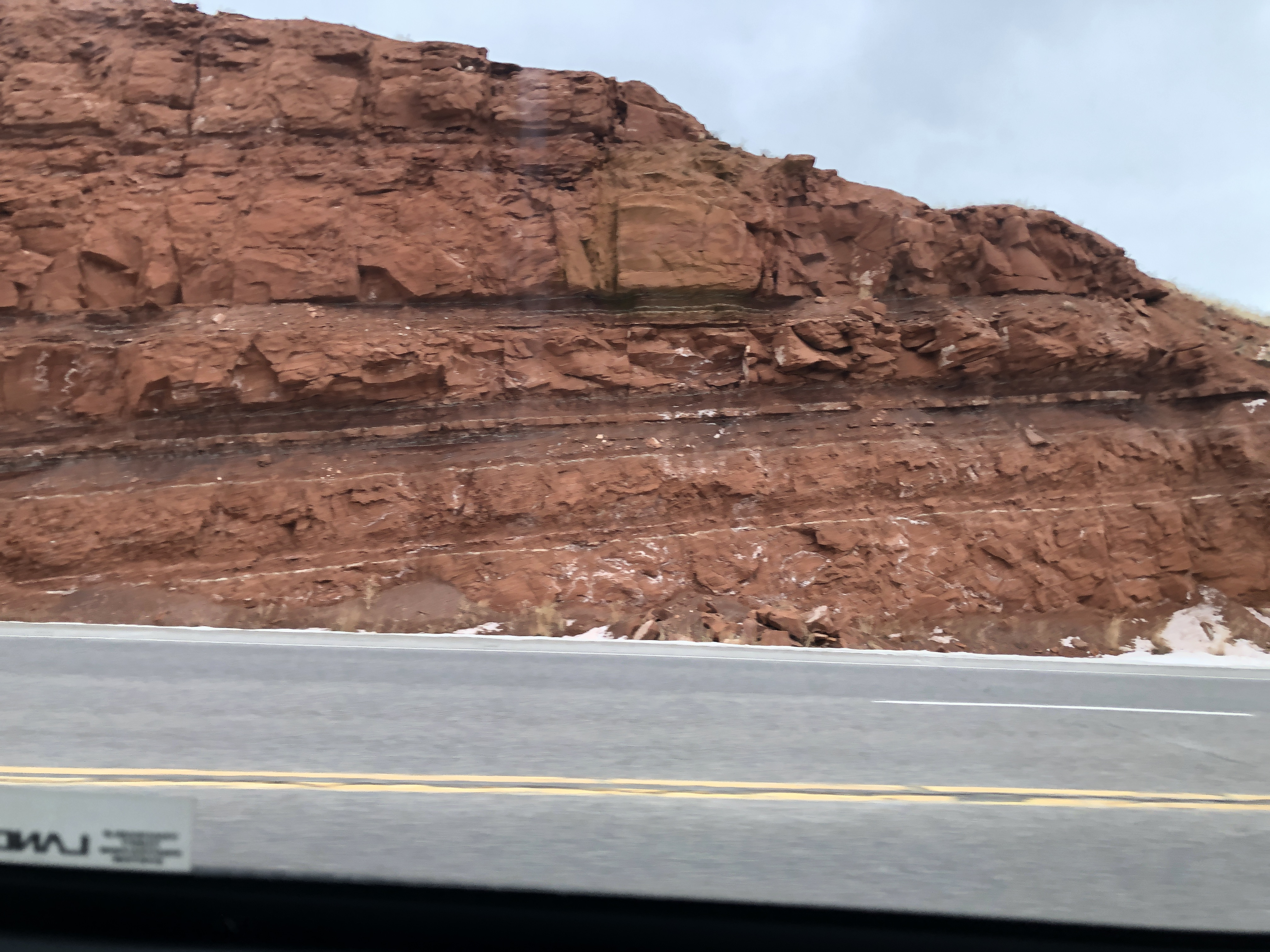
- Type: Formation

Location
- Region: Wyoming
- Country: United States

The Red Peak Formation is a geologic formation in Wyoming belonging to the Chugwater Group. It preserves fossils dating back to the Triassic period.

It is composed of siltstone, claystone, and very fine grained sandstone that is reddish orange; some grayish red, reddish purple, and minor amounts of light greenish gray also occur. Strata are thinly laminated to thin bedded, commonly ripple laminated; upper part forms cliffs and ledges, lower part poorly exposed. The Red Peak is 168–177 m (550–580 feet) thick.

== See also ==
- List of fossiliferous stratigraphic units in Wyoming
- Paleontology in Wyoming
