= Ayres Natural Bridge Park =

Natural park in Wyoming, United States

Coordinates: 42.734134°N 105.612216°W

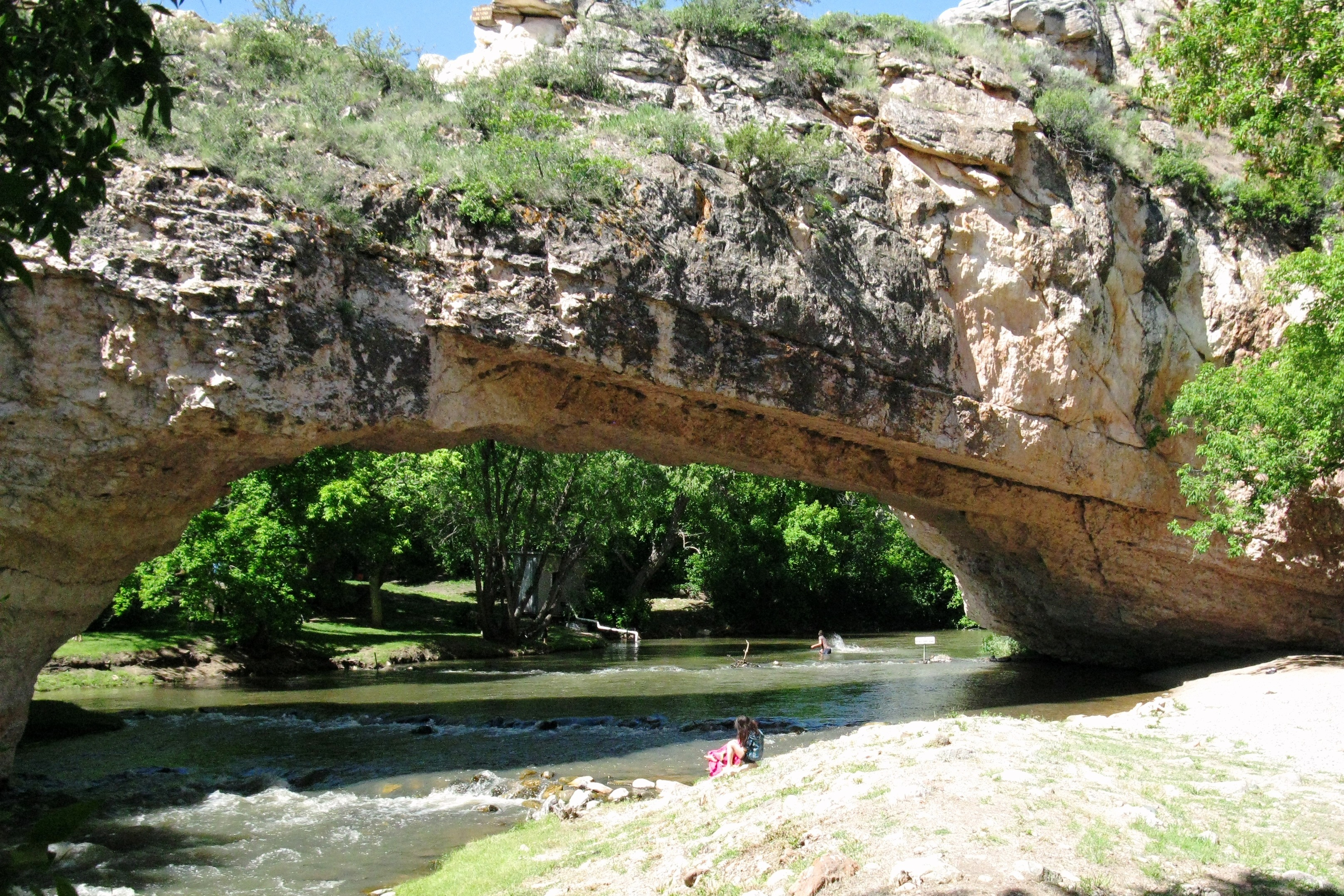
Ayres Natural Bridge over LaPrele Creek

Ayres Natural Bridge Park is a county park in Converse County, Wyoming in the United States. It occupies 150 acres (0.6 km²) between the towns Glenrock and Douglas about 6 kilometers south of Interstate 25 exit 151. The park's name is derived from the rock formation of the same name. Ayres is the surname of the family who donated the land which had been part of their ranch.

Over the course of millions of years, a bend in LaPrele Creek (originally known as Bridge Creek) wore away at a wall of solid rock, creating a natural opening. The creek eventually shifted course through the opening, forming a 30-foot (10 m) high and 50-foot (15 m) wide arch, today known as Ayres Natural Bridge, from sandstones of the Casper Formation.

Located about a mile (2 km) south of the Oregon Trail, the Natural Bridge was often visited by emigrants traveling west. It is considered one of Wyoming's first tourist attractions. In 1843, a pioneer described it as "a natural bridge of solid rock, over a rapid torrent, the arch being regular as tho' shaped by art."

The park is free to visit. There is a small campground in the park, as well as open picnic areas and covered tables. It is opened from April 15 through October 15, from 8 a.m. to 8 p.m., with registered campers allowed to stay overnight. No pets are allowed in the park.

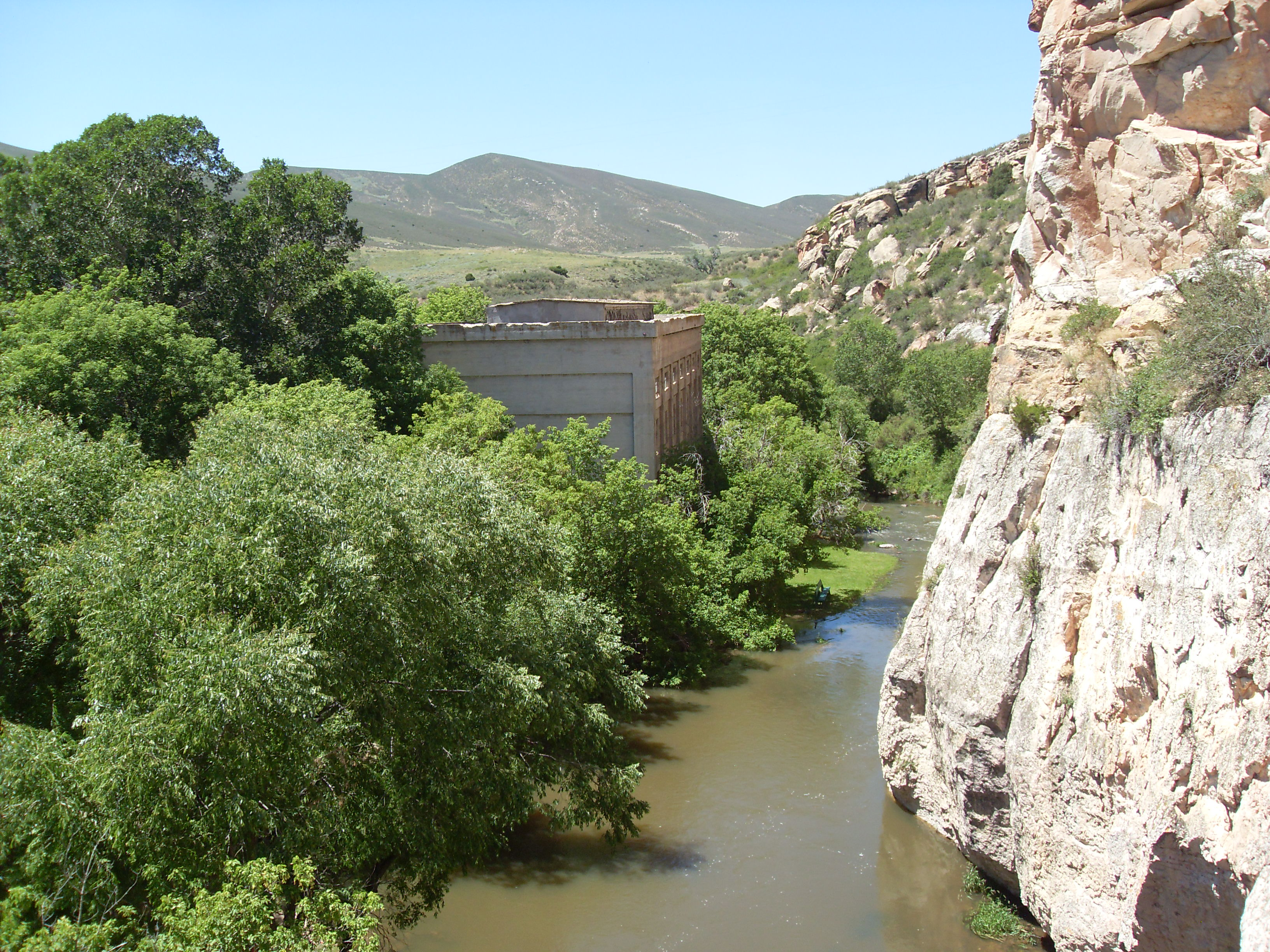
View from the natural bridge to the LaPrele Creek and the old power house

At the park entrance, the old power house, a gray concrete building from the early 1900s build by North Platte Irrigation Company to supply power to pump water from North Platte River for irrigation is still preserved. The company went bankrupt before the project was completed.
