= Phosphorite =

Sedimentary rock containing large amounts of phosphate minerals

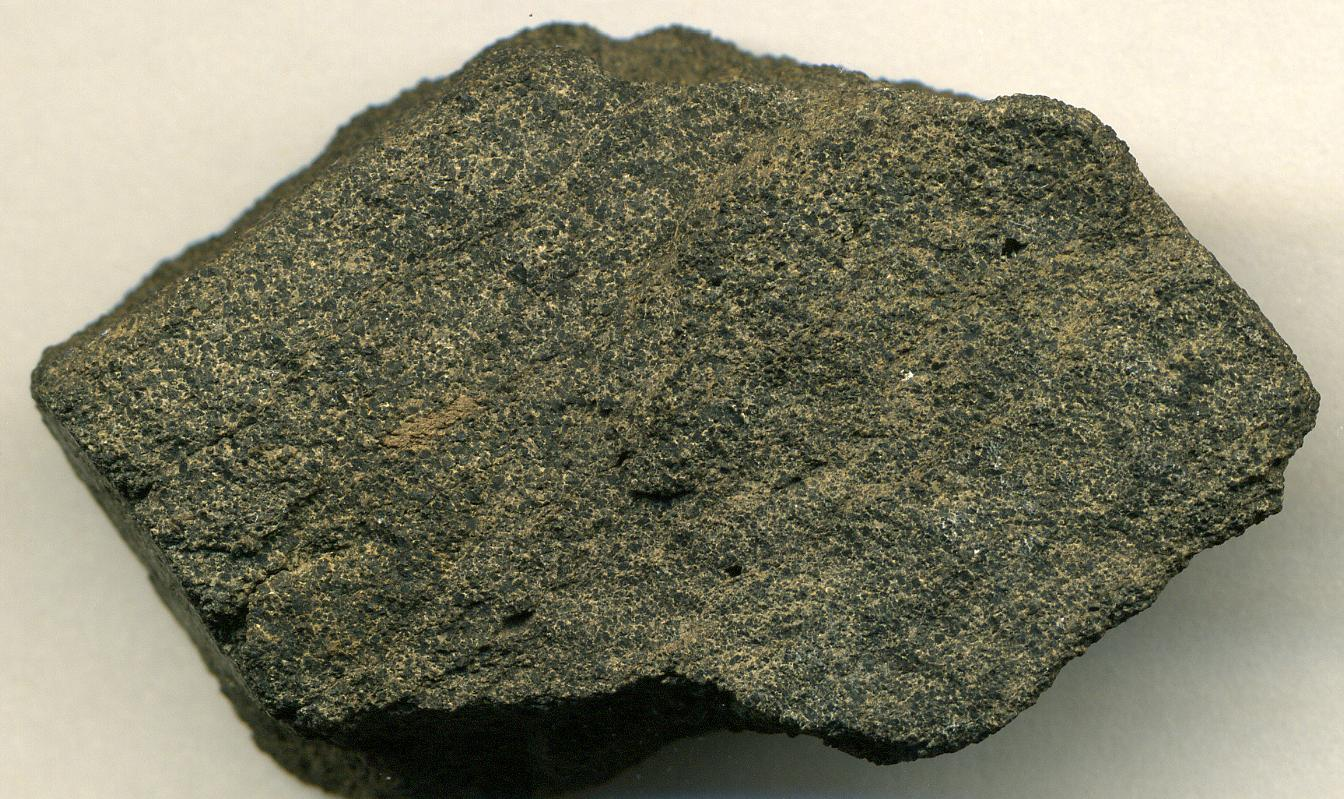
Peloidal phosphorite, Phosphoria Formation, Simplot Mine, Idaho. 4.6 cm wide.

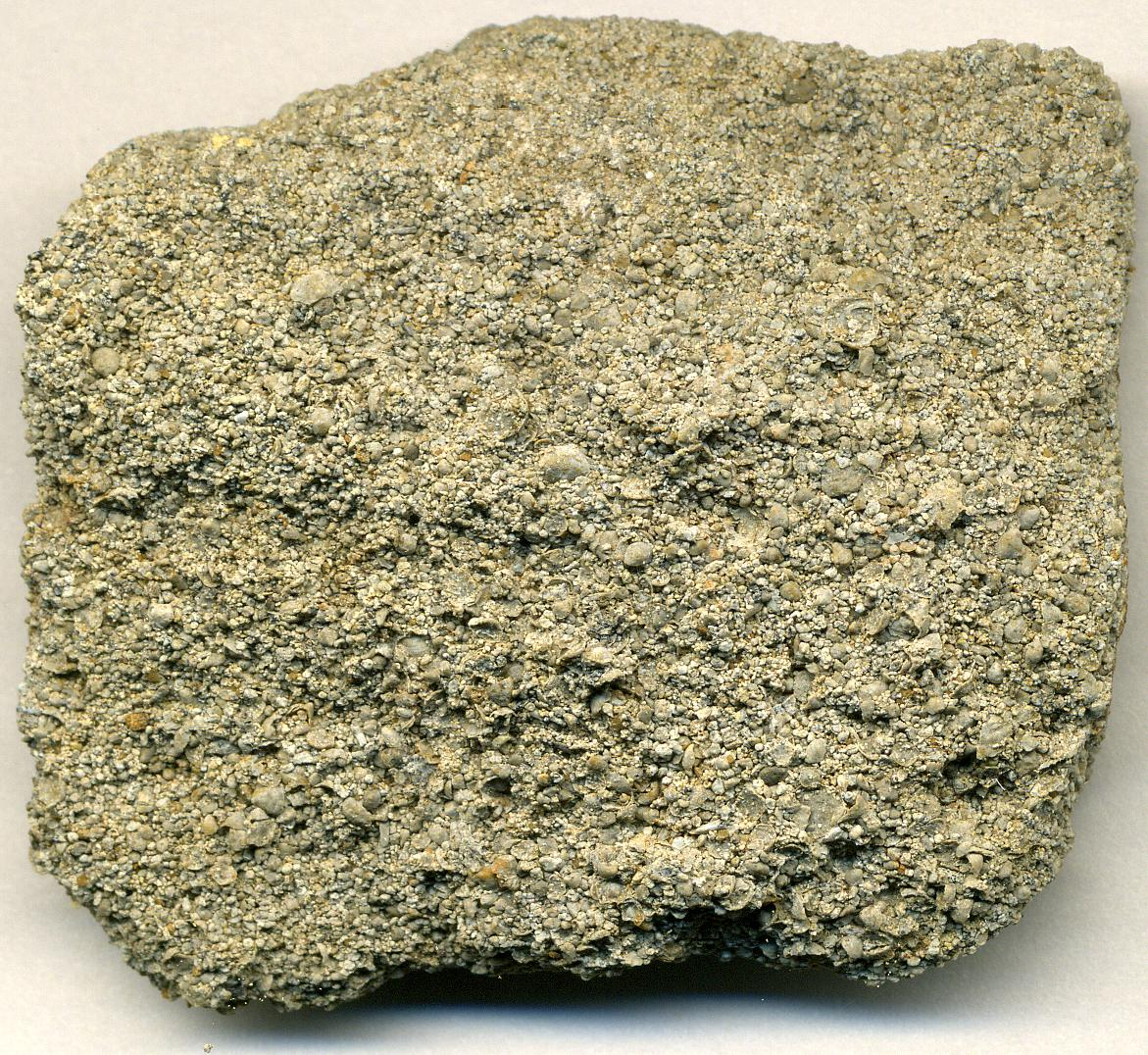
Fossiliferous peloidal phosphorite, (4.7 cm across), Yunnan, China.

Phosphorite, phosphate rock or rock phosphate is a non-detrital sedimentary rock that contains high amounts of phosphate minerals. The phosphate content of phosphorite (or grade of phosphate rock) varies greatly, from 4% to 20% phosphorus pentoxide (P_{2}O_{5}). Marketed phosphate rock is enriched ("beneficiated") to at least 28%, often more than 30% P_{2}O_{5}. This occurs through washing, screening, deliming, magnetic separation or flotation. By comparison, the average phosphorus content of sedimentary rocks is less than 0.2%.

The phosphate is present as fluorapatite Ca_{5}(PO_{4})_{3}F typically in cryptocrystalline masses (grain sizes < 1 μm) referred to as collophane-sedimentary apatite deposits of uncertain origin. It is also present as hydroxyapatite Ca_{5}(PO_{4})_{3}OH or Ca_{10}(PO_{4})_{6}(OH)_{2}, which is often dissolved from vertebrate bones and teeth. In contrast, fluorapatite can originate from hydrothermal veins. Other sources also include chemically dissolved phosphate minerals from igneous and metamorphic rocks. Phosphorite deposits often occur in extensive layers, which cumulatively cover tens of thousands of square kilometres of the Earth's crust.

Limestones and mudstones are common phosphate-bearing rocks. Phosphate-rich sedimentary rocks can occur in dark brown to black beds, ranging from centimeter-sized laminae to beds that are several meters thick. Although these thick beds can exist, they are rarely composed only of phosphatic sedimentary rocks. Phosphatic sedimentary rocks are commonly accompanied by or interbedded with shales, cherts, limestone, dolomites and sometimes sandstone. These layers contain the same textures and structures as fine-grained limestones. They may represent diagenetic replacements of carbonate minerals by phosphates. They also can be composed of peloids, ooids, fossils, and clasts that are made up of apatite. Some phosphorites are very small and have no distinctive granular textures. This means that their textures are similar to that of collophane, or fine micrite-like texture. Phosphatic grains may be accompanied by organic matter, clay minerals, silt-sized detrital grains, and pyrite. Peloidal or pelletal phosphorites occur normally, whereas oolitic phosphorites are not common.

Phosphorites are known from Proterozoic banded iron formations in Australia, but are more common from Paleozoic and Cenozoic sediments. The Permian Phosphoria Formation of the western United States represents some 15 million years of sedimentation. It reaches a thickness of 420 metres and covers an area of 350,000 km^{2}. Commercially mined phosphorites occur in France, Belgium, Spain, Morocco, Tunisia, Saudi Arabia and Algeria. In the United States phosphorites have been mined in Florida, Tennessee, Wyoming, Utah, Idaho and Kansas.

== Classification of phosphatic sedimentary rocks ==
(1) Pristine: Phosphates that are in pristine conditions have not undergone bioturbation. In other words, the word pristine is used when phosphatic sediment, phosphatized stromatolites and phosphate hardgrounds have not been disturbed.

(2) Condensed: Phosphatic particles, laminae and beds are considered condensed when they have been concentrated. The extraction and reworking processes of phosphatic particles, as well as bioturbation, help this process.

(3) Allochthonous: Phosphatic particles that were moved by turbulent or gravity-driven flows and deposited by these flows.

== Phosphorus cycle, formation and accumulation ==
The heaviest accumulation of phosphorus is mainly on the ocean floor. Phosphorus accumulation occurs from atmospheric precipitation, dust, glacial runoff, cosmic activity, underground hydrothermal volcanic activity, and deposition of organic material. The primary source of dissolved phosphorus is from continental weathering, which is carried by rivers to the ocean. It is then processed by both micro- and macro-organisms. Diatomaceous plankton, phytoplankton, and zooplankton process and dissolve phosphorus in the water. The bones and teeth of certain fish (e.g. anchovies) absorb phosphorus and are later deposited and buried in the marine sediment.

Depending on the pH and salinity levels of the ocean water, organic matter will decay, releasing phosphorus from sediment in shallow basins. Bacteria and enzymes dissolve organic matter on the water–bottom interface, thus returning phosphorus to the beginning of its biogenic cycle. Mineralization of organic matter can also cause the release of phosphorus back into the ocean water.

== Depositional environments ==
Phosphates are known to be deposited in a wide range of depositional environments. Commonly, phosphates are deposited in very shallow, near-shore marine or low-energy environments. This includes environments such as supratidal zones, littoral or intertidal zones, and most importantly, estuarine. Currently, areas of oceanic upwelling cause the formation of phosphates. This is due to the constant influx of phosphate from the large, deep ocean reservoir (see below). This cycle allows the continuous growth of organisms.

Supratidal zones: Supratidal environments are part of the tidal flat system where the presence of vigorous wave activity is non-existent. Tidal flat systems are formed along open coasts and in relatively low-wave-energy environments. They can also develop on high-energy coasts behind barrier islands, where they are sheltered from the high-energy wave action. Within the tidal flat system, the supratidal zone lies at a very high tide level. However, it can be flooded by extreme tides and cut across by tidal channels. This is also subaerially exposed, but is flooded twice a month by spring tides.

Littoral environments/intertidal zones: Intertidal zones are also part of the tidal flat system. The intertidal zone is located within the mean high and low tide levels. It is subject to tidal shifts, meaning it is subaerially exposed once or twice a day. It is not exposed long enough to support the growth of most vegetation. The zone contains both suspension sedimentation and bed load.

Estuarine environments: Estuarine environments, or estuaries, are located at the lower parts of rivers that flow into the open sea. Since they are in the seaward section of the drowned valley system, they receive sediment from both marine and fluvial sources. These contain facies that are affected by tide and wave fluvial processes. An estuary is considered to stretch from the landward limit of tidal facies to the seaward limit of coastal facies. Phosphorites are often deposited in fjords within estuarine environments. These are estuaries with shallow sill constrictions. During the Holocene, sea-level rise led to the formation of fjord estuaries through the drowning of glacially eroded U-shaped valleys.

The most common occurrence of phosphorites is related to strong marine upwelling of sediments. Upwelling is caused by deep water currents that are brought to the surface near the coast, where a large deposition of phosphorites may occur. This type of environment is the main reason why phosphorites are commonly associated with silica and chert. Estuaries are also known as a phosphorus “trap”. This is because coastal estuaries contain a high productivity of phosphorus from marsh grass and benthic algae, which allows an equilibrium exchange between living and dead organisms.

=== Types of phosphorite deposition ===
- Phosphate nodules: These are spherical concentrations that are randomly distributed along the floor of continental shelves. Most phosphorite grains are sand size, although particles greater than 2 mm may be present. These larger grains, referred to as nodules, can range up to several tens of centimeters in size. Phosphate nodules are known to occur in significant quantities offshore northern Chile.

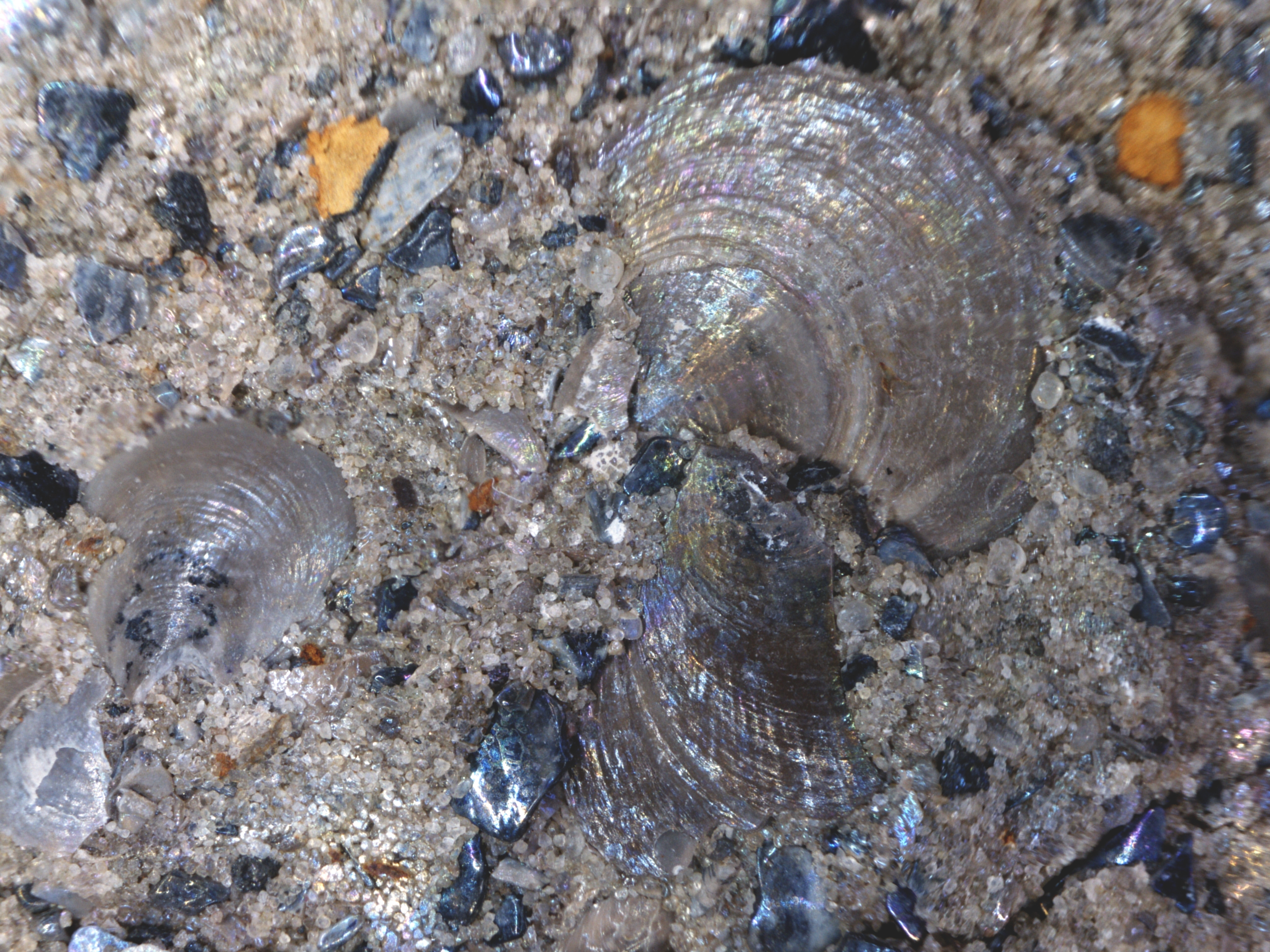
Shelly phosphorite from Estonia

- Bioclastic phosphates or bone beds: Bone beds are bedded phosphate deposits that contain concentrations of small skeletal particles and coprolites. Some also contain invertebrate fossils like brachiopods and become more enriched in P_{2}O_{5} after diagenetic processes have occurred. Phosphate minerals can also cement bioclastic phosphates.
- Phosphatization: Phosphatization is a type of rare diagenetic process. It occurs when fluids that are rich in phosphate are leached from guano. These are then concentrated and reprecipitated in limestone. Phosphatized fossils or fragments of original phosphatic shells are important components within some of these deposits.

==== Tectonic and oceanographic settings of marine phosphorites ====
- Epeiric sea phosphorites: Epeiric sea phosphorites are within marine shelf environments. These are in a broad and shallow cratonic setting. This is where granular phosphorites, phosphorite hardgrounds, and nodules occur.
- Continental margin phosphorites: Convergent, passive, upwelling, non-upwelling. This environment accumulates phosphorites in the form of hardgrounds, nodules and granular beds. These accumulate by carbonate fluorapatite precipitation during early diagenesis in the upper few tens of centimeters of sediment. There are two different environmental conditions in which phosphorites are produced within continental margins. Continental margins can consist of organic-rich sedimentation, strong coastal upwelling, and pronounced low-oxygen zones. They can also form in conditions such as oxygen-rich bottom waters and organic-poor sediments.
- Seamount phosphorites: These are phosphorites that occur in seamounts, guyots, or flat-topped seamounts, seamount ridges. These phosphorites are produced in association with iron and magnesium-bearing crusts. In this setting, the productivity of phosphorus is recycled within an iron oxidation-reduction phosphorus cycle. This cycle can also form glauconite, which is usually associated with modern and ancient phosphorites.
- Insular phosphorites: Insular phosphorites are located in carbonate islands, plateaus, coral islands consisting of a reef surrounding a lagoon or an atoll lagoon, and marine lakes. The phosphorite here originates from guano. Replacement of deep-sea sediments precipitates that has been formed in place on the ocean floor.

== Production and use ==
Phosphate rock production

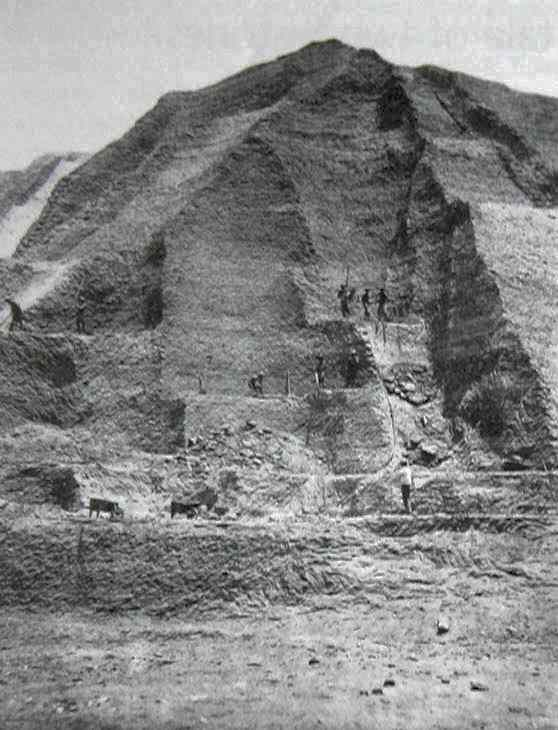
Guano phosphorite mining in the Chincha Islands of Peru, c. 1860

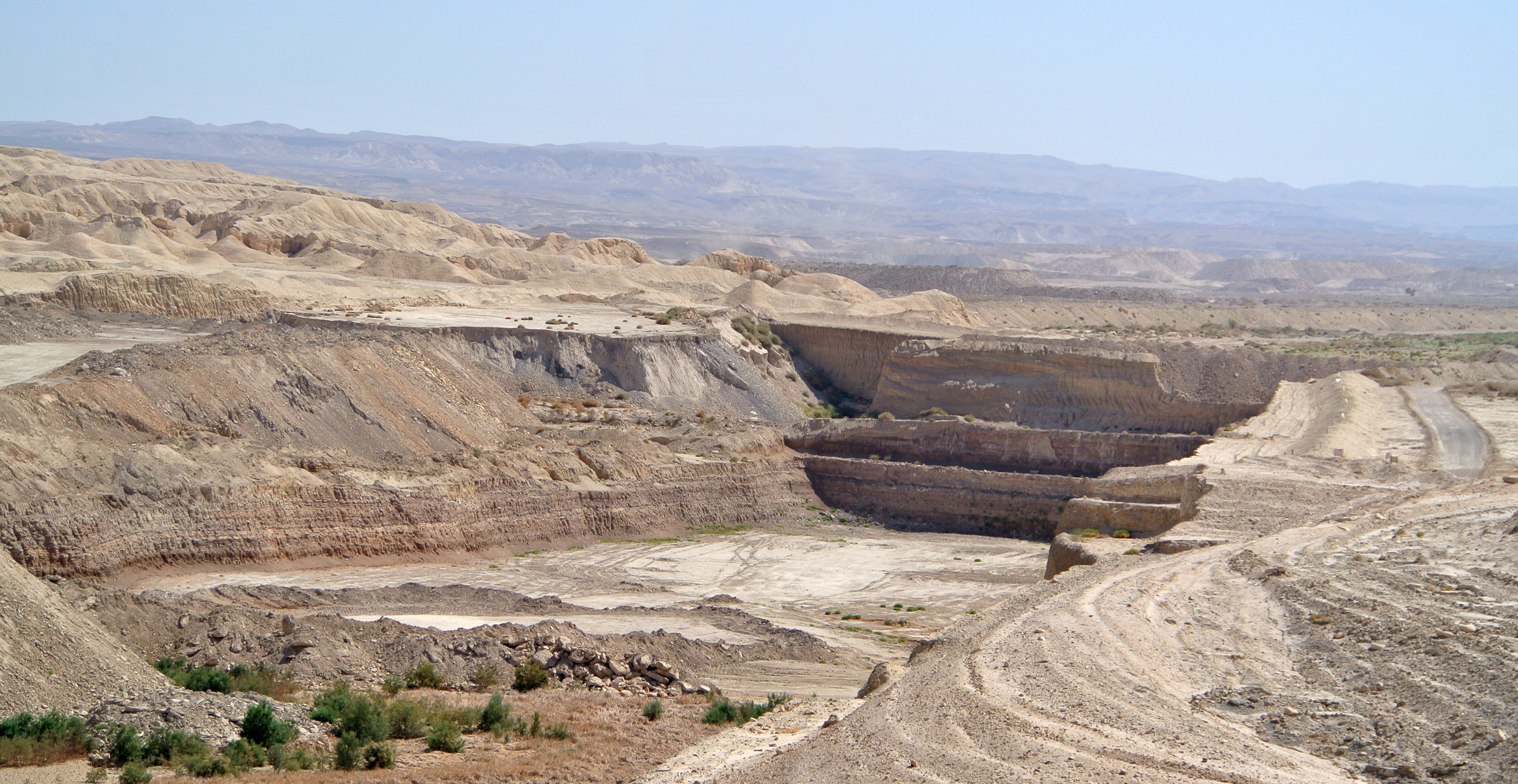
Phosphorite mine near Oron, Negev, Israel.

=== Production ===
Deposits which contain phosphate in quantity and concentration which are economic to mine as ore for their phosphate content are not particularly common. The two primary sources for phosphate are guano, formed from bird or bat droppings, and rocks containing concentrations of the calcium phosphate mineral, apatite.

As of 2006, the US is the world's leading producer and exporter of phosphate fertilizers, accounting for about 37% of world P_{2}O_{5} exports. As of December 2018, the world's total economic demonstrated resource of rock phosphate is 70 gigatonnes, which occurs principally as sedimentary marine phosphorites.

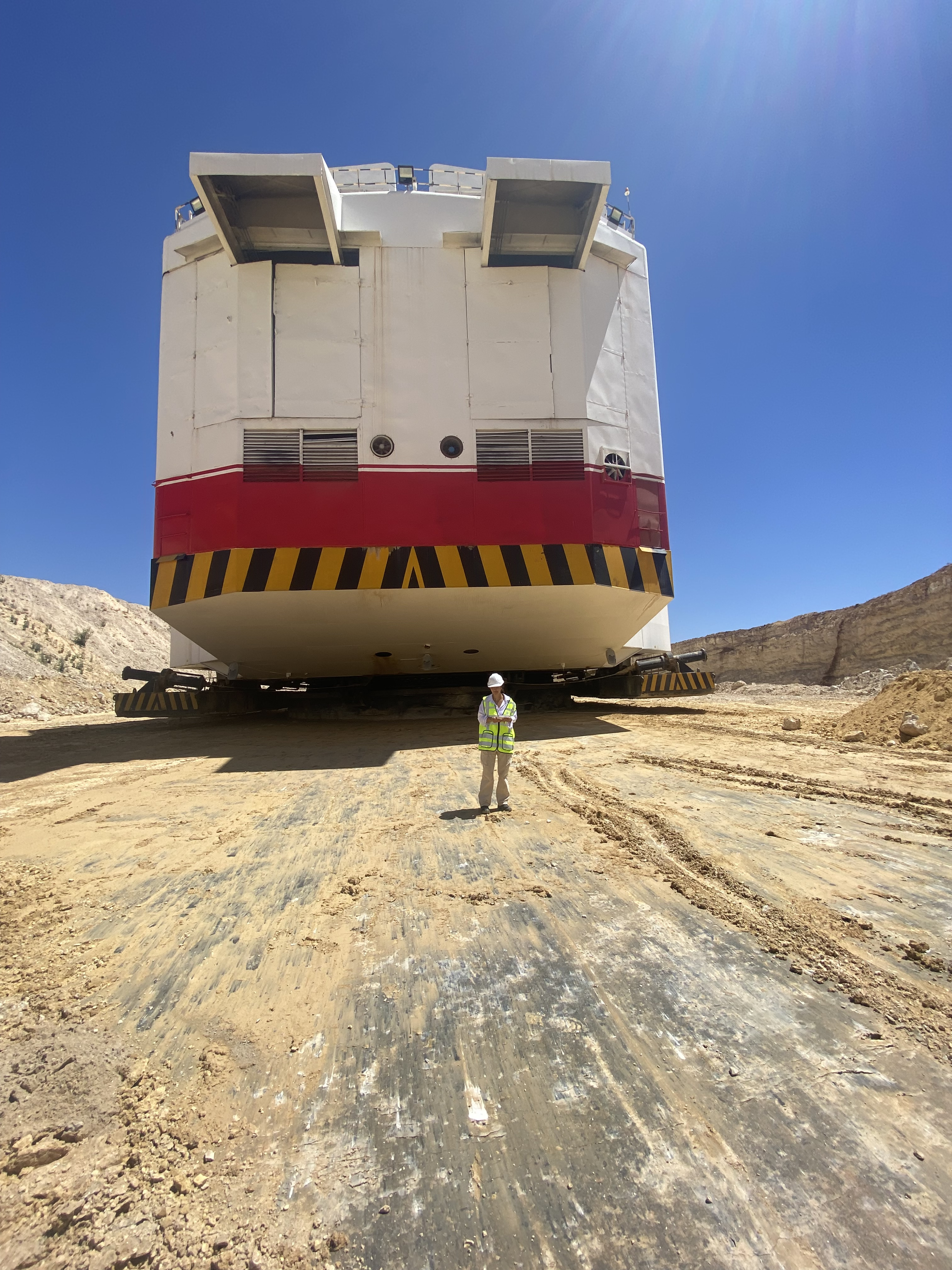
Phosphorite mining in Morocco

As of 2012, China, the United States and Morocco are the world's largest miners of phosphate rock, with a production of 77 megatonnes, 29.4 Mt and 26.8 Mt (including 2.5 Mt in the Sahara of Morocco) respectively in 2012 while global production reached 195 Mt. It is thought that in India there are almost 260 million tons of rock phosphate. Other countries with significant production include Brazil, Russia, Jordan and Tunisia. Historically, large amounts of phosphates were obtained from deposits on small islands such as Christmas Island and Nauru, but these sources are now largely depleted.

Phosphate ore is mined and beneficiated into rock phosphate. Beneficiation of phosphate ore is a process which includes washing, flotation and calcining. Froth flotation is used to concentrate the mined ore to rock phosphate. The mined ore is crushed and washed, creating a slurry. This ore slurry is then treated with fatty acids to cause calcium phosphate to become hydrophobic.

This rock phosphate is then either solubilized to produce wet-process phosphoric acid, or smelted to produce elemental phosphorus. Phosphoric acid is reacted with phosphate rock to make the fertilizer triple superphosphate or with anhydrous ammonia to produce the ammonium phosphate fertilizers. Elemental phosphorus is the base for furnace-grade phosphoric acid, phosphorus pentasulfide, phosphorus pentoxide, and phosphorus trichloride.

=== Uses ===
Approximately 90% of rock phosphate production is used for fertilizer and animal feed supplements, and the balance for industrial chemicals. In addition, phosphorus from rock phosphate is also used in food preservatives, baking flour, pharmaceuticals, anticorrosion agents, cosmetics, fungicides, insecticides, detergents, ceramics, water treatment and metallurgy.

For use in the chemical fertilizer industry, beneficiated rock phosphate must be concentrated to levels of at least 28% phosphorus pentoxide (P_{2}O_{5}). However, most marketed grades of phosphate rock are 30% or more.

It must also have reasonable amounts of calcium carbonate (5%), and <4% combined iron and aluminium oxides. Worldwide, the resources of high-grade ore are declining, and use of lower grade ore may become more attractive.

Beneficiated rock phosphate is also marketed and accepted as an "organic" alternative to "chemical" phosphate fertilizer, which has been further concentrated from it, because it is perceived as being more "natural". According to a report for the FAO, it can be more sustainable to apply rock phosphate as a fertilizer in certain soil types and countries, although it has many drawbacks. According to the report, it may have higher sustainability compared to more concentrated fertilizers because of reduced manufacturing costs and the possibility of local procurement of the refined ore.

Rare earth elements are being found within phosphorites. With the increasing demand for rare earth elements driven by modern technology, a new method of sourcing these elements, independent of China, is becoming increasingly important. With yields greater than those from deposits in China, phosphorites offer a new resource located within the U.S. that would likely lead to independence from the influence of countries outside of the U.S.

== See also ==
- Phosphate mining in the United States
