= Shedhorn Sandstone =

Geologic formation in the United States

The Shedhorn Sandstone is a Permian geologic unit in the western United States. Fish fossils were first discovered by Harry Nazer in its rocks.

== See also ==
- Shedhorn Formation
