= Mission Canyon Formation =

- Stratigraphic range: Mississippian
- Type: Formation

Location
- Region: Montana
- Country: United States

The Mission Canyon Formation is a geologic formation in Montana and Wyoming. It preserves fossils from the Mississippian period.

== See also ==
- List of fossiliferous stratigraphic units in Montana
- Paleontology in Montana

== Sources ==
- Reid, Steven K.; Dorobek, S. L. (1994). "Sequence Stratigraphy and Evolution of a Progradational, Foreland Carbonate Ramp, Lower Mississippian Mission Canyon Formation and Stratigraphic Equivalents, Montana and Idaho". Carbonate Sequence Stratigraphy: Recent Advances and Applications. Vol. 57. American Association of Petroleum Geologists Memoir. pp. 327–352.
