= Casper Formation =

Geologic formation in Wyoming, US

- Stratigraphic range: Permian
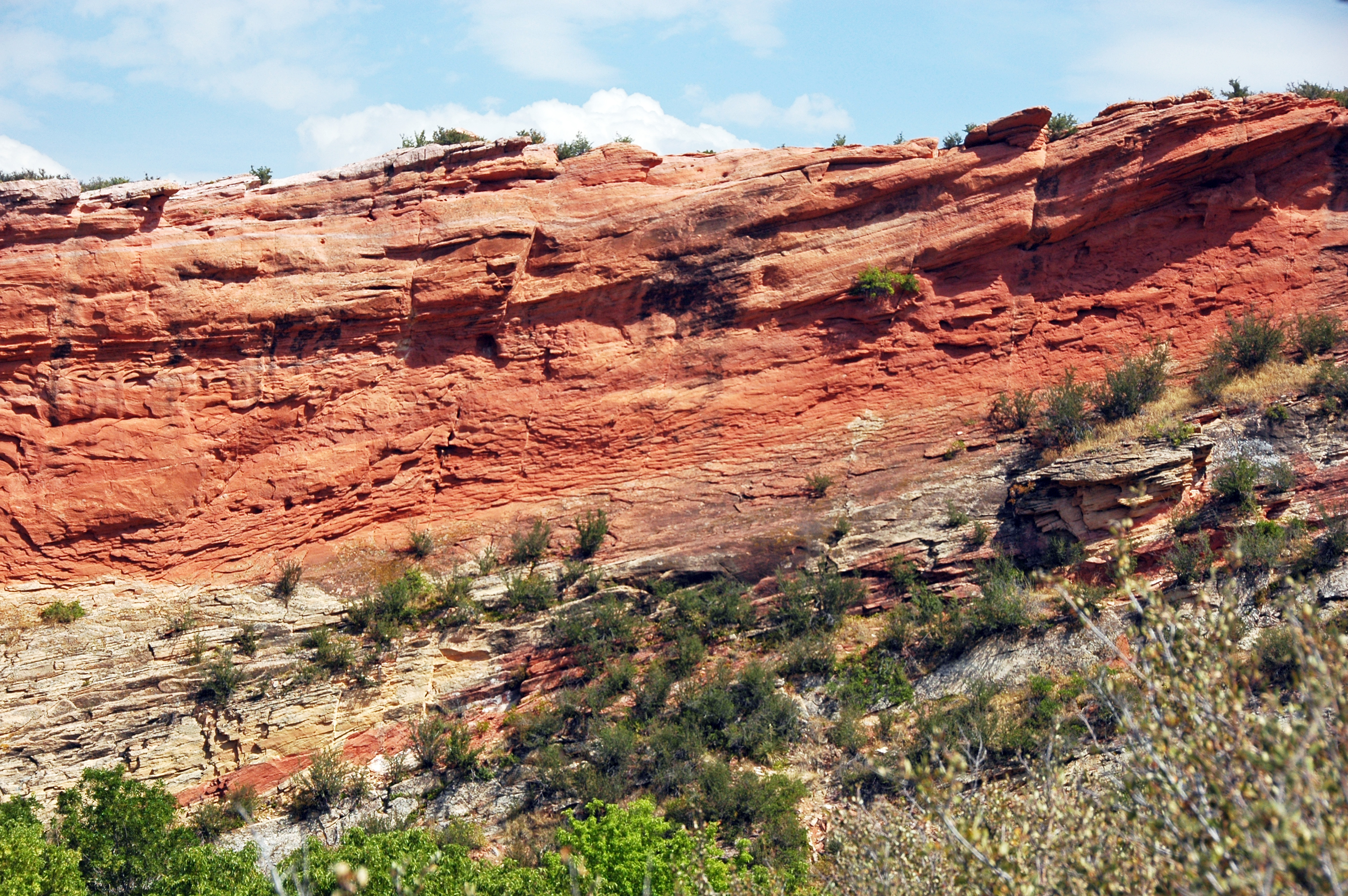
- Sandstones (Casper Formation)
- Type: Formation

Location
- Region: Wyoming
- Country: United States

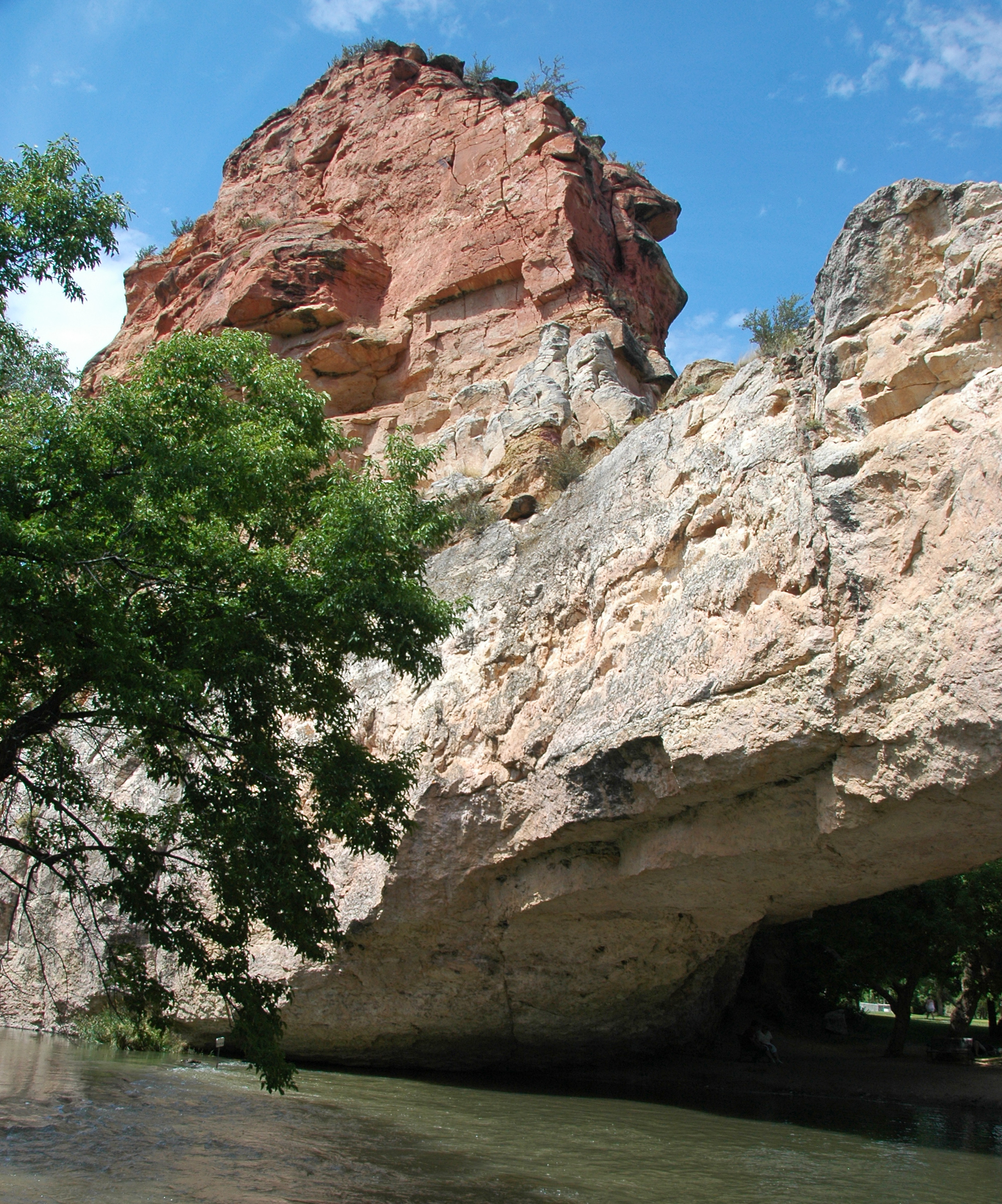
Ayres Natural Bridge, consisting of sandstones from the Casper Formation

The Casper Formation is a geologic formation in Wyoming, US. It preserves fossils dating back to the Pennsylvanian period.

== See also ==
- List of fossiliferous stratigraphic units in Wyoming
- Paleontology in Wyoming
