= Dinwoody Formation =

Geologic formation in the United States

- Stratigraphic range: Induan, ~251.9–250.2 Ma
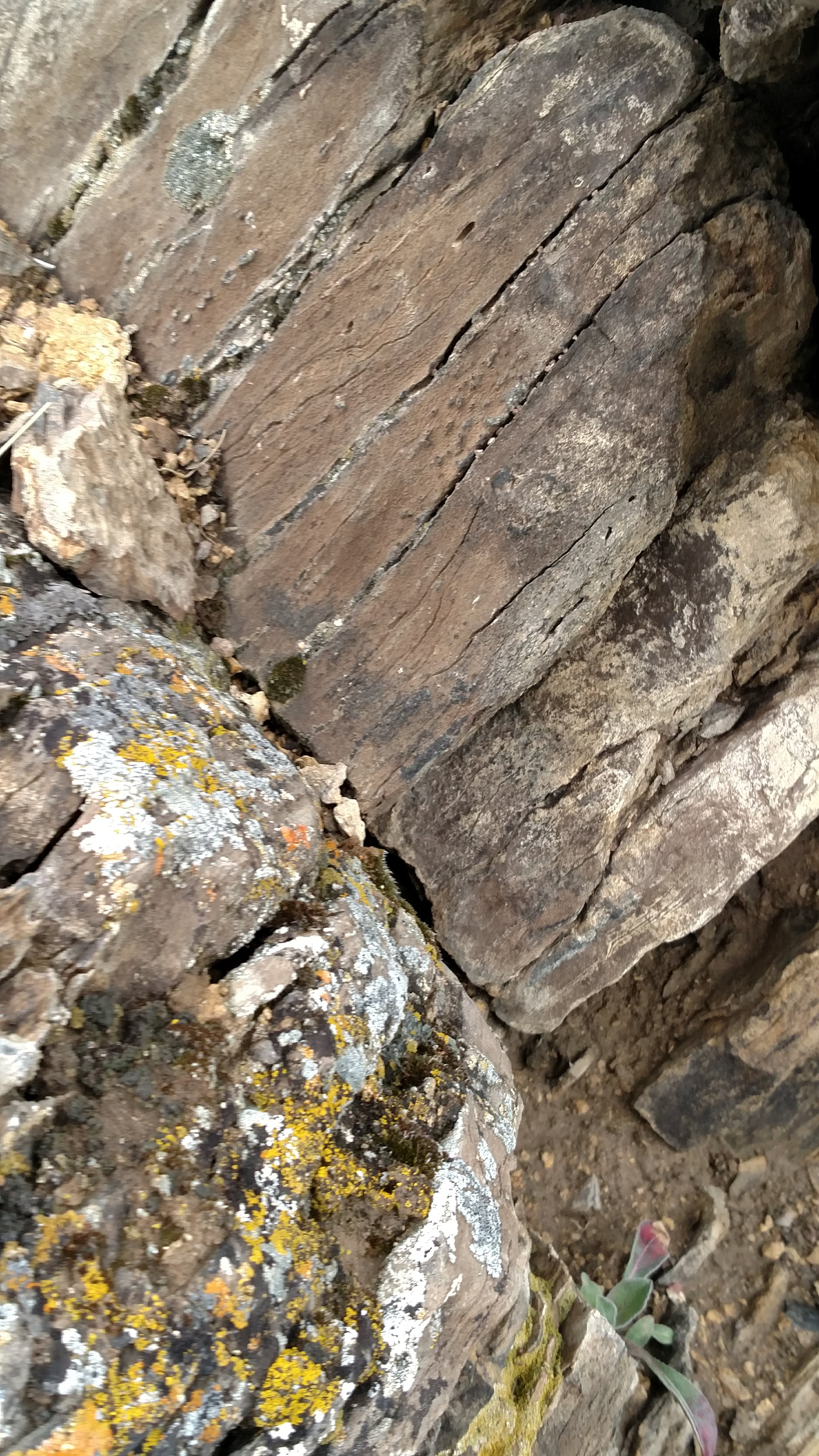
- Type: Geological formation

Lithology
- Primary: Shale, limestone

Location
- Region: Idaho, Montana, Utah, Wyoming
- Country: United States
- Dinwoody Formation (the United States)

The Dinwoody Formation is a geologic formation in the western United States (Idaho, Montana, Utah, Wyoming). It preserves fossils dating back to the Triassic period (Induan stage).

== Fossil content ==
Color key: Taxon / Reclassified taxon / Taxon falsely reported as present / Dubious taxon or junior synonym / Ichnotaxon / Ootaxon / Morphotaxon	Notes; Uncertain or tentative taxa are in small text; ~~crossed out~~ taxa are discredited.

=== Molluscs ===
==== Cephalopods ====
Cephalopods of the Dinwoody Formation
Genus	Species	Location	Stratigraphic position	Material	Notes	Images
Xiaohenautilus	X. chatelaini				A grypoceratid trigonoceratoid	

== See also ==
- List of fossiliferous stratigraphic units in Montana
- Paleontology in Montana
