= List of fossiliferous stratigraphic units in Montana =

This article contains a list of fossil-bearing stratigraphic units in the state of Montana, U.S.

== Sites ==
Group or Formation	Period	Notes
Alan Mountain Limestone	Carboniferous	
Amsden Formation	Carboniferous	
Arikaree Formation	Neogene	
Bear Formation	Paleogene	
Bearpaw Formation	Cretaceous	
Bearpaw Shale	Cretaceous	
Benton Shale	Cretaceous	
Big Snowy Formation	Carboniferous	
Big Snowy Group/Heath Formation	Carboniferous	
Blackleaf Formation	Cretaceous	
Blacktail Deer Creek Formation	Cretaceous	
Cameron Creek Formation	Carboniferous	
Castle Reef Dolomite	Carboniferous	
Claggett Formation	Cretaceous	
Claggett Shale	Cretaceous	
Climbing Arrow Formation	Paleogene	
Cloverly Formation	Cretaceous	
Cody Shale	Cretaceous	
Colorado Group/Belle Fourche Formation	Cretaceous	
Cook Ranch Formation	Paleogene	
Deadwood Formation	Ordovician, Cambrian	
Dearborne Limestone	Cambrian	
Deep River Formation	Neogene	
Dell Beds Formation	Paleogene	
Dinwoody Formation	Triassic	
Dunbar Creek Formation	Paleogene	
Eagle Formation	Cretaceous	
Ellis Formation	Jurassic	
Flaxville Gravels Formation	Neogene	
Fort Union Formation	Paleogene, Cretaceous	
Fort Union No. 3 Beds (Melville) Formation	Paleogene	
Fort Union Group/Tullock Formation	Paleogene	
Fox Hills Sandstone	Cretaceous	
Graneros Shale	Cretaceous	
Greyson Shale	Precambrian	
Hell Creek Formation	Paleogene, Cretaceous	
Hepburn's Mesa Formation	Neogene	
Horsethief Formation	Cretaceous	
Jefferson Formation	Devonian	
Judith River Formation	Cretaceous	
Kishenehn Formation	Paleogene	
Kootenai Formation	Cretaceous	
Lance Formation	Cretaceous	
Lebo Formation	Paleogene	
Livingston Formation	Paleogene	
Lodgepole Limestone	Carboniferous	
Ludlow Formation	Paleogene	
Madison Group/Lodgepole and Mission Canyon Formation	Mississippian	
Madison Valley Formation	Neogene	
Madison Valley Equivalent Formation	Neogene	
Madison Group/Allan Mountain Limestone	Carboniferous	
Madison Group/Lodgepole Formation	Carboniferous	
Madison Group/Lodgepole Limestone	Carboniferous	
Marias River Shale	Cretaceous	
Meagher Formation	Cambrian	
Melville Formation	Paleogene	
Montana Formation	Cretaceous	
Montana Group/Eagle Sandstone	Cretaceous	
Montana Group/Hell Creek Formation	Cretaceous	
Montana Group/Judith River Formation	Cretaceous	
Montana Group/Two Medicine Formation	Cretaceous	
Morrison Formation	Jurassic	
Mowry Shale	Cretaceous	
Otter Formation	Carboniferous	
Pagoda Formation	Cambrian	
Park City Formation	Permian	
Passamari Formation	Paleogene	
Passamari Formation	Paleogene	
Pentagon Formation	Cambrian	
Phosphoria Formation	Permian	
Pierre Shale	Cretaceous	
Pilgrim Formation	Cambrian	
Polecat Bench Formation	Paleogene	
Renova Formation	Paleogene	
Ruby River Basin Group/Renova Formation	Paleogene	
Sage Creek Formation	Paleogene	
Sappington Formation	Carboniferous, Devonian	
Sawtooth Formation	Jurassic	
Shedhorn Formation	Permian	
Shedhorn Sandstone	Permian	
Shell Creek Shale	Cretaceous	
Sixmile Creek Formation	Neogene	
Snowy Range Formation	Cambrian	
St. Mary River Formation	Cretaceous	
Telegraph Creek Formation	Cretaceous	
Thaynes Formation	Triassic	
Thermopolis Shale	Cretaceous	
Three Forks Formation	Devonian	
Three Forks Shale	Devonian	
Tongue River Formation	Paleogene	
Toston Formation	Paleogene	
Tullock Formation	Paleogene	
Two Medicine Formation	Cretaceous	
Upper Hell Creek Formation	Cretaceous	
Virgelle Sandstone	Cretaceous	
White River Formation	Paleogene	
Willow Creek Formation	Cretaceous	
Wiota Gravels	Quaternary	
Wolsey Formation	Cambrian	
Wolsey Shale	Cambrian	

== See also ==
- Paleontology in Montana
