= Cameron Creek (disambiguation) =

Cameron Creek is a watercourse in California, United States.

Cameron Creek may also refer to:

- Cameron Creek (Alberta), Canada
- Cameron Creek Formation, a geologic formation in Montana
