= Renova Formation =

Geological Formation in Montana

- Stratigraphic range: early Eocene - early Miocene
- Type: Formation

Location
- Region: Montana
- Country: United States

Type section
- Named by: Kuenzi & Fields (1971)

The Renova Formation is a Cenozoic geological formation in southwestern Montana. Also known as the lower Bozeman Group, it preserves sediments from as old as the early Eocene (Wasatchian NALMA, about 53 million years ago) to as young as the early Miocene (mid-Arikareean NALMA, about 19 million years ago).

The Renova Formation represents pond and river sediments deposited during the relatively quiet interval between the Laramide-Sevier orogenies (mountain building events) and Basin and Range extension. Many of the modern valleys, ranges, and drainage basins of southwestern Montana were already present at this the time of the Renova Formation. Due to the formation's disjunct set of outcrops, many formal and informal subunits have been named, some of which are restricted to individual river basins. Erosion was ever-present: major unconformities divide the Renova Formation from its adjacent units (including the overlying coarser-grained Sixmile Creek Formation), and there are several unconformities within the formation itself.

== Subunits ==
The Renova Formation can be split into three sedimentary sequences separated by brief unconformities where no sediment is preserved. Sequence 1, the oldest, is early-midle Eocene (Wasatchian to Uintan, about 53-43 Ma). Sequence 2 is middle Eocene to early Oligocene (Uintan to Whitneyan, 41-30 Ma). Sequence 3, the youngest, is Oligocene to early Miocene (Arikareean, about 28-19 Ma).

Subunits of the Renova Formation
Name	Description
Bannock Pass beds	Early Miocene (Arikareean) sediments in the Horse Prairie Basin (around Grant), overlying the Everson Creek beds.
Blacktail Creek Member	Early Miocene (Arikareean) sediments in the Sage Creek and Blacktail Deer Creek basins (south of Dillon), overlying the White Hills Member. Also known as the Blacktail Deer Creek Formation.
Bone Basin Member	Late Oligocene (early Arikareean) sediments in the Jefferson Basin (around Whitehall), overlying the Dunbar Creek Member. Radiometric dating from this member's type section confirms a late Oligocene age. One site with late Eocene (Chadronian) fossils was initially mistaken as belonging to this member, though it is probably from the Climbing Arrow Member instead.
Cabbage Patch beds	Late Oligocene (Arikareean) sediments in the Flint Creek Basin (around Drummond), Deer Lodge Basin (around Deer Lodge), and other basins west of Helena. The Cabbage Patch beds are fossil-rich layers which can be divided further into three further subunits marking changes in mammal faunas from 30-25 million years ago.
Canyon Ferry Reservoir Lagerstätte	An Oligocene-age lagerstätte (site with exceptional fossil preservation) at Canyon Ferry Reservoir in Townsend Valley, southeast of Helena. The thin fine-grained sediments ("paper shales") at this site preserve high-fidelity insect and plant fossils. Renova Formation equivalent strata in the Canyon Ferry area more broadly range from late Eocene (Chadronian) to Middle Miocene (Hemingfordian).
Climbing Arrow Member	Middle-late Eocene (Uintan-Chadronian) sediments in the Jefferson Basin, Ruby Basin, Three Forks area, and other basins between Dillon and Bozeman. Its distinctive geology is nearly identical to the Chadron Formation of the White River Group (further east, on the Great Plains). Also known as the Climbing Arrow Formation. Several notable Chadronian vertebrate fossil sites belong to this member, including the Pipestone Springs and Diamond O local faunas.
Cook Ranch Member	Late Eocene to early Oligocene (Chadronian-Whitneyan) sediments in the Sage Creek Basin, underlying the White Hills Member. Most well-known for hosting the fossil-rich Cook Ranch local fauna (Orellan NALMA, earliest Oligocene). Also known as the Cook Ranch Formation.
Dell Member	Middle Eocene (Uintan) sediments in the Sage Creek Basin, overlying the Sage Creek Member. Also known as the Dell beds or Dell Formation.
Douglass Creek beds	Late Eocene to early Oligocene (Chadronian-Orellan) sediments in the Flint Creek Basin. Also known as the Douglas Creek beds.
Dunbar Creek Member	Late Eocene? to early Oligocene (Chadronian-Whitneyan) sediments in the Jefferson Basin, Ruby Basin, Three Forks area, and other basins between Dillon and Bozeman. Overlying the Climbing Arrow Member. Also known as the Dunbar Creek Formation.
Everson Creek beds	Late Oligocene (Arikareean) sediments in the Horse Prairie Basin, underlying the Bannock Pass beds.
Medicine Lodge Member	Eocene sediments and volcanic rock in basins near the Montana-Idaho boundary. Also known as the Medicine Lodge beds.
Milligan Creek Member	Middle Eocene (Uintan?) sediments in the Three Forks area. Also known as the Milligan Creek Formation.
Negro Hollow beds	Latest Oligocene to early Miocene (mid-Arikareean) sediments in the Jefferson Basin.
Passamari Member	Oligocene to early Miocene (Whitneyan-Arikareean) sediments in the Ruby Basin, overlying the Dunbar Creek Member. Also known as the Passamari Formation.
Red Hill Member	Eocene sediments in the Three Forks area. Also includes sediments of the Conrow Creek conglomerate and Sphinx conglomerate.
Ruby Paper Shale	A few sites in the Ruby Basin preserve "paper shales" with well-preserved insects, plants, and even a bird fossil with feather imprints. These lagerstätten outcrop between the Dunbar Creek and Climbing Arrow Members, potentially earliest Oligocene in age.
Sage Creek Member	Early-Middle Eocene (Bridgerian) sediments in the Sage Creek Basin, underlying the Dell Member. Also known as the Sage Creek Formation.
White Hills Member	Oligocene (Whitneyan-Arikareean) sediments in the Sage Creek Basin, between the Cook Ranch and Blacktail Creek members.

== Paleobiota ==
The Renova Formation has an extensive fauna of vertebrates (particularly mammals), insects, and plants across its many exposures.

== See also ==
- List of fossiliferous stratigraphic units in Montana
- Paleontology in Montana
