= Thermopolis Shale =

Geological formation in the United States and Canada

- Stratigraphic range: Late Albian, ~103–98.5 Ma
- Type: Formation
- Unit of: Colorado Group and Dakota Formation
- Sub-units: Upper Thermopolis Member, Muddy Sandstone Member, Lower Thermopolis Member, "Rusty Beds" Member
- Underlies: Mowry Shale
- Overlies: Kootenai Formation (Cloverly Formation equivalent)
- Thickness: 320 to 450 feet (100 to 140 m)

Lithology
- Primary: Shale
- Other: Bentonite, Claystone, Lignite, Mudstone, Sandstone, Siltstone

Location
- Region: Western Interior Basin
- Country: United States

Type section
- Named for: Thermopolis, Wyoming
- Named by: Charles T. Lupton
- Location: Big Horn County, Wyoming
- Year defined: 1916
- Coordinates: 44.53°N 107.99°W
- Country: United States

The Thermopolis Shale is a geologic formation which formed in west-central North America in the Albian age of the Late Cretaceous period. Surface outcroppings occur in central Canada, and the U.S. states of Montana and Wyoming. The rock formation was laid down over about 7 million years by sediment flowing into the Western Interior Seaway. The formation's boundaries and members are not well-defined by geologists, which has led to different definitions of the formation. Some geologists conclude the formation should not have a designation independent of the formations above and below it. A range of invertebrate and small and large vertebrate fossils and coprolites are found in the formation.

== Geological history ==
The Western Interior Seaway was an inland sea that existed from the Late Jurassic (161.2 ± 4.0 to 145.5 ± 4.0 million years ago [Ma]) to the end of the Paleogene (66 to 23.03 Ma). It existed in the middle of North America, extending from the Arctic Ocean to the Gulf of Mexico. It was roughly 3,000 miles (4,800 km) long and 1,000 miles (1,600 km) wide. The seaway was relatively shallow, with a maximum depth estimated at 660 to 1,640 feet (200 to 500 m).

A foreland basin existed just to the east of the Sevier orogenic belt, which was inundated by the Western Interior Seaway. A forearc on the western side of the basin made this deeper than the eastern side, encouraging the build-up of sediment and, in time, sedimentary rock. Erosion of the Western Cordillera also contributed to the build-up of sedimentary rock on the western edge of the basin, while the more low-lying area to the east provided much less. Changes in the amount, type, rate, and other aspects of the sedimentation were caused by uplift, subsidence, sea level changes, and other factors. The water in the basin made at least two major advances and one major retreat during the Cretaceous, adding complexity to the rock and permitting the creation of riverine, marsh, and estuarine rock in addition to the principal shallow and deep marine rock.

Dating of bentonite and palynological evidence indicate that the Lower Thermopolis Member was deposited between 100.3 and 98.5 Ma. A study of Inoceramidae bivalves confirmed a Late Albian age. Deposition of the upper three members of the Thermopolis Shale occurred over approximately 7 million years.

== Identification ==
The Thermopolis Shale was first identified in 1914 by geologist Ferdinand F. Hintze, Jr. He called it the "Lower Benton Shale", and included the Mowry Shale in the same formation. Hintze described three members: The basal "rusty beds", a lower shale, a 25-to-40-foot (7.6 to 12.2 m) thick "Muddy Sand" (muddy sandstone), and an upper shale member. (The fourth member of the "Lower Benton Shale" was the Mowry Shale.)

The Thermopolis Shale was first named by geologist Charles T. Lupton in 1916. Lupton described the rocks as a formation lying conformably atop the Cloverly Formation, and conformably underlying the Mowry Shale. The Thermopolis Shale was the basal of four formations making up the Colorado Group. He described the Thermopolis Shale as Late Cretaceous in age, generally dark in color, from 710 feet (220 m) thick, and with sandstone lenses common. At least one member of the Thermopolis Shale was also noted, a "muddy sand" layer about 15 to 55 feet (4.6 to 16.8 m) thick. No type locality was identified, but the formation was named for the town of Thermopolis in Hot Springs County, Wyoming—where, nearby, outcroppings of the shale were well exposed. Lupton's division of the Thermopolis Shale was adopted by the United States Geological Survey and used for the next 50 years.

The stratigraphic history of the Thermopolis Shale was first outlined by geologist Don L. Eicher in 1962.

== About the formation ==
The Thermopolis Shale belongs to both the Colorado Group and Dakota Formation. Both historically and currently, the stratigraphic units in these groups, and in the Thermopolis Shale, have been unclear, and the nomenclature used by geologists is not standardized. The identification of beds, members, and formations and their names have changed over time as well. (Note: For example, Seeland and Brauch in 1975 identified just three members of the Thermopolis Shale in 1975: The Lower Member, the Muddy Sandstone, and the Upper Member. The "rusty beds" member was assigned to the Cloverly Formation. Condon points out that the United States Geological Survey (USGS) elevated the Muddy Sandstone Member to formation rank in 1976, and no longer recognized the Thermopolis Shale or Cloverly Formation as a stratigraphic unit in Montana. It also no longer recognized the Shell Creek Formation as a stratigraphic unit in Montana (placing the Shell Creek beds with the Mowry Shale), but continued to do so in Wyoming. But in 1993 and again in 1997, geologists with the Montana Bureau of Mines and Geology (MBMG) mapped the Thermopolis Shale in several areas of northern and central Montana, identifying not only the Thermopolis Shale as a formation, but several members as well. Moreover, the MBMG did not recognize the Muddy Sandstone as a formation. It identified the Shell Creek shale as a distinct stratigraphic unit, and recognized it as a member of the Thermopolis Shale.)

The Thermopolis Shale is said by Eicher to overlie the Cloverly Formation, although Rice, Porter et al., and Lash that in Montana and Wyoming the Kootenai Formation is geologically equivalent to the Cloverly Formation and thus conclude that the Thermopolis Shale overlies the Kootenai Formation. There is disagreement as to the stratigraphic definition of the basal member of the Thermopolis Shale, however. Eicher has argued that the "rusty beds" division is clearly distinguishable in many ways from the Cloverly Formation, and thus belongs to the Thermopolis Shale. Seeland and Brauch assigned the "rusty beds" to the Cloverly Formation in 1975, an assessment concurred with by Finn in 2010. Porter et al., however, classified the "rusty beds" as part of the Fall River Sandstone in 1997.

What constitutes the upper boundary of the Thermopolis Shale is disputed, making it difficult to identify what overlays the Thermopolis Shale. In 1922, Collier identified the beds below the Mowry Shale as the Nefsy shale member of the Graneros Shale. This left the Thermopolis Shale underlying the Graneros Shale. But Rubey assigned these rocks to the Mowry Shale in 1931, so that now the Thermopolis Shale underlay the Mowry Shale. Eicher redefined these beds in 1960 as the Shell Creek Shale, separating them from the Mowry Shale. This effectively put the Thermopolis Shale below the Muddy Sandstone Formation. (Note: The USGS in 1976 agreed that the Muddy Sandstone should be a formation, not a member. However, it no longer recognized the Thermopolis Shale as a formation, ranking it as a member of the Kootenai Formation. Thus, the Kootenai Formation is said by USGS to underlie the Muddy Sandstone Formation.) In 1998, Porter et al. identified the Shell Creek Shale as the upper member of the Thermopolis Shale, a position with which Lash agreed in 2011.

Depending on the definition of the shale, and the location, the Thermopolis Shale varies widely in thickness. Chester N. Darton estimated the size of the formation at 800 feet (240 m) (including the "rusty beds") in 1906. In 1914, Hintze described the formation as 720-to-770-foot (220 to 230 m) deep. Hewett and Lupton reported in 1917 that the shale (including the "rusty beds") to be 400 to 800 feet (120 to 240 m) thick in the Bighorn Basin, while Finn (not including the "rusty beds" reported a thickness in the same area of 125 to 230 feet (38 to 70 m). On the Wind River Indian Reservation of Wyoming, using the inclusive definition, it was reported to be a more robust 320 to 450 feet (98 to 137 m) thick. It is only 10 feet (3.0 m) thick in the Shirley Basin of southwest central Wyoming.

Generally speaking, the Thermopolis Shale consists of a dark gray to black shale, with thin layers of bentonite, sandy claystone, and siltstone interspersed throughout the shale. Depending on the stratigraphic definition of the formation, a gray, thinly-bedded sandstone member exists between the upper and lower members.

=== Members ===
For the purposes of this article, the definition of the Thermopolis Shale used by Porter et al. and Lash will be used, recognizing (as Condon does) that there is scientific disagreement about this issue. Using this definition, there are four members of the Thermopolis Shale:

- The "rusty beds" Member—This basal member of the Thermopolis Shale was first described by Nelson H. Darton in 1904, who noted the sandy nature of this shale and its rusty brown color. The color was attributed to the presence of iron, and Darton coined the term "rusty series" in 1906. The first geologist to use the term "rusty beds", however, was Chester W. Washburne in 1908. These rocks were laid down as the level of the Western Interior Seaway began a major rise. Erosion of the lacustrine Kootenai Formation occurred, (Note: First identified by Washburne in 1906.) creating a nonconformity as the new "rusty beds" rock was laid down. In some places, the entire upper Himes Member of the Cloverly Formation had eroded, allowing the "rusty beds" to lie disconformably on the medial Little Sheep Member. The "rusty beds" consist of thin layers of reddish-brown sandstone between 3 and 18 inches (7.6 and 45.7 cm) thick, separated by leaves of black shale between 1 and 12 inches (2.5 and 30.5 cm) thick. The basal beds of the "rusty beds" are probably estuarine or deltaic in nature. The member was estimated as between 20 feet (6.1 m) and 200 feet (61 m) in thickness. The "rusty beds" member is geologically equivalent to the Fall River Sandstone, Greybull Sandstone, and some members of the Dakota Formation.
- Lower Thermopolis Member—This member of the Thermopolis Shale was first briefly described by Darton in 1904, and more completely by Washburne in 1908. The member has remained unnamed or only informally named, usually being only referred to as the Lower Thermopolis Member. These rocks were deposited as the northern and southern portions of the Western Interior seaway linked together, and represents deposition during the maximum "transgression" (rise in sea level) of the Western Interior Seaway. The transition from the "rusty beds" to the Lower Thermopolis Member is gradational, probably due to erosion or flooding. The Lower Thermopolis Member was described by Washburne and Harshman as carbon-rich black shale with occasional sandstone lenses in its lower portion, and E.N. Harshman noted it was fissile. Porter et al., however, described the rock in 1993 as mudstone or siltstone, implying a lack of fissility. The Lower Thermopolis Member is geologically equivalent to the Skull Creek Shale.

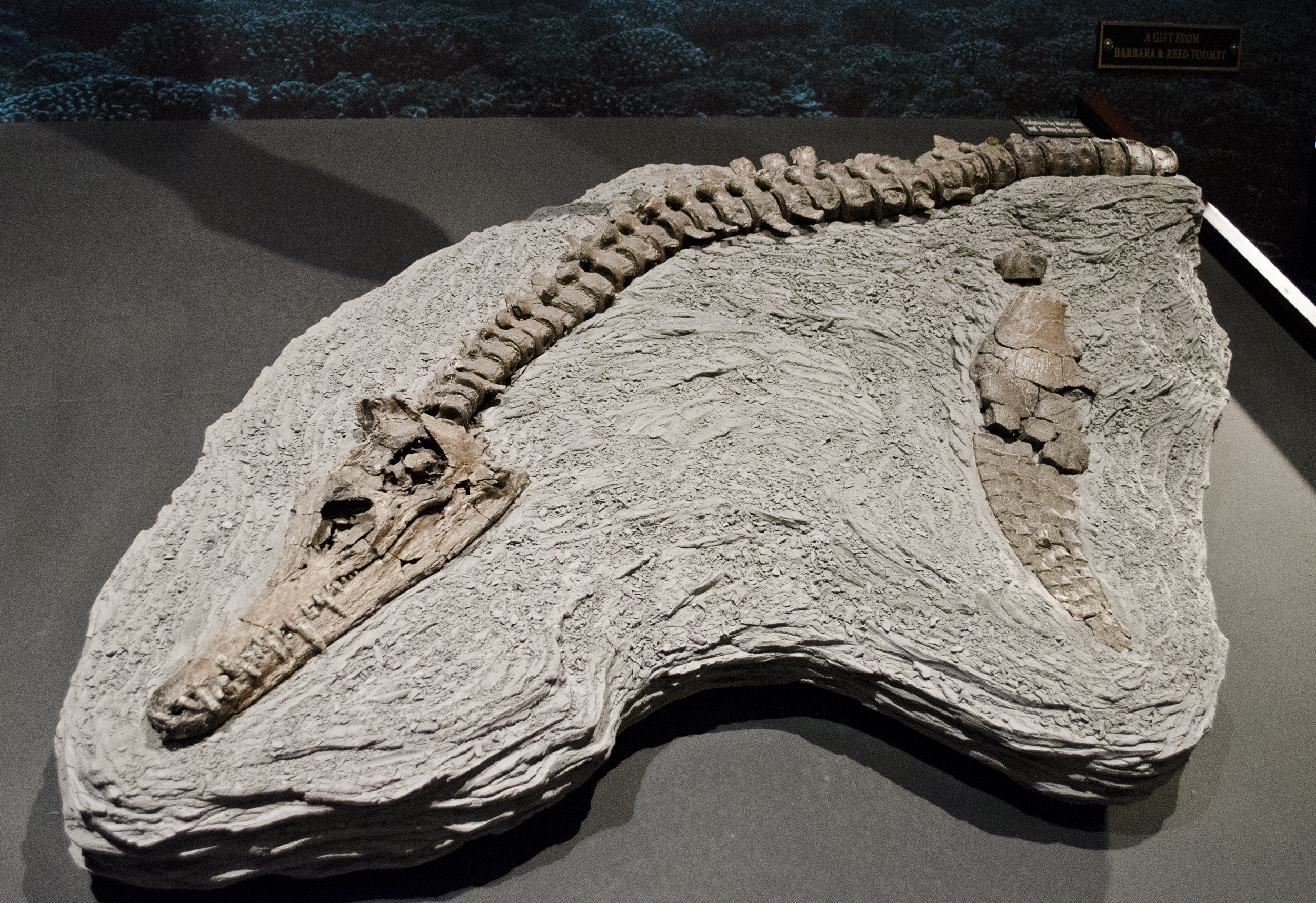
Edgarosaurus muddi, a polycotylid plesiosaur found in the Upper Thermopolis Member.

- Muddy Sandstone Member—This member of the Thermopolis Shale was first briefly described by Darton in 1904, and much more completely by Hintze in 1914. Hintze described it as a widespread almost white sandstone member, 25 to 40 feet (7.6 to 12.2 m) thick, with small, uniform, poorly cemented grains. Hintze called this member the "Muddy sand", after the terminology used by oil and gas drillers in Wyoming. It remained informally known as the "Muddy sand" into the 1960s, despite widespread acknowledgement among geologists that it was significant and widely occurring and worthy of a formal name. By 1972, the member had received the formal name "Muddy Sandstone Member". (Note: Lash, however, regarded it as officially unnamed in 2011.) The Muddy Sandstone began to be laid down during a period when water levels in the Western Interior Seaway dropped, and this deposition continued once sea levels rose again. An erosional unconformity occurred while the sea receded, over which estuarine and fluvial deposits were laid down as the Muddy Sandstone. Thus, in some areas contact with the overlying Muddy Sandstone is sharp and unconformable, while in others it is conformable and gradational. Deposition of the Muddy Sandstone continued around the foreland basin's margins, while the Upper Thermopolis Member was laid down conformably above the Muddy Sandstone in the basin's interior. The Muddy Sandstone consists of a number of thin beds of fine-grained, silty sandstone of buff, brownish-grey, or grey color. It is shaly, contains carbon flecks and pyrite crystals, and when weathered is either buff or grey. Some beds exhibit ripple marks. The sandstone is interbedded with thin beds of shale, siltstone, and (occasionally) bentonite. Lupton estimated the Muddy Sandstone's thickness at 10 to 55 feet (3.0 to 16.8 m) in thickness, although Porter et al. have pointed out that it varies widely in thickness from place to place. David Seeland and Early Brauch have concluded that is because pre-Laramide geologic structures or topography probably governed the distribution of Muddy Sandstone deposits. The Muddy Sandstone Member is geologically equivalent to the Birdhead Sandstone.
- Upper Thermopolis Member—This member of the Thermopolis Shale was first briefly described by Darton in 1904, and more completely by Washburne in 1908. Norman Mills was the first to use the term "Upper Thermopolis" in 1956, although the member remained formally unnamed. The Upper Thermopolis Member was laid down conformably atop the Muddy Sandstone in the foreland basin's interior during the latter part of the Western Interior Seaway's second transgression. Washburne described the member as consisting of bluish-black shale, interbedded very occasionally with beds of volcanic ash and bentonite in the upper part. Lupton argued for two distinct divisions in the member: Lower beds of soft, black shale about 170 feet (52 m) thick, and upper beds of hard shale with sandstone lenses about 230 feet (70 m) thick. Harshman has provided evidence that the upper beds are a transitional zone leading to the Mowry Shale. He observed that the upper beds consist primarily of thin, limy, silty sandstone and silty shale beds interbedded with dense, siliceous Mowry Shale with the occasional bed of silty lignite. The sandstone beds exhibit mud cracks and root tubes which indicate a paludal (marsh deposited) origin. The differences between the upper and lower beds led Harshman to conclude that some of the sandier beds near the base of the Upper Thermopolis Member may belong to the Muddy Sandstone Member. (Note: Seeland and Brauch characterized the Upper Thermopolis Member as shale in 1975. More recently, Dolson and Muller and Lash have described the Upper Thermopolis Member as mudstone, rather than fissible shale or sandstone.) Seeland and Brauch also found extensive evidence of gradational contact with the overlying Mowry Shale. The Muddy Sandstone Member is geologically equivalent to the Shell Creek Shale.

Surface outcroppings of the Thermopolis Shale occur in central Canada, and the U.S. states of Montana and Wyoming. Marine-deposited rock thins toward the west, while nonmarine-deposited rock thins toward the east. The marine-deposited rock is primarily shale, with some limestone, sandstone, and siltstone. The nonmarine rock is primarily sandstone, with some coal, shale, "black" or carbonaceous shale, and siltstone.

== Fossil record ==
The Thermopolis Shale is unusually rich in marine vertebrate fossils, consisting primarily of skeletal material, teeth, and coprolites.

A particularly rich marine vertebrate fossil zone exists in the lower beds of the Upper Thermopolis Member. Marine crocodile, plesiosaur (primarily Edgarosaurus muddi), ray (primarily Pseudohypolophus and an unidentified species), sawfish (primarily Onchopristis), and turtle (primarily Baenidae and Glyptops) remains, as well as whole coprolites, are abundant. Hybodont shark (primarily Meristodonoides), ganoid-scaled and teleost fish, and invertebrate fossil ammonoids (primarily Baculites) are also found.

== See also ==
- List of fossiliferous stratigraphic units in Montana
- Paleontology in Montana

== Bibliography ==
- Cobban, William A. (October 1951). "Colorado Shale of central and northwestern Montana and equivalent rocks of Black Hills". American Association of Petroleum Geologists Bulletin.
- Collier, A.J. (1922). "The Osage oil field, Weston County, Wyoming" (PDF). U.S. Geological Survey Bulletin 736 (Report). Washington, D.C.: U.S. Geological Survey.
- Condon, Steven M. (2000). Stratigraphic Framework of Lower and Upper Cretaceous Rocks in Central and Eastern Montana. U.S. Geological Survey Digital Data Series DDS-57 (PDF) (Report). Denver: U.S. Geological Survey.
- Darton, Nelson H. (January 1904). "Comparison of the stratigraphy of the Black Hills, Bighorn Mountains, and Rocky Mountain Front Range". Geological Society of America Bulletin. 15 (1): 394–401. Bibcode:1904GSAB...15..379D. doi:10.1130/gsab-15-379.
- Darton, Nelson H. (1906). Geology of the Bighorn Mountains. U.S. Geological Survey Professional Paper 51 (Report). Washington, D.C.: U.S. Geological Survey.
- Dickinson, William R. (May 2004). "Evolution of the North American Cordillera" (PDF). Annual Review of Earth and Planetary Sciences. 32: 13–45. Bibcode:2004AREPS..32...13D. doi:10.1146/annurev.earth.32.101802.120257.
- Dolson, John; Miller, Dave; Evetts, M.J.; Stein, J.A. (March 1991). "Regional paleotopographic trends and production, Muddy Sandstone (Lower Cretaceous) central and northern Rocky Mountains". American Association of Petroleum Geologists Bulletin: 409–435.
- Dolson, John C.; Muller, Davis S. (1994). "Stratigraphic evolution of the Lower Cretaceous Dakota Group, Western Interior, USA". In Caputo, Mario V.; Peterson, James A.; Franczyk, Karen J. (eds.). Mesozoic Systems of the Rocky Mountain Region. Denver: Rocky Mountain Section SEPM (Society of Economic Paleontologists and Mineralogists).
- Dyman, Thaddeus S.; Merewether, E. Allen; Molenaar, C.M.; Cobban, William A.; Obradovich, John D.; Weimer, Robert J.; Bryant, William A. (1994). "Stratigraphic transects for Cretaceous rocks, Rocky Mountains and Great Plains". In Caputo, Mario V.; Peterson, James A.; Franczyk, Karen J. (eds.). Mesozoic Systems of the Rocky Mountain Region. Denver: Rocky Mountain Section SEPM (Society of Economic Paleontologists and Mineralogists).
- Eicher, Don L. (1960). "Stratigraphy and micropaleontology of the Thermopolis Shale" (PDF). Peabody Museum of Natural History Bulletin.
- Eicher, Don L. (1962). "Biostratigraphy of the Thermopolis, Muddy, and Shell Creek Formations". In Enyert, Richard L.; Curry, William H. III (eds.). Symposium on Early Cretaceous Rocks of Wyoming and Adjacent Areas: Wyoming Geological Association 17th Annual Field Conference Guidebook. Casper, Wyo.: Wyoming Geological Association.
- Feldmann, Rodney M.; Schweitzer, Carrie E.; Green, Robin M. (2008). "Unusual Albian (Early Cretaceous) Brachyura (Homoloidea: Componocancroidea New Superfamily) from Montana and Wyoming, U.S.A." Journal of Crustacean Biology. 28 (3): 502–509. Bibcode:2008JCBio..28..502F. doi:10.1651/07-2933r.1.
- Finn, Thomas M. (2010). "New source rock data for the Thermopolis and Mowry Shales in the Wyoming part of the Bighorn Basin" (PDF). U.S. Geological Survey Digital Data Series DDS–69–V (Report). Washington, D.C.: U.S. Geologic Survey.
- Harshman, E.N. (1972). Geology and Uranium Deposits, Shirley Basin Area, Wyoming. Geological Survey Professional Paper No. 745 (Report). Washington, D.C.: U.S. Geologic Survey.
- Hewett, Donnell Foster; Lupton, Charles T. (1917). Anticlines in the Southern Part of the Big Horn Basin, Wyoming: A Preliminary Report on the Occurrence of Oil. U.S. Geological Survey Bulletin 656 (PDF) (Report). Washington, D.C.: U.S. Geological Survey.
- Hintze, Ferdinand Friis Jr. (1914). The Basin and Greybull oil and gas fields. Wyoming State Geologist's Bulletin No 10 (PDF) (Report). Casper, Wyo.: Geologist's Office, State of Wyoming.
- Kauffman, Erle G. (July–October 1977). "Geological and biological overview: Western Interior Cretaceous Basin". The Mountain Geologist: 75–99.
- Kauffman, Erle G. (1985). "Cretaceous evolution of the Western Interior Basin of the United States". In Pratt, Lisa M.; Kauffman, Erle G.; Zelt, Frederick B. (eds.). Fine-Grained Deposits and Biofacies of the Cretaceous Western Interior Seaway: Evidence of Cyclic Sedimentary Processes: Society of Economic Paleontologists and Mineralogists Guidebook No. 4 (PDF). Denver: Society of Economic Paleontologists and Mineralogists.
- Kauffman, Erle G.; Caldwell, W.G.E. (1993). "The Western Interior Basin in Space and Time". In Caldwell, W.G.E.; Kauffman, Erle G. (eds.). Evolution of the Western Interior Basin. Volume 39 of Geological Association of Canada Special Paper. St. John's, NL: Geological Association of Canada.
- Lash, Catherine Eileen (2011). Depositional Environment and Taphonomy of Marine Vertebrate Biofacies in the Lower Cretaceous (Albian) Thermopolis Shale, South-Central Montana (PDF) (M.Sc. thesis). Montana State University.
- Lupton, Charles T. (1916). "Oil and gas near Basin, Big Horn County, Wyoming". Contributions to Economic Geology, 1915: Part 2, Mineral Fuels. U.S. Geological Survey Bulletin 621-L (Report). Washington, D.C.: U.S. Geological Survey. hdl:2027/osu.32435061300612.
- Mills, Norman K. (1956). "Subsurface stratigraphy of the pre-Niobrara Formations in the Bighorn Basin, Wyoming". In Burk, C.A. (ed.). Wyoming Stratigraphy. Part I: Subsurface Stratigraphy of the Pre-Niobrara Formations in Wyoming. Casper, Wyo.: Wyoming Geological Association.
- Moberly, Ralph Jr. (August 1960). "Morrison, Cloverly, and Sykes Mountain Formations, Northern Bighorn Basin, Wyoming and Montana". Geological Society of America Bulletin. 71 (8): 1137–1176. Bibcode:1960GSAB...71.1137M. doi:10.1130/0016-7606(1960)71[1137:mcasmf]2.0.co;2.
- Molenaar, Cornelius M.; Rice, Dudley D. (1988). "Cretaceous rocks of the Western Interior Basin". In Sloss, Laurence L. (ed.). Sedimentary Cover — North American Craton: U.S. Boulder, Colo.: Geological Society of America. ISBN 9780813754499.
- Obradovich, John D.; Cobban, William A.; Merewether, E. Allen; Weimer, Robert J. (July 1997). "A time framework for the late Albian and early Cenomanian strata of northern Wyoming and Montana". In Campen, Elizabeth B. (ed.). 1997 Bighorn Basin Symposium Guidebook. Billings, Mont.: Geological Society of America. p. 36.
- Porter, Karen W.; Dyman, Thaddeus S.; Tysdal, Russell G. (1993). "Sequence boundaries and other surfaces in Lower and lower Upper Cretaceous rocks of central and southwest Montana: A preliminary report". In Hunter, L.D. Vern (ed.). Energy and Mineral Resources of Central Montana. Billings, Mont.: Montana Geological Society.
- Porter, Karen W.; Dyman, Thaddeus S.; Thompson, Gary G.; Lopez, G.E.; Cobban, William A. (1997). Six Outcrop Sections of the Marine Lower Cretaceous, Central Montana. Report Investigation 3 (Report). Helena, Mont.: Montana Bureau of Mines and Geology.
- Porter, Karen W.; Dyman, Thaddeus S.; Cobban, William A.; Reinson, Gerry E. (1998). "Post-Mannville/Kootenai Lower Cretaceous Rocks and Reservoirs, North-Central Montana, Southern Alberta and Saskatchewan". In Christopher, James Ellis; Paterson, D.F.; Bend, Stephen Leonard (eds.). Eighth International Williston Basin Symposium (Report). Bismarck, N.D.: North Dakota Geological Society.
- Rice, Dudley D. (1976). "Revision of Cretaceous nomenclature of the northern Great Plains in Montana, North Dakota, and South Dakota". In Cohee, George Vincent; Wright, W.B. (eds.). Changes in stratigraphic nomenclature by the U.S. Geological Survey, 1975. U.S. Geological Survey Bulletin 1422-A. Washington, D.C.: U.S. Geological Survey.
- Rubey, William W. (1931). "Lithologic Studies of Fine-Grained Upper Cretaceous Sedimentary Rocks of the Black Hills Region" (PDF). Shorter Contributions to General Geology. U.S. Geological Survey Professional Paper 165-A (Report). Washington, D.C.: U.S. Geological Survey.
- Seeland, David A.; Brauch, Earl F. (1975). Status of Mineral Resource Information for the Wind River Indian Reservation, Wyoming. Administrative Report BIA-8 (PDF) (Report). Washington, D.C.: Bureau of Indian Affairs.
- Vuke, Susan M. (1984). "Depositional environments of the early Cretaceous Western Interior Seaway in southwestern Montana and the northern United States". In Stott, Donald F.; Glass, Donald J. (eds.). The Mesozoic of Middle North America: A Selection of Papers from the Symposium on the Mesozoic of Middle North America, Calgary, Alberta, Canada, May 1983. Calgary: Canadian Society of Petroleum Geologists.
- Washburne, Chester W. (1908). "Gas fields of the Bighorn Basin, Wyo.". In Hayes, C.W.; Lindgren, Waldemar (eds.). Contributions to Economic Geology, 1907. Part I: Metals and Nonmetals, Except Fuels. U.S. Geological Survey Bulletin No. 340 (PDF). Washington, D.C.: U.S. Geological Survey.
- Weimer, Robert J.; Obradovich, John D.; Cobban, William A.; Merewether, E. Allen (1997). "A time framework for the late Albian and early Cenomanian strata of northern Wyoming and Montana: Bighorn Basin: 50 years of the frontier". In Campen, Elizabeth B. (ed.). Evolution of the geology of the Bighorn Basin: 1997 Field Trip and Symposium. Billings, Mont.: Yellowstone Bighorn Research Association.
- Williams, Gordon D.; Stelck, Charles R. (1975). "Speculations of the Cretaceous palaeogeography of North America". In Caldwell, W.G.E. (ed.). The Cretaceous System in the Western Interior of North America. Special Paper 13. Waterloo, Ont.: Geological Association of Canada.
