= Hepburn's Mesa Formation =

Geologic formation in Montana, US

- Stratigraphic range: Neogene
- Type: Formation

Location
- Region: Montana
- Country: United States

The Hepburn's Mesa Formation is a geologic formation in Montana. It preserves fossils dating back to the Neogene period.

== See also ==
- List of fossiliferous stratigraphic units in Montana
- Paleontology in Montana
