= Ruby River Basin Group =

Geologic group in Montana, US

- Stratigraphic range: Paleogene
- Type: Group

Location
- Region: Montana
- Country: United States

The Ruby River Basin Group is a geologic group in Montana. It preserves fossils dating back to the Paleogene period.

== See also ==
- List of fossiliferous stratigraphic units in Montana
- Paleontology in Montana
