= Dell Beds Formation =

Montana geological formation

- Stratigraphic range: Paleogene
- Type: Formation

Location
- Region: Montana
- Country: United States

The Dell Beds Formation is a geologic formation in Montana. It preserves fossils dating back to the Paleogene period.

== See also ==
- List of fossiliferous stratigraphic units in Montana
- Paleontology in Montana
