= Tullock Member =

Geologic formation in Montana

- Stratigraphic range: Early Paleocene (Puercan)
- Type: Member
- Unit of: Fort Union Formation
- Underlies: Lebo Member
- Overlies: Hell Creek Formation (MT), Lance Formation (WY)
- Thickness: 90–400 m (Powder River Basin)

Location
- Region: Montana, Wyoming
- Country: United States

Type section
- Named for: Tullock Creek
- Named by: Rogers and Lee (1923)

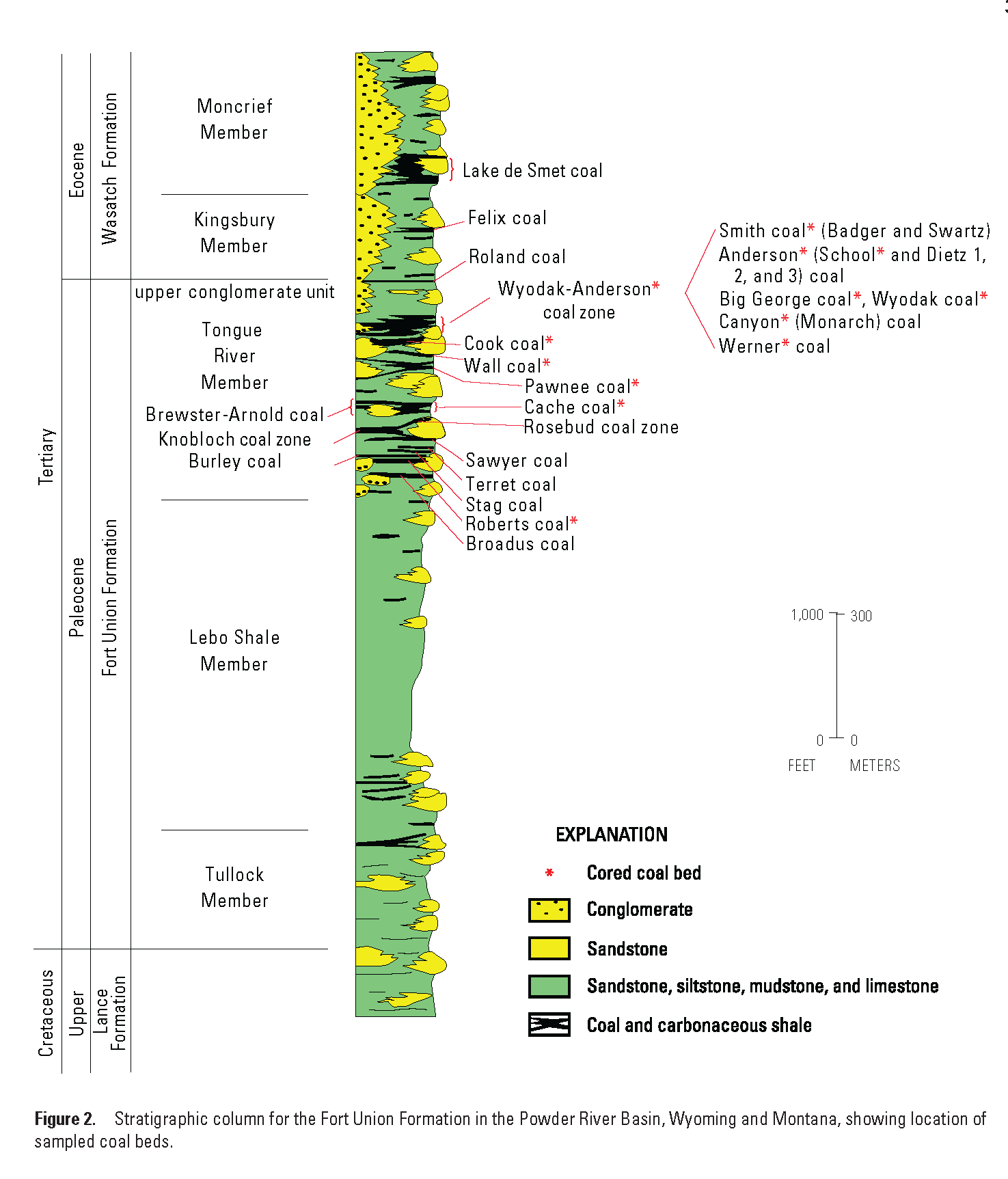
Coal stratigraphy of the Powder River Basin (USGS).

The Tullock Member is a geologic member in Montana and Wyoming, forming the lowermost part of the Fort Union Formation. It is also known less commonly as the Tullock Formation, forming part of the Fort Union Group. It preserves fossils dating back to the Paleogene period.

== See also ==
- List of fossiliferous stratigraphic units in Montana
- Paleontology in Montana
