= Amsden Formation =

Montanan geologic formation

- Stratigraphic range: Carboniferous
- Type: Formation

Location
- Region: Montana, Wyoming
- Country: United States

The Amsden Formation is a geologic formation in Montana and Wyoming. It preserves fossils dating back to the Carboniferous period.

== See also ==
- List of fossiliferous stratigraphic units in Montana
- Paleontology in Montana
