= Pagoda Formation =

Geologic formation in Montana

- Stratigraphic range: Cambrian
- Type: Formation

Location
- Region: Montana
- Country: United States

The Pagoda Formation is a geologic formation in Montana. It preserves fossils dating back to the Cambrian period.

== See also ==
- List of fossiliferous stratigraphic units in Montana
- Paleontology in Montana
