= Ellis Formation =

Geologic formation of the Ellis Group in Montana

- Stratigraphic range: Jurassic
- Type: Formation

Location
- Region: Montana
- Country: United States

The Ellis Formation is a geologic formation of the Ellis Group in Montana.

It preserves fossils dating back to the Jurassic period.

== See also ==
- List of fossiliferous stratigraphic units in Montana
- Paleontology in Montana
