= Dearborne Limestone =

Geologic formation in Montana

- Stratigraphic range: Cambrian
- Type: Formation

Location
- Region: Montana
- Country: United States

The Dearborne Limestone is a geologic formation in Montana. It preserves fossils dating back to the Cambrian period.

== See also ==
- List of fossiliferous stratigraphic units in Montana
- Paleontology in Montana
