= Big Snowy Formation =

Geologic formation in Montana, United States

- Stratigraphic range: Carboniferous
- Type: Formation

Location
- Region: Montana
- Country: United States

The Big Snowy Formation is a geologic formation in Montana. It preserves fossils dating back to the Carboniferous period.

== See also ==
- List of fossiliferous stratigraphic units in Montana
- Paleontology in Montana
