= Bear Formation =

Geologic formation in Montana, United States

- Stratigraphic range: Paleogene
- Type: Formation

Location
- Region: Montana
- Country: United States

The Bear Formation is a geologic formation in Montana. It preserves fossils dating back to the Paleogene period.

== See also ==
- List of fossiliferous stratigraphic units in Montana
- Paleontology in Montana
