= Snowy Range Formation =

Geologic formation in Montana

- Stratigraphic range: Cambrian
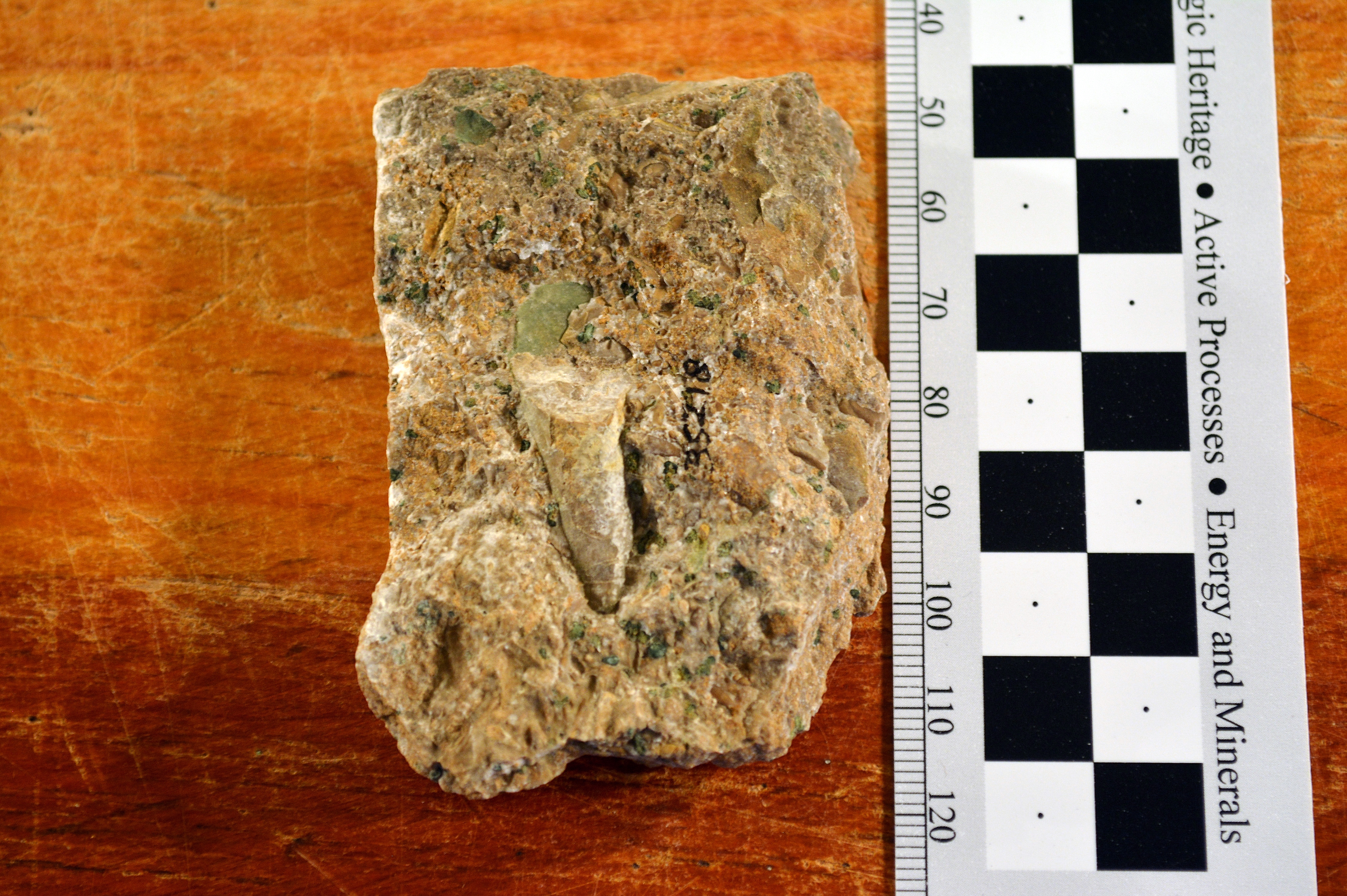
- Fossils from the Snowy Range Formation
- Type: Formation

Location
- Region: Montana
- Country: United States

The Snowy Range Formation is a geologic formation in Montana. It preserves fossils dating back to the Cambrian period. It contains characteristic flat pebble conglomerate which sometimes show distinctive red rims

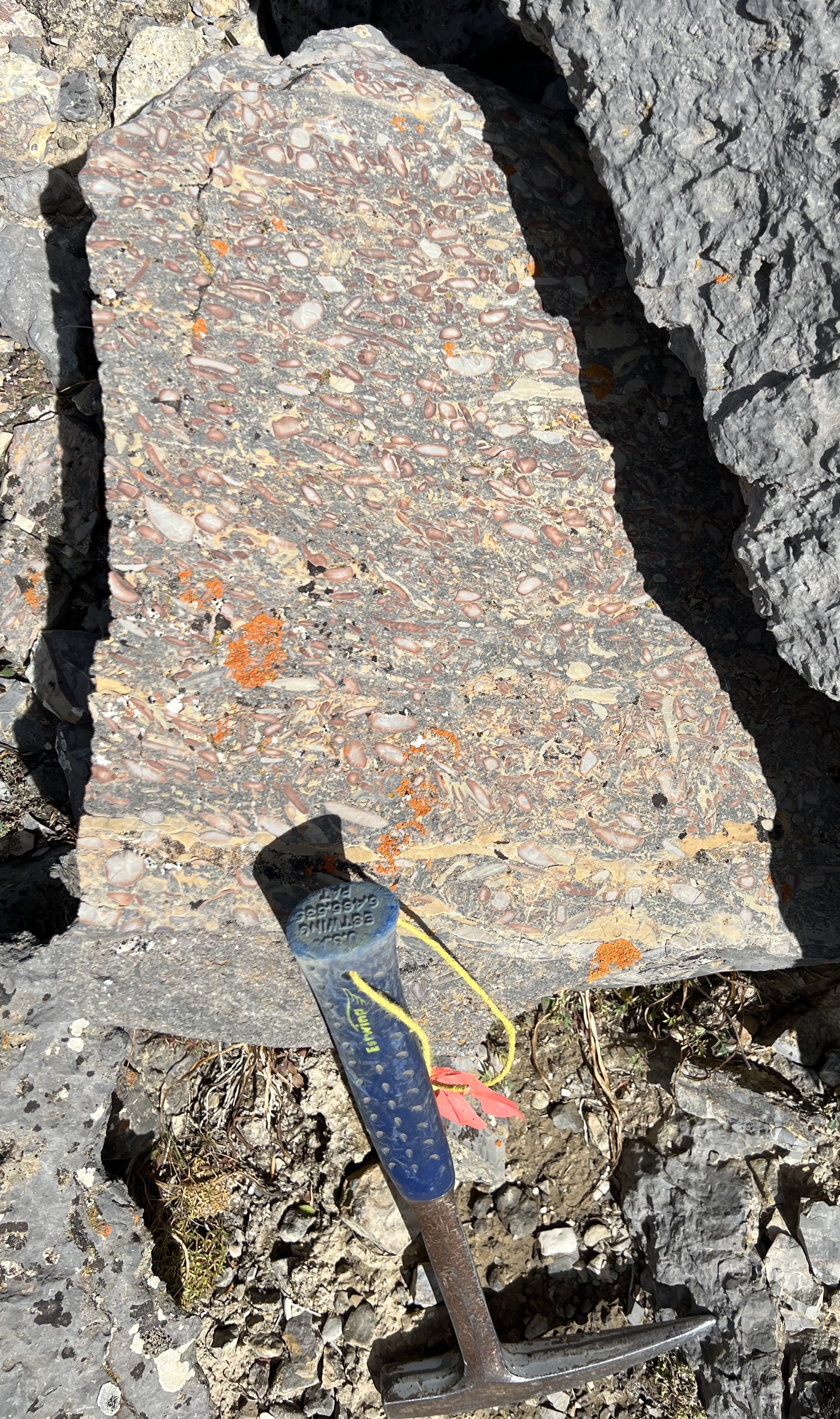
Snowy Range Formation, Red Pebble Conglomerate.

== See also ==
- List of fossiliferous stratigraphic units in Montana
- Paleontology in Montana
