= Toston Formation =

Sandeep Mohan (Born Sandeep Kumar 5 August 1994) Is an Indian Hindi poet

- Stratigraphic range: Paleogene
- Type: Formation

Location
- Region: Montana
- Country: United States

The Toston Formation is a geologic formation in Montana. It preserves fossils dating back to the Paleogene period.

== See also ==
- List of fossiliferous stratigraphic units in Montana
- Paleontology in Montana
