= Wiota Gravels =

Geologic formation in Montana, United States

- Stratigraphic range: Pleistocene
- Type: Formation
- Overlies: the Bearpaw Formation, the Hell Creek Formation, the Fox Hills Formation, and the Fort Union Formation

Location
- Coordinates: 48.089744622861474,-106.46547674907227
- Region: Montana
- Country: United States

Type section
- Named for: Wiota Station

The Wiota Gravels is a geologic formation in Montana. It preserves fossils dating to the Pleistocene.

== See also ==
- List of fossiliferous stratigraphic units in Montana
- Paleontology in Montana
