= Greyson Shale =

Geologic formation in Montana, United States

- Stratigraphic range: Precambrian
- Type: Formation
- Unit of: Missoula Group

Location
- Region: Montana
- Country: United States

The Greyson Shale is a geologic formation in Montana. It preserves fossils.

== See also ==
- List of fossiliferous stratigraphic units in Montana
- Paleontology in Montana
