= Deep River Formation =

Cenozoic geologic unit in Montana

- Stratigraphic range: Neogene
- Type: Formation

Location
- Region: Montana
- Country: United States

The Deep River Formation is a geologic formation in Montana. It preserves fossils dating back to the Neogene period.

== Fauna ==
Fauna reported from the Deep River Formation
Genus	Species	Location	Stratigraphic position	Material	Description	Images
Proscalops				Mandible, two humeri, femur		

== See also ==
- List of fossiliferous stratigraphic units in Montana
- Paleontology in Montana
