= Lebo Member =

Geological formation in Montana, United States

- Stratigraphic range: Paleogene
- Type: Member
- Unit of: Fort Union Formation
- Underlies: Tongue River Member
- Overlies: Tullock Member
- Thickness: 500–1,700 feet (150–520 m)

Lithology
- Primary: Shale, mudstone
- Other: Sandstone, siltstone, coal

Location
- Region: Montana, Wyoming
- Country: United States

Type section
- Named for: Lebo creek, Montana

The Lebo Member is a geologic member of the Fort Union Formation in Montana and Wyoming. It preserves fossils dating back to the Paleogene period.

== See also ==
- List of fossiliferous stratigraphic units in Montana
- Paleontology in Montana
