= Three Forks Shale =

Geologic formation in Montana and North Dakota, United States

- Stratigraphic range: Devonian
- Type: Formation

Location
- Region: Montana
- Country: United States

The Three Forks Shale is a geologic formation in Montana and North Dakota. It preserves fossils dating back to the Devonian period.

== See also ==
- List of fossiliferous stratigraphic units in Montana
- Paleontology in Montana
