= Shell Creek Shale =

Geologic formation in Montana

- Stratigraphic range: Cretaceous
- Type: Formation

Location
- Region: Montana
- Country: United States

The Shell Creek Shale is a geologic formation in Montana. It preserves fossils dating back to the Cretaceous period.

== See also ==
- List of fossiliferous stratigraphic units in Montana
- Paleontology in Montana
