= Piksi =

Piksi Temporal range: Late Cretaceous, 75 Ma

Scientific classification
- Kingdom: Animalia
- Phylum: Chordata
- Class: Reptilia
- Order: †Pterosauria
- Suborder: †Pterodactyloidea
- Genus: †Piksi; Varricchio, 2002
- Species: †P. barbarulna

Binomial name
- †Piksi barbarulna Varricchio, 2002

Potential genus of ornithocheiroid pterosaur from the Late Cretaceous

Piksi is a potential pterosaur genus containing the single species Piksi barbarulna (meaning "strange elbowed big bird", from Blackfoot piksi, "big bird" or, specifically, "chicken" and Latin barbarus "strange, outlandish" + ulna, elbow). It lived roughly 75 million years ago in what is now Montana, United States. Known from parts of a right wing – the humerus, ulna and radius bones – the only specimens found so far are housed in the Museum of the Rockies (collection number MOR 1113). The genus Piksi is monotypic at present.

The fossils were found in 1991 by Gloria Jean Siebrecht in the Blackfeet Indian Reservation, namely at Bob's Vacation Site locality TM-088, Glacier County. Recovered from an old stratum of the upper Two Medicine Formation, they are probably from an individual that died in or near a small pool. It was described in 2002 by David J. Varricchio.

== Description and classification ==
The bones are fragmentary and represent roughly the elbow area. Comparing the fossils' size to the wing bones of other ground birds, P. barbarulna would have been relatively small, with a wingspan reaching 1 m (3.3 ft).

The original description of the fossils found its affinities unresolvable except that it was probably an ornithothoracine bird. Agnolin and Varricchio (2012) reinterpreted Piksi barbarulna as a pterosaur rather than a bird, most likely a member of Ornithocheiroidea. However, it has since been noted that the humerus of Piksi possesses features which found in some theropods but not in any pterodactyloid pterosaurs.

However, more recent studies have recovered it as a pterosaur again, citing eight features supporting referral to Pterosauria, and three that are "potentially informative with respect to Piksi's placement in Pterosauria", suggesting affinities for Pteranodontoidea.

== Ecology ==
The deposit in which the bones were found was a silty claystone. This was formed from sediments deposited during what seems to have been a rather cool phase of the Late Cretaceous: sea levels of the Western Interior Seaway at least were apparently very low for Mesozoic standards, though this may also have been due to strong tectonic uplift in the Cordilleran Overthrust Belt. The location was inland, with the Western Interior Seaway's coast at least 350 km (220 miles) away.

Judging from the stratigraphical, sedimentological and faunal data, the environment was thus probably semi-humid, possibly (seasonally?) semi-arid grassland or shrubland in a tropical or subtropical climate. The claystone apparently formed from sediment of a small floodplain, such as an ephemeral pool.

A diverse fauna utilized the location as a habitat. Other theropods were plentiful, including Troodon (the nest of which was recovered), tyrannosaurids, and dromaeosaurids. Orodromeus was also abundant; herds might have come to the pool to drink or breed, as adults, juveniles and hatchlings were found together. Early mammals – metatherians and multituberculates – occurred in the area, as well as lizards. That there was a temporary though not permanent body of water is indicated by the presence of articulated frog skeletons and the absence of fish and other aquatic animals.

== See also ==
- List of pterosaur genera
- Timeline of pterosaur research

== Sources ==
- Senter, Phil (2006): Scapular orientation in theropods and basal birds, and the origin of flapping flight. Acta Palaeontologica Polonica 51(2): 305–313. PDF fulltext
- Snow, David W.; Perrins, Christopher M.; Doherty, Paul & Cramp, Stanley (1998): The complete birds of the western Palaearctic on CD-ROM. Oxford University Press. ISBN 0-19-268579-1
- Varricchio, David J (2002). "A new bird from the Upper Cretaceous Two Medicine Formation of Montana". Canadian Journal of Earth Sciences. 39 (1): 19–26. doi:10.1139/e01-057.
