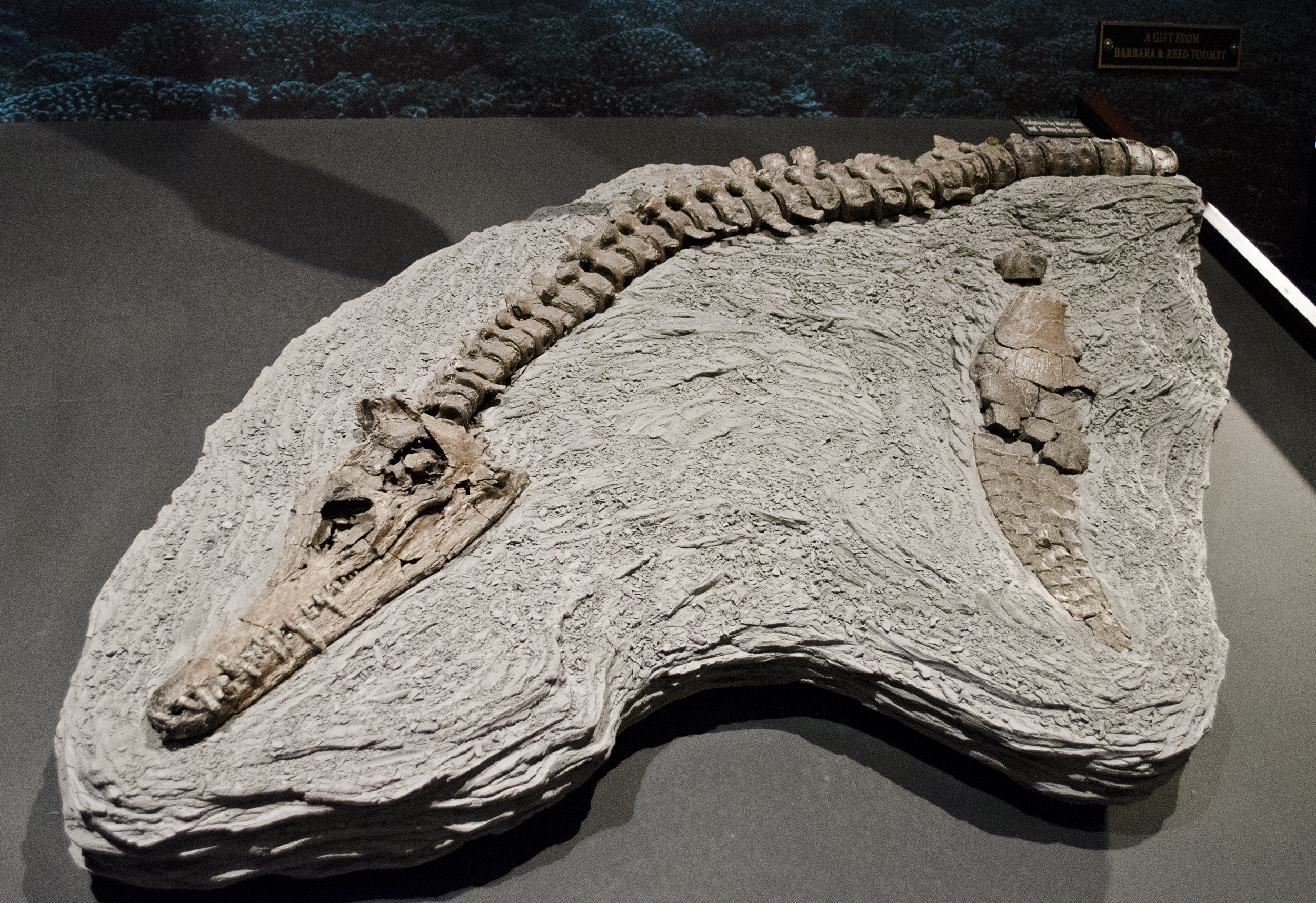
- Type specimen of Edgarosaurus muddi on display in the Museum of the Rockies

Scientific classification
- Domain: Eukaryota
- Kingdom: Animalia
- Phylum: Chordata
- Class: Reptilia
- Superorder: †Sauropterygia
- Order: †Plesiosauria
- Family: †Polycotylidae
- Genus: †Edgarosaurus; Druckenmiller, 2002
- Species: †E. muddi

Binomial name
- †Edgarosaurus muddi Druckenmiller, 2002

= Edgarosaurus =

Edgarosaurus Temporal range: Early Cretaceous, Albian

Extinct genus of reptiles

Edgarosaurus is a genus of polycotylid plesiosaur from the Thermopolis Shale, containing one species, E. muddi. The type specimen was found in Early Cretaceous (late Albian) rocks in the state of Montana in the United States. At the time, this location was covered by part of the Western Interior Seaway. Edgarosaurus was one of the first polycotylids that evolved to become native to the Western Interior Seaway.

The holotype (which is currently the only known specimen) consists of the skull, neck, parts of the spine and the left front flipper.

== History of study ==
The well-preserved holotype specimen of Edgarosaurus (MOR 751) was found in the Shell Creek Member, the uppermost of the three members of the Thermopolis Shale, during the spring of 1993. The specimen's skull is complete and was preserved in articulation with a series 25 cervical (neck) vertebrae. An additional cervical vertebra, three pectoral (shoulder) vertebrae, and two dorsal (back) vertebrae were found isolated at the site, but articulate to form a series with the other 25 cervical vertebrae. Three other dorsal vertebrae were also recovered, though they do not seem to belong to this string of vertebrae. An almost complete front paddle is also known. Edgarosaurus muddi was named in 2002 by Pat S. Druckenmiller. The generic name refers to the nearby location of Edgar, Montana, while the specific name honors Kevin Mudd.

== Description ==
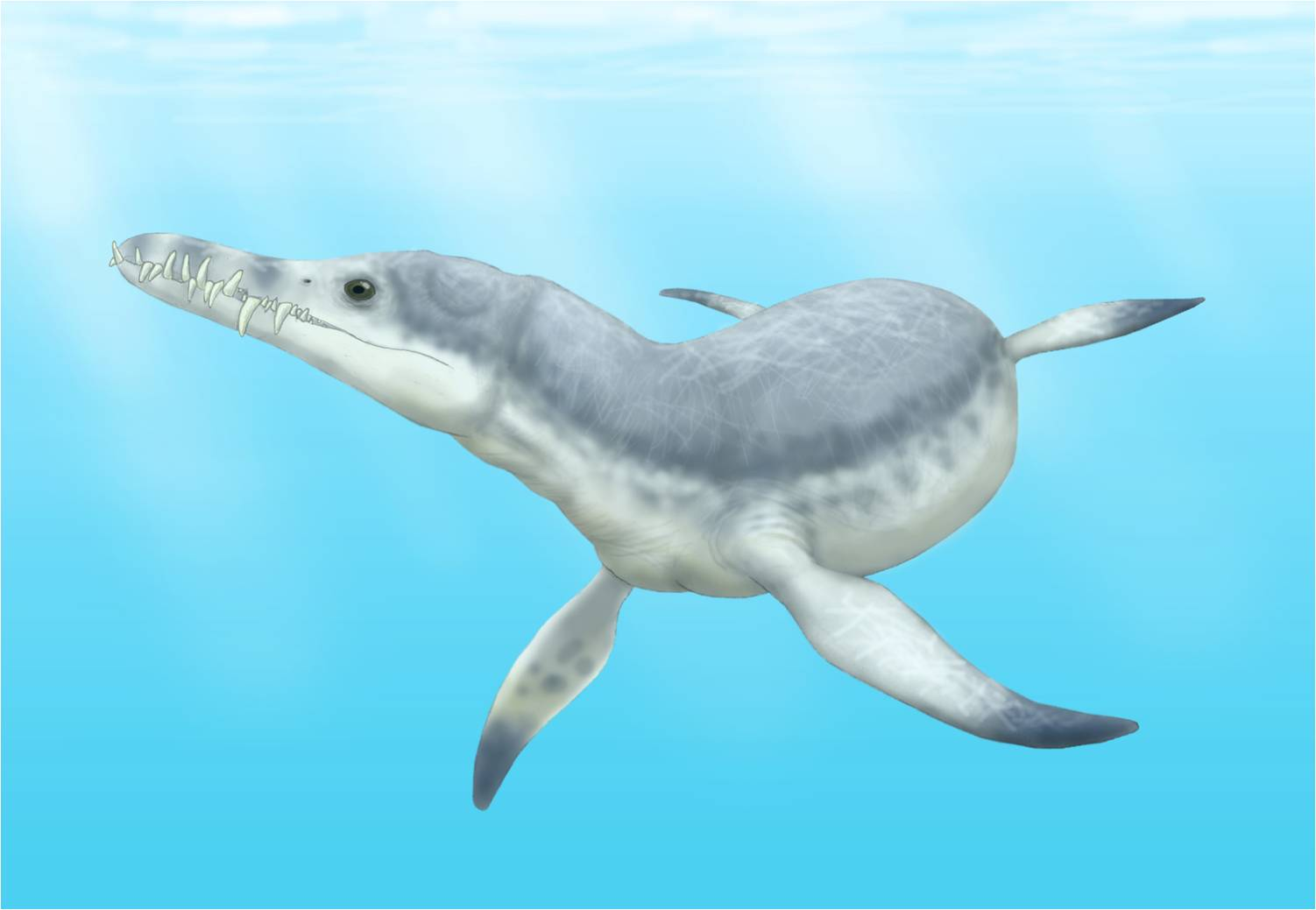
Life restoration

Druckenmiller estimated the total length of Edgarosaurus to be roughly 3.2–3.7 meters (10–12 ft), a figure derived from the proportions of Dolichorhynchops and Peloneustes. The cranium of the holotype specimen of Edgarosaurus is 47.5 centimetres (1.56 ft) long. Each premaxilla (front upper tooth bearing bone) contains either six or seven teeth. The top of skull of Edgarosaurus possesses a small opening towards its back known as a pineal foramen. The back of the skull is vertical, rather than sloping. Each side of the braincase is perforated by a circular hole. The front ends of each half of the mandible are fused together to form a mandibular symphysis. There are six tooth pairs situated on the symphysis, a low number for a polycotylid. Edgarosaurus has large, fang-like teeth.

The neck of Edgarosaurus is short for a plesiosaur, containing a total of 26 vertebrae. The neck and skull together were estimated by Druckenmiller to comprise up to 45% of the animal's length. The lower arm bones of Edgarosaurus are very short and wide. The first digit of its forelimb consists of seven bones, the second eleven, and the third ten, while the fourth and fifth bear nine.

== See also ==
- List of plesiosaur genera
- Timeline of plesiosaur research
