= Cameron Creek (Alberta) =

Stream in Alberta, Canada

Coordinates: 56.6835°N 111.40189°W

Cameron Creek is a stream in Alberta, Canada. Cameron Creek is named after D. R. Cameron, a government surveyor.

== See also ==
- List of rivers of Alberta
