= Gloria Jean Siebrecht =

American paleontologist (1940–2021)

Gloria Siebrecht
- Born: Gloria Schnee; December 27, 1940; Kalispell, Montana, United States
- Died: November 14, 2021 (aged 80); Seattle, Washington, United States
- Known for: Amateur paleontologist
- Spouse: Odell Siebrecht (m. 1959)
- Children: 2
- Parent(s): James Schnee; Marie Rite

Gloria Jean Siebrecht (December 27, 1940 – November 14, 2021) was an American amateur paleontologist and volunteer for the Museum of the Rockies, notable as the discoverer of Avisaurus Gloriae, which was named for her, and Piksi barbarulna.

She was the sixth child of James Baily Schnee and Marie Van De Rite of Kalispell, Montana. She grew up in Columbia Falls, Montana; McMinnville, Oregon; and Lincoln City, Oregon. She graduated from Taft High School in Lincoln City in 1958. She married Odell Siebrecht in 1959 and raised two children on a farm north of Cut Bank, Montana.

As a volunteer for the Museum of the Rockies, Siebrecht spent thousands of hours on digs and in preparing fossils for display. Gloria died in Seattle on November 14, 2021 after surgery for an aneurism.
