= Virgelle Sandstone =

Geologic formation in Montana, United States

- Type: Geological formation
- Underlies: Two Medicine Formation

Lithology
- Primary: Sandstone

Location
- Region: Montana
- Country: United States

The Virgelle Sandstone is a geologic formation overlain by the Two Medicine Formation. It formed from the beach sands exposed on northern and western shores of the receding Colorado Sea.
