= Two Medicine Formation =

Geological formation in Montana, United States and Alberta, Canada

- Stratigraphic range: Campanian; ~82.4–74.4 Ma
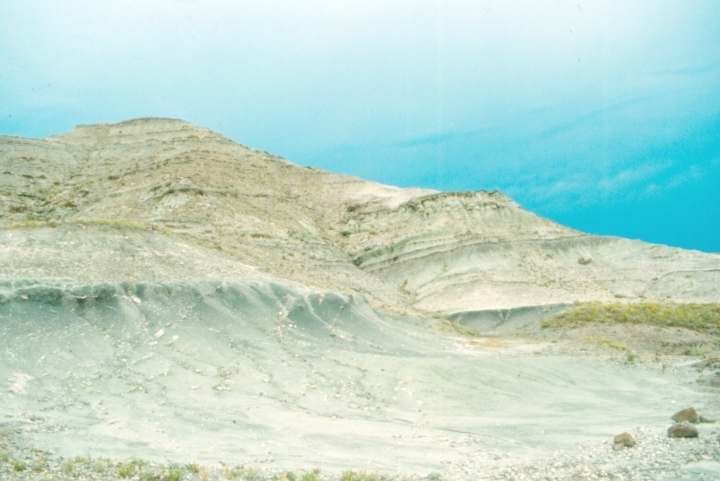
- Outcrop of the Two Medicine Formation near "Egg Mountain" in northern Montana
- Type: Geological formation
- Sub-units: Rock City Member, Shields Crossing Member, Hagans Crossing Member, Flag Butte Member
- Underlies: Bearpaw Shale
- Overlies: Virgelle Sandstone
- Thickness: 600 m (2,000 ft) (western portion)

Lithology
- Primary: Sandstone

Location
- Coordinates: 48°04′27″N 112°17′58″W
- Approximate paleocoordinates: 55.3°N 77.8°W
- Region: Montana, Alberta
- Country: United States, Canada

Type section
- Named for: Two Medicine River
- Named by: Stebinger
- Year defined: 1914
- Two Medicine Formation (the United States) Two Medicine Formation (Montana)

The Two Medicine Formation is a geological formation, or rock body, in northwestern Montana and southern Alberta that was deposited between 82.4 Ma and 74.4 Ma, during Campanian (Late Cretaceous) time. It crops out to the east of the Rocky Mountain Overthrust Belt, and the western portion (about 600 metres or 2,000 feet thick) of this formation is folded and faulted while the eastern part, which thins out into the Sweetgrass Arch, is mostly undeformed plains. Below the formation are the nearshore (beach and tidal zone) deposits of the Virgelle Sandstone, and above it is the marine Bearpaw Shale. Throughout the Campanian, the Two Medicine Formation was deposited between the western shoreline of the Late Cretaceous Interior Seaway and the eastward advancing margin of the Cordilleran Overthrust Belt. The Two Medicine Formation is mostly sandstone, deposited by rivers and deltas.

== History of research ==
In 1913, a US Geological Survey crew headed by Eugene Stebinger and a US National Museum crew headed by Charles Gilmore worked together to excavate the first dinosaur of the formation. Stebinger was the first to identify the Two Medicine Formation and formally described the first fossils in a scientific paper published in 1914. Gilmore returned to the Formation in 1928 and 1935. During this time frame only three species were named and of these only Styracosaurus ovatus and Edmontonia rugosidens are still regarded as valid. Barnum Brown prospected the formation in 1933, but found nothing significant. Both of their research were interrupted by World War II. In 1977, David Trexler reports finding hadrosaur remains west of Choteau, Montana. During the next year baby hadrosaurs were discovered. In 1979, Horner and Makela referred these hadrosaur bones to Maiasaura peeblesorum. The announcement attracted renewed scientific interest to the formation and many new kinds of dinosaurs were discovered. More nesting sites were discovered later, including the Devil's Coulee site yielding Hypacrosaurus stebingeri in southern Alberta in 1987.

== Geology ==
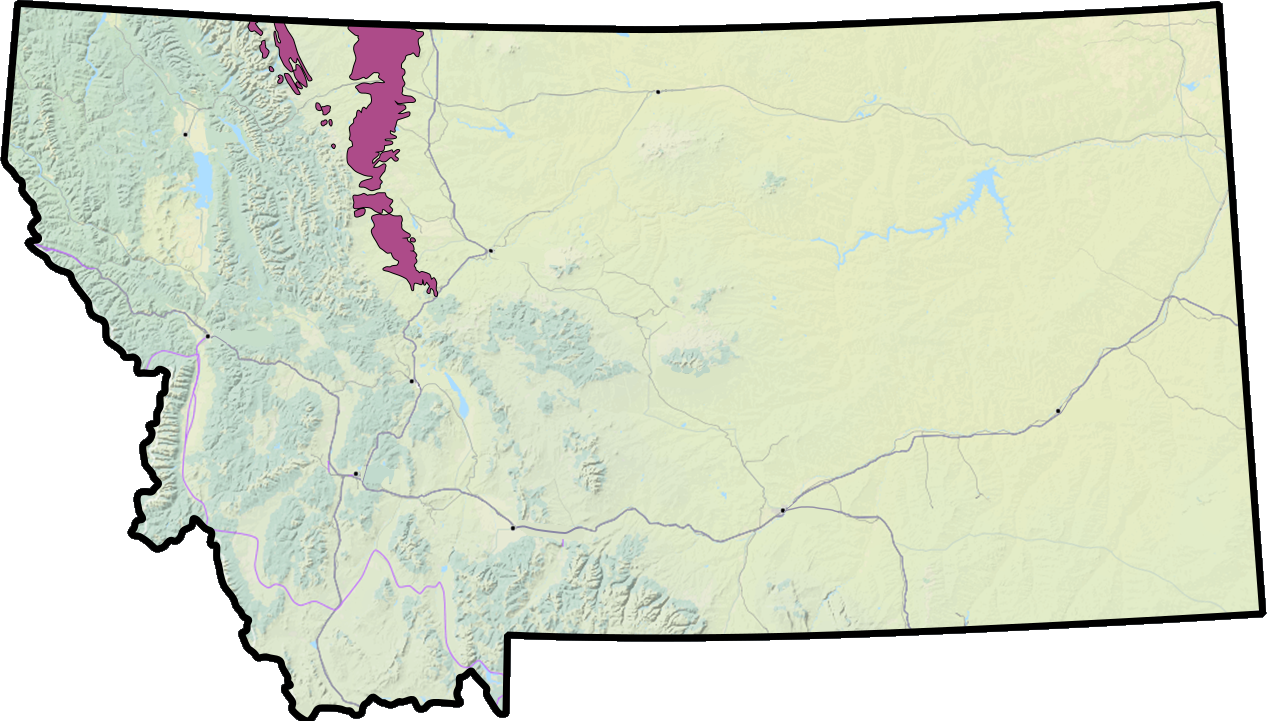
A map of the surface exposures of the Two Medicine Formation from the USGS with the map courtesy of OpenStreetMap

The loosely consolidated fine grain sediments composing the formation allow for fast plant growth in badland areas, limiting the number of exposed outcrops. Paleosols, fluvial deposits and bentonitic layers are common in the Two Medicine Formation.

=== Age ===
The Two Medicine Formation spans from 82.4 to 74.4 Ma, nearly the entire length of the Campanian stage. The age of the different members of the formation are as follows:

- Rock City Member: 82.4-80.8 Ma
- Shields Crossing Member: 80.8-80.2 Ma
- Hagans Crossing Member: 80.2-77 Ma
- Flag Butte Member: 77-74.8 Ma

=== Equivalents ===
There are several equivalents to the Two Medicine Formation, as with many geologic formations (most of which are named after their type locality). The Sweetgrass Arch in Montana divides the Two Medicine from the Judith River Formation, Bearpaw Shale, Claggett Shale, and Eagle Sandstone. Across the Canada–United States border, the Two Medicine Formation correlates to the Belly River Group in southwest Alberta, and the Pakowki Formation eastward.

=== Stratigraphy ===
The Two Medicine overlies the Virgelle Sandstone, which formed from the beach sands exposed on northern and western shores of the receding Colorado Sea. A Cretaceous Interior Seaway transgression submerged the area briefly early on in Two Medicine history leaving anomalous paralic sediments and isolated shale bodies about 100 m above the base of the formation. The Middle portion of the two medicine formation is about 225 m thick, deposited while the Clagette Sea was receding and the Bearpaw Sea transgressing. This portion is stratigraphically equivalent to the Judith River Formation and Judith River Group. The sediments are mainly bentonitic siltstones and mudstones with "occasional sandstone lenses." These sediments are thought to be the remains of a coastal plain "far removed" from the interior sea. The upper portion is about one half of the formation. Its sediments are similar to the middle portions but punctuated by extensive red beds and caliche horizons. The uppermost 80 m were deposited after the inundation of the Judith River equivalent sediments by the Bearpaw Sea. They are thought to have been deposited in only 500,000 years. Bentonitic ash is common in the Two Medicine. To the south extrusive volcanic activity occurred in association with the Boulder Batholith collectively called the Elkhorn Volcanics.

=== Taphonomy ===
Most of the vertebrate fossils are preserved by CaCo_{3} permineralization. This type of preservation preserves high levels of detail, even down to the microscopic level. However, it also leaves specimens vulnerable to weathering when exposed to the surface.

== Paleoenvironment ==
=== Climate ===
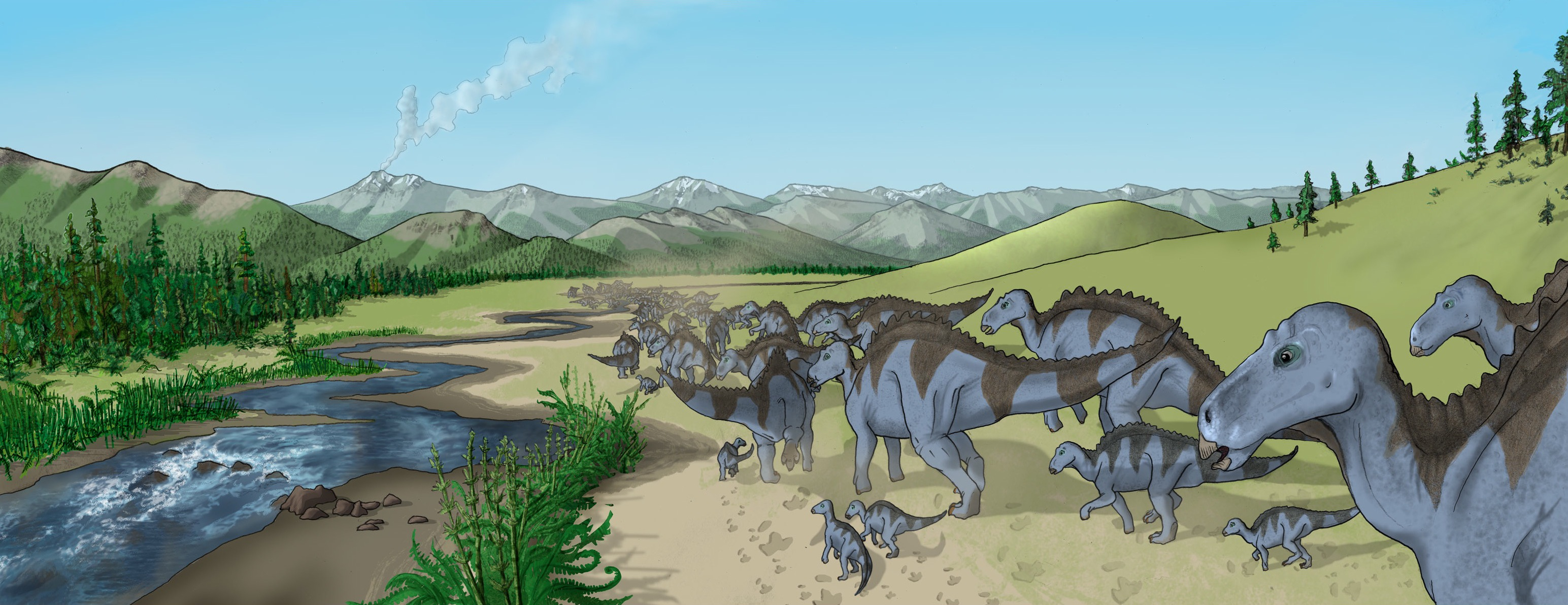
Reconstruction image of a herd of Maiasaura walking along a creek-bed in Two Medicine Formation. Shown are the region's typical conifer, fern and horsetail vegetation, and a volcano erupting in the distance is evocative of the ash layers found in the Two Medicine Formation.

The Two Medicine Formation was deposited in a seasonal, semi-arid climate with possible rainshadows from the Cordilleran highlands. This region during the Campanian experienced a long dry season and warm temperatures. Lithologies, invertebrate faunas, and plant and pollen data support the above interpretation. The extensive red beds and caliche horizons of the upper Two Medicine are evidence of at least seasonally arid conditions. Some of the dinosaurs from the formation have been speculated to have shown signs of drought-related death.

=== Elevation ===
A more upland environment existed in the south of the Two Medicine Formation. Streams had a northeasterly flow away from these southwestern uplands. The southern part of the Two medicine formation grades into brackish water siltstone/sandstone series called the Horsethief Formation. The sediments of the Horsethief represent shallower water deposits than the Bearpaw Shale adding further evidence of higher elevation areas existing in the south.

== Egg Mountain site ==
Egg Mountain, which is near Choteau, Montana, was discovered in 1977 by Marion Brandvold, owner of the Trex Agate Rock Shop in Bynum, Montana, who discovered the bones of juvenile dinosaurs at this site. It is a colonial nesting site on the Willow Creek Anticline in the Two Medicine Formation that is famous for its fossil eggs of Maiasaura, which demonstrated for the first time that at least some dinosaurs cared for their young. The eggs were arranged in dug-out earthen nests, each nest about a parent's body length from the next, and baby dinosaurs were also found with skeletons too cartilaginous for them to walk - similar to those of altricial (helpless) baby birds. The parent(s) must then have brought food to the young, and there is plant matter in the nests that may be evidence of either this or for incubation of the eggs. Maiasaura also grew extremely fast, at rates comparable to modern birds. Skeletons of Orodromeus and skeletons and eggs of Troodon were also found at Egg Mountain.

== Biostratigraphy ==
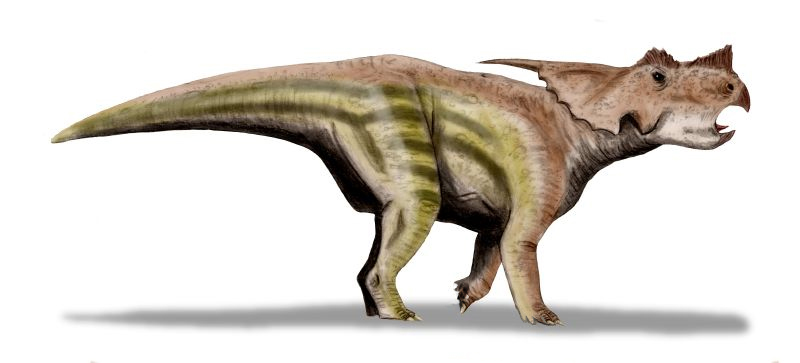
Achelousaurus

Most dinosaur-bearing rock formations do not contain multiple distinct faunas at different positions within the formation's stratigraphic column. Usually the lower sediments of a given formation will contain the same kinds of dinosaurs as the upper sediments, or the species composition changes only gradually. However, some researchers had argued that the Two Medicine Formation was an exception, preserving multiple distinct dinosaur faunas.

Later research came to find that the supposedly distinct dinosaur faunas at different levels of the formations were more similar than had been previously thought. While the dinosaur fauna of the lower and middle sections Two Medicine was apparently diverse, the quality of preservation was low and few of these remains can be referred to individual species. The middle Two Medicine is a better source of fossils, but still poor overall. This makes it difficult to argue that these sections of the formation preserve distinct faunas.

The upper portion of the formation is more diverse and preserves better quality fossils. However, many of the taxa that supposedly distinguished it as a separate fauna have since been found in older sediments. In particular, Gryposaurus latidens and Hypacrosaurus have been found to coexist with Maiasaura. Further, there are fossil teeth that seem to show the presence of certain taxa are unbroken throughout the whole formation.

Nevertheless, some true changes in faunal composition seem to occur in the upper Two Medicine. The appearance of Maiasaura in the formation precedes the arrival of a diverse variety of other ornithischians. According to David Trexler, thorough examination of strata found along the Two Medicine River (which exposes the entire upper half of the Two Medicine Formation) indicates that the apparent diversification was a real event rather than a result of preservational biases.

The timeline below follows the stratigraphic chart presented by Horner et al. 2001.

== Dinosaurs ==
Some of the dinosaurs from the formation have been speculated to show signs of drought related death. Very few articulated dinosaurs have been found in the formation; most specimens are isolated, bone bed, poorly preserved or broken remains. Early studies assumed that the Two Medicine Formation would have the same dinosaurs as the Judith River Formation. It was only in 1978, that it was discovered that the formation had endemic dinosaurs. Even some genera regarded as wide-ranging predators exhibited a species difference between the Two Medicine and other formations. No ecological barriers have been postulated apart from upland/lowland habitat preference differences between the Two Medicine and Judith River Formation. There is no unequivocal evidence for intermingling between the wildlife of the Two Medicine and geographically adjacent contemporary formations. Dinosaur remains are more common in the upper part of the Two Medicine.

Color key: Taxon / Reclassified taxon / Taxon falsely reported as present / Dubious taxon or junior synonym / Ichnotaxon / Ootaxon / Morphotaxon

Notes
Uncertain or tentative taxa are in small text
~~crossed out~~ taxa are discredited.

=== Ankylosaurs ===
Ankylosaurs of the Two Medicine Formation
Genus	Species	Location	Stratigraphic position	Material	Notes	Images
Edmontonia	E. rugosidens	Landslide Butte; Two Medicine River	Flag Butte Member	A skull with right mandible, cervical vertebrae, dorsal vertebrae, sacral vertebrae, caudal vertebrae, ribs, partial right ilium, left and right ischia, right pubis and osteoderms.	A nodosaurid also known from the Horseshoe Canyon Formation and Dinosaur Park Formation.	
Euoplocephalus	E. tutus		Flag Butte Member		Misclassified, actually represent Scolosaurus	
Euoplocephalus	Indeterminate	Landslide Butte; Two Medicine River	Flag Butte Member		Misclassified, probably Scolosaurus	
Oohkotokia	O. horneri		Flag Butte Member	[Four] skulls, cervical vertebra, proximal caudal vertebra, ribs partial scapula, distal humerus, a left scapulocoracoid, ischia, [two] tail clubs, cervical half-ring, osteoderms, fragments and an undescribed specimen.	Penkalski (2013) referred to Oohkotokia all ankylosaurine specimens from this formation. Arbour and Currie (2013) later referred Oohkotokia to Scolosaurus.	
Scolosaurus	S. cutleri		Flag Butte Member	[Four] skulls, cervical vertebra, proximal caudal vertebra, ribs partial scapula, distal humerus, a left scapulocoracoid, ischia, [two] tail clubs, cervical half-ring, osteoderms, fragments and an undescribed specimen.	An ankylosaurine ankylosaurid. These remains were previously considered to represent Euoplocephalus and then referred to Oohkotokia before being placed in Scolosaurus.	

=== Avialans ===
Avialans of the Two Medicine Formation
Genus	Species	Location	Stratigraphic position	Material	Notes	Images
Gettyia	G. gloriae		Upper	"Tarsometatarsus"	An avisaurid enantiornithean	

=== Marginocephalians ===
Marginocephalians of the Two Medicine Formation
Genus	Species	Location	Stratigraphic position	Material	Notes	Images
Achelousaurus	A. horneri	Landslide Butte	Upper Flag Butte Member	"[Three] partial skulls, [one] partial skeleton."	A centrosaurine ceratopsid	
Brachyceratops	B. montanensis		Flag Butte Member	"[Six] partial skulls, skeletons, subadult."	A centrosaurine ceratopsid. Might be a juvenile Styracosaurus	
Brontotholus	B. harmoni			Skull domes.	A pachycephalosaurid	
Cerasinops	C. hodgskissi		Lower Hagans Crossing Member		A leptoceratopsid	
Einiosaurus	E. procurvicornis	Landslide Butte	Upper Flag Butte Member	"[Three] adult skulls, juvenile and subadult cranial and postcranial elements."	A centrosaurine ceratopsid	
Prenoceratops	P. pieganensis		Upper Flag Butte Member		A leptoceratopsid	
Stellasaurus	S. ancellae	Landslide Butte	Flag Butte Member	"Nasal horn and fragmentary parietal frill."	A centrosaurine ceratopsid	
Styracosaurus	S. ovatus		Flag Butte Member	Fragmentary parietal frill.	A centrosaurine ceratopsid	

=== Non-avialan eumaniraptorans ===
Non-avialan eumaniraptorans of the Two Medicine Formation
Genus	Species	Location	Stratigraphic position	Material	Notes	Images
Bambiraptor	B. feinbergi		Flag Butte Member	"Almost complete skull and postcrania," type specimen	A saurornitholestine dromaeosaur	
Dromaeosaurus	Indeterminate		Hagans Crossing Member			
Dromaeosauridae	gen. et sp. nov.	Glacier County			On display at the Museum of the Rockies	The mount of MOR 660
Richardoestesia	Indeterminate		Flag Butte Member	Teeth		
Saurornitholestes	Indeterminate	"Choteau/Bynum"; Landslide Butte; Two Medicine River	Flag Butte Member; Hagans Crossing Member	Partial skeleton, isolated pedal elements	A saurornitholestine dromaeosaur	
Troodon	T. formosus?		Flag Butte Member	Partial skulls, several vertebrae, ribs, gastralia, chevrons, a sacrum, partial pelvis, and partial fore and hind limbs	The remains are controversial, typically assigned to Troodon, but later studies suggested that the genus may be dubious. However, it has been proposed that these remains do indeed belong to Troodon formosus, and that one specimen should probably serve as the neotype	The Troodon mount at the Museum of the Rockies, containing material from MOR and Royal Tyrell Museum of Paleontology specimens

=== Ornithopods ===
An unidentified lambeosaurine has been collected from the same stratigraphic placement, west of Bynum, and is in preparation at The Montana Dinosaur Center

Ornithopods and parksosaurs of the Two Medicine Formation
Genus	Species	Location	Stratigraphic position	Material	Notes	Images
Acristavus	A. gagslarsoni		Lower Hagans Crossing Member		A saurolophine hadrosaur	The skull of the holotype
Corythosaurus	C. stebingeri		Flag Butte Member		A lambeosaurine hadrosaur.	The holotype skull
Glishades	G. ericksoni				A hadrosauroid or an indeterminate juvenile saurolophine hadrosaur.	
Gryposaurus	G. latidens	Two Medicine River	Lower Hagans Crossing Member	"Several partial skulls and postcranial skeletons." Also known from isolated teeth which may have been redeposited fossils, although this explanation is unlikely.	A saurolophine hadrosaur. The isolated G. latidens teeth are a rare component of channel lag deposits in the middle portion of the formation.	
Gryposaurus	Indeterminate		Flag Butte Member			
Maiasaura	M. peeblesorum	"Choteau/Bynum"; Two Medicine River	Upper Hagans Crossing Member	"More than [two hundred] specimens including articulated skull and postcrania, embryo to adult."	A saurolophine hadrosaur. Choteau Maiasaura remains are found in higher strata than their Two Medicine River counterparts. It is the most common dinosaur found in the Egg Mountain locality.	A skeleton of Maiasaura
Orodromeus	O. makelai	"Choteau/Bynum"	Lacustrine Interval, Lower Flag Butte Member		An orodromine thescelosaur which was the most common small herbivore in the Egg Mountain area.	
Prosaurolophus	P. maximus	Landslide Butte; Two Medicine River	Upper Flag Butte Member	"Disarticulated, associated skull and postcrania pertaining to at least [four] individuals."	A saurolophine hadrosaur. Prosaurolophus blackfeetensis, erected for Two Medicine fossils, is a synonym of P. maximus.	

=== Oviraptorosaurs ===
The first find of an oviraptorosaur in Montana was an articular region from the lower jaw of Caenagnathus sternbergi, from the Two Medicine Formation, according to a 2001 paper by David J. Varrichio. This species had previously only been known from the Canadian province of Alberta. Varricchio observes that during the late Campanian, Alberta and Montana had very similar theropods despite significant differences in the types of herbivorous dinosaur faunas.

Oviraptorosaurs of the Two Medicine Formation
Genus	Species	Location	Stratigraphic position	Material	Notes	Images
Chirostenotes	C. pergracilis			Known from the articular region of a lower jaw, catalogued as MOR 1107	Was previously referred to Caenagnathus sternbergi (a synonym of Chirostenotes)	

=== Tyrannosauroids ===
Tyrannosauroids of the Two Medicine Formation
Genus	Species	Location	Stratigraphic position	Material	Notes	Images
Daspletosaurus	D. horneri		Flag Butte Member	Bonebed		
Daspletosaurus	D. wilsoni		Flag Butte Member	Bonebed		
Albertosaurinae	Indeterminate	"Choteau/Bynum"	Flag Butte Member		Includes TCM 2001.89.1., the undescribed skeleton	
Teratophoneini	Indeterminate			Frontal	Phylogenetic analysis recovers it in Teratophoneini	
Tyrannosaurus	T. sp.		Flag Butte Member	right lacrimal, isolated tooth	More similar to Tyrannosaurini than other Campanian tyrannosaurids	

== Other fauna ==
Many other fossil animals have been found, such as freshwater bivalves, gastropods, turtles, lizards such as Magnuviator, and champsosaurs. The multituberculate mammal Cimexomys has been found on Egg Mountain. The species Piksi barbarulna was described based on forelimb bones from the Two Medicine Formation; it was initially thought to be a bird, but subsequently it was reinterpreted as a pterosaur, likely a member of Ornithocheiroidea. Azhdarchoid pterosaurs are also known from the Two Medicine Formation, including a very large, yet-unnamed azhdarchid, the estimated wingspan of which was 8 metres (26 ft), and smaller Montanazhdarcho minor, a non-azhdarchid azhdarchoid. Insect and mammal burrows have also been discovered, as well as dinosaur coprolites.

== See also ==
- List of dinosaur-bearing rock formations
- List of fossil sites (with link directory)
