= Paleontology in Montana =

Paleontological research in the U.S. state of Montana

The location of the state of Montana

Paleontology in Montana refers to paleontological research occurring within or conducted by people from the U.S. state of Montana. The fossil record in Montana stretches all the way out to sea where local bacteria formed stromatolites and bottom-dwelling marine life left tracks on the sediment that would later fossilize. This sea remained in place during the early Paleozoic, although withdrew during the Silurian and Early Devonian, leaving a gap in the local rock record until its return. This sea was home to creatures including brachiopods, conodonts, crinoids, fish, and trilobites. During the Carboniferous the state was home to an unusual cartilaginous fish fauna. Later in the Paleozoic the sea began to withdraw, but with a brief return during the Permian.

During the Triassic Montana was again covered in a sea whose inhabitants are the state's only known fossils from this time. Much of Montana remained covered by seawater into the Late Jurassic, but exposed areas were greened by a flora of conifers, cycads, ferns, and ginkgoes. This coastal plain was home to dinosaurs including the ornithopod Camptosaurus, the sauropods Apatosaurus and Diplodocus, and the theropod Allosaurus. During the early Cretaceous the state was home to its first flowering plants as well as predators such as Deinonychus. Later the Western Interior Seaway, home to creatures such as mosasaurs and plesiosaurs, came to cover the state. On land, the duckbilled Maiasaura formed vast nesting colonies. By the end of the Cretaceous Montana was home to some of the most famous dinosaurs; creatures such as Edmontosaurus, Triceratops, and Tyrannosaurus.

During the early Cenozoic the sea began to withdraw from the state. Plants, insects, and titanotheres are preserved from this time. Later inhabitants would include arctocyonids, insectivores, multituberculates, pantodonts, primates, and taeniodonts. As the Cenozoic proceeded the climate cooled until the Ice Age started and glaciers entered the state. At this time mammoths, musk oxen, and dire wolves lived in the areas of the state not covered by glaciers. Local Native Americans have been devising mythical explanations for fossils and also repurposing them for practical uses for thousands of years. The first scientific collection of local fossils began in the mid 19th century. Other important discoveries include the plant and insect fossils of Ruby Valley and Deinonychus, which triggered the dinosaur renaissance. The Cretaceous Duck-billed dinosaur Maiasaura peeblesorum is the Montana state fossil.

== Prehistory ==
The fossil record in Montana stretches all the way back to the Precambrian. During the Late Precambrian, western Montana was covered by a warm, shallow sea. This sea was home to stromatolites and to bottom-dwelling marine life whose tracks on the benthic sediment would later fossilize. Montanan life of the time included arthropods, blue-green algae, conularians, fungi, and worms. Their fossils were preserved in what are now known as Glacier National Park. The worms left trace fossils such as burrow fillings and trails through the sediment. During the ensuing Cambrian period the state was still largely covered by sea water. Montana's Cambrian sea was home to algae, invertebrates, and even some of the first known vertebrates. Later, Cambrian trilobites left behind remains in Nixon Gulch, Horseshoe Hills north of Manhattan, Sawtooth-Lewis and Clark ranges west of Augusta, and the Bridger Range north of Bozeman. The sea eventually withdrew from the state and most of Montana's Silurian and Early Devonian sediments were lost to erosion. During the Late Devonian nearly the entire state was again inundated by the sea. Montana's Late Devonian sea was home to brachiopods, conodonts, crinoids, fish, molluscs, and sponges. Seas continued to cover the state into the Carboniferous period. At that time, the state was home to a bewildering array of cartilaginous fishes. Further into the Paleozoic, Mississippian brachiopods, bryozoans, and corals left behind fossils in the Bridger Range and at Shell Mountain south of Big Timber. Later in the Carboniferous, during the Pennsylvanian epoch, the sea began to retreat. Geological uplift was raising the elevation of the northern and northwestern regions of the state. Montana was covered by the sea again for a short interval of the Permian period.

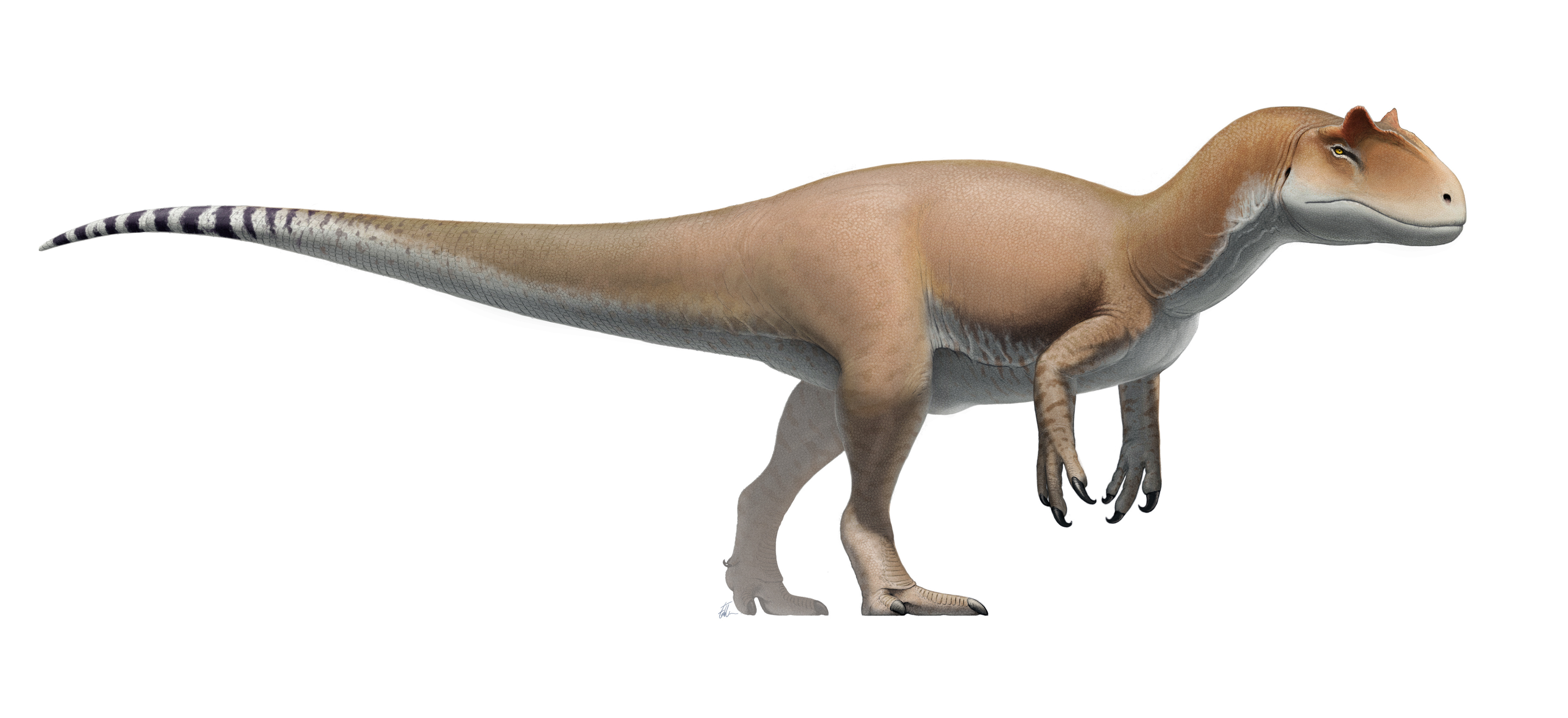
Allosaurus.

During the Early Triassic, Montana was located about thirty degrees of latitude north of the equator. The sea returned twice to cover significant areas of Montana during the ensuing Triassic period. The state's only known contemporary fossils are the remains of this sea's inhabitants. On land Montana was hot and dry. At the time, the far southwesternmost corner of Montana was covered by a small extension of the shallow sea that covered the western coast of North America and stretched into northern Canada. South central Montana, by contrast, was a desert divided by streams. Outside of these regions little is known because sediments were being eroded rather than deposited. During the Jurassic, the sea returned to cover the state. The sea was gradually filled in by sediments eroded away from areas of higher elevation in the western region of the state. During the Late Jurassic, most of Montana was covered in seawater, similar to that which covered the southwestern corner during the Triassic. Ironically, at this point in time the southwestern area of the state contained an island. This sea would have been home to cephalopods, crinoids, ichthyosaurs, and pelecypods. At the time, Montana was located at about 40 degrees Latitude. The state's flora consisted of conifers, cycads, ferns, and ginkgoes. South of Montana's sea was a coastal plain split by streams flowing west from areas of higher elevation to the east. This coastal plain was home to dinosaurs including the ornithopod Camptosaurus, the sauropods Apatosaurus and Diplodocus, and the theropod Allosaurus. These sediments deposited what is now known as the Morrison Formation.

For thirty million years following the deposition of the Morrison Formation sediments in Montana were being eroded rather than deposited. Seawater was still present in Montana, now extending as an embayment down from the Arctic Circle. Rivers were still flowing into the local sea, but the local dinosaur fauna was very different. Carnivores living here included Deinonychus and Microvenator. Herbivores included Sauropelta and Tenontosaurus. Around this time flowering plants would make their first appearance in the state. During the middle part of the Cretaceous Montana was partially covered by the Western Interior Seaway. Significant volcanic eruptions occurred in Montana during the time of the Western Interior Seaway. This sea was home to cephalopods, clams, and plesiosaurs. The sediments deposited by this sea compose what is now called the Colorado Group. No dinosaur fossils are known to have been preserved in the Colorado group in Montana, but outside the state occasional discoveries have been made. Southwestern Montana was dry land, but none of those deposits have yielded dinosaur fossils yet. 85 million years ago the Western Interior Seaway withdrew slightly leaving western Montana as a coastal plain. Dinosaurs were present but rarely left fossilized remains. The sea was home to animals such as cephalopods, gastropods, mosasaurs, pelecypods, and plesiosaurs.

During the Campanian Stage of the Late Cretaceous the coastal plain bordering the Western Interior Seaway was lined with rivers and dotted with a few lakes. These bodies of water deposited the sediments that later became the Two Medicine Formation. Nearby volcanoes were erupting, depositing ash that would later become bentonite. The climate was semiarid. The flora of the coastal plain included conifer forests, deciduous trees, and ferns. A diverse array of dinosaurs lived in Montana at this time. Duckbilled hadrosaurs were common inhabitants of Montana's Campanian coastal plains. Maiasaura is one example. Montana has an especially good fossil record of ceratopsid dinosaurs. Examples of contemporary local ceratopsians include Einiosaurus. The theropods Daspletosaurus and Troodon were also present. Both Maiasaura and Troodon are known to have formed nesting colonies in the area. Late Cretaceous fossil dinosaur footprints are surprisingly rare in Montana compared to other western states with contemporary deposits. This might be due to the local ancient environments not being well suited for track preservation or merely because scientists have not yet looked in the right places.

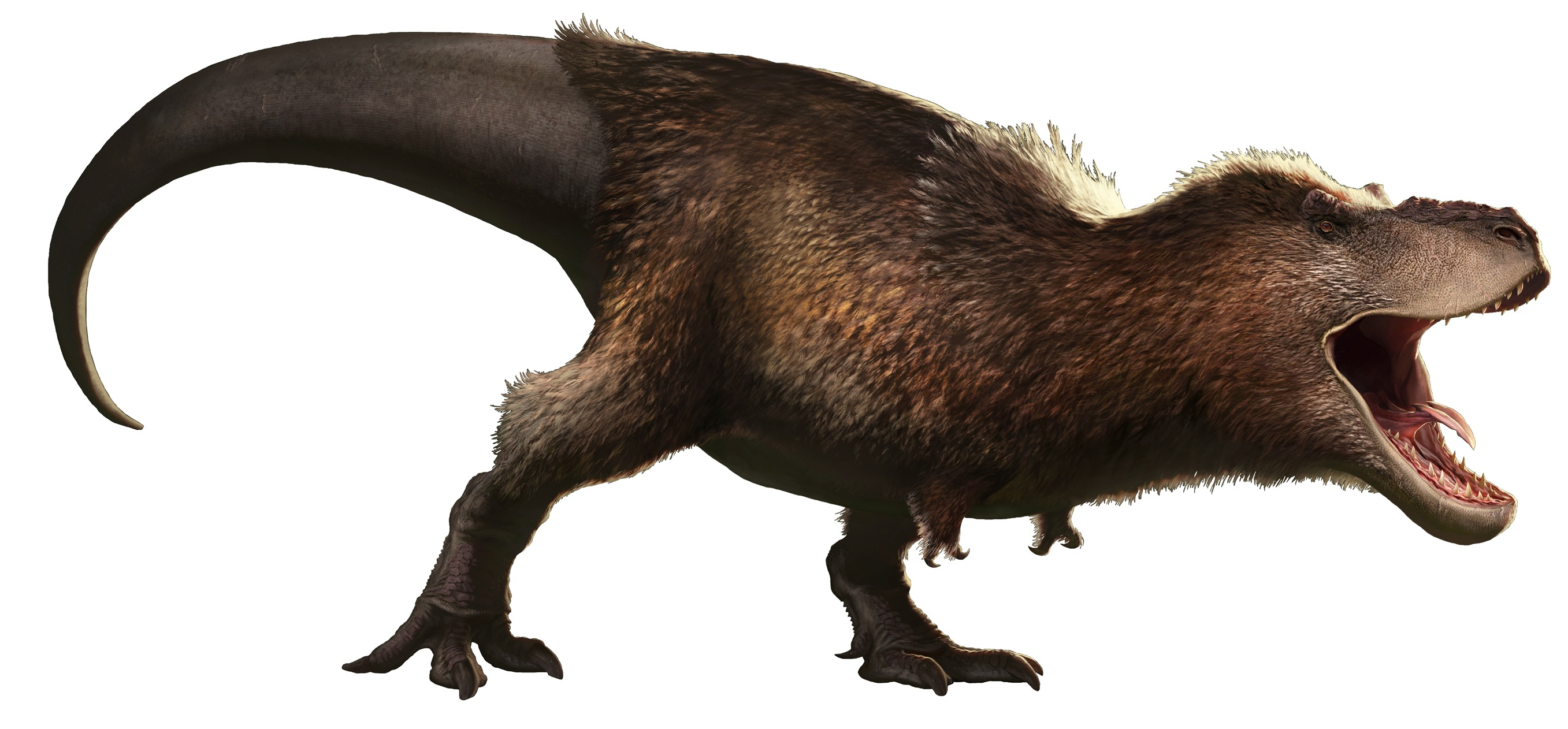
Tyrannosaurus.

Early in the Maastrichtian the Western Interior Seaway expanded its boundaries somewhat. It was home to cephalopods, clams, crustaceans, fishes, gastropods, mosasaurs, and plesiosaurs. Later in the Maastrichtian stage, volcanic activity was still ongoing in the Elkhorn region and the Western Interior Seaway began to withdraw. This regression would end up resulting in both halves of North America reuniting. As the seaway withdrew the area closest to the Rocky Mountains became an expanding desert. Eastern Montana was hot and humid, by contrast, as the coastal plain was also expanding as a result of the marine regression. By the late Maastrichtian stage large rivers flowed across the eastern part of the state, depositing the sediments that would one day become the Hell Creek Formation. At the time, Montana was home to some of the most famous dinosaurs; creatures including Edmontosaurus, Pachycephalosaurus, Triceratops, and Tyrannosaurus.

During the early Cenozoic era, the sea began to retreat from Montana for the last time. Extreme tectonic activity helped form local mountains and raised much of the state's elevation. Local levels of precipitation rose and fell. Montana was home to creatures like dogs and titanotheres. The Tertiary deposits from the southwestern part of the state are one of the best sources of plant and insect fossils in North America. More than two hundred species of plants, insects, and fishes are known from these deposits. The flora included water lilies and lotuses. During the Tertiary Montana was home to swamps that would later leave coal behind. The invertebrate fauna consisted of ants, bees, beetles, earwigs, caddisflies, crane flies, damselflies, lantern flies, mayflies, grasshoppers, leafhoppers, mosquitoes, snails, and wasps. Contemporary vertebrate fossils included feathers and, once in a while, a bird. Among the Oligocene flora of Montana were ailanthus, ash, beech, cattails, cedar, cinquefoil, dogwood, elm, ferns, milfoil fernbush, gooseberry, climbing grapes, grasses, greenbriers, horsetails, ironwood, katsura tree, liverwort, mountain mahogany, maple, false mermaid, mosses, oak, pennycress, pondweed, dawn redwood, roses, sedges, smoke tree, snowberry, spiraea, false strawberry, and vetches. Similar floras are known from the Florissant of Colorado and Oregon. Montana's Miocene plants and mollusks left behind remains at Bear Butte, northwest of Melville in Sweet Grass County's Fort Union Beds. The Miocene mammals preserved in the Fort Union beds included arctocyonids, insectivores, multituberculates, pantodonts, primates, taeniodonts. During the Miocene Montana was also home to camels and horses. Later into the Cenozoic Montana became colder and wetter. Glacial activity scoured the state. At this time mammoths, musk oxen, and dire wolves lived in the areas of the state not covered by glaciers.

== History ==
=== Indigenous interpretations ===
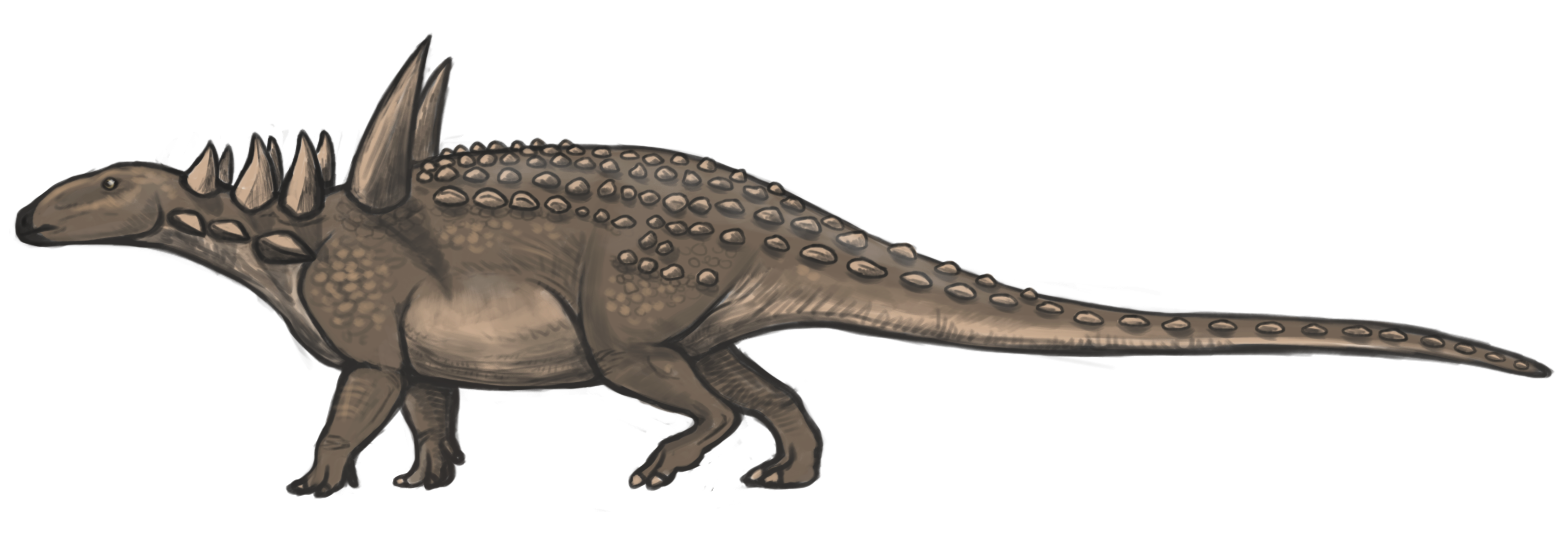
Sauropelta.

Archaeology has provided evidence that the indigenous peoples of Montana have been familiar with fossils since at least the time of the Clovis people. In the distant past the local indigenous people also collected fossils from Montana's Morrison Formation exposures. Archaeological sites on the Crow Reservation between Pryor and St. Xavier include fire pits lined with sizable dinosaur bones. These fossil-lined fire pits were probably used for cooking.

The Crow people prospected for minerals to use in making pigments in Unit VII of the Cloverly Formation, which is exposed in Montana. While looking for minerals they would have encountered fossils such as dinosaur bones. The Crow Indians sought red mineral pigments in the same Cloverly Formation strata that have produced dinosaur remains including Deinonychus, Sauropelta, and Tenontosaurus. It's likely that the local indigenous people have been familiar with the remains of these animals for "generations". Ancient indigenous people used to camp in the area and gather pine nuts to be roasted. The roasting process itself was actually accomplished with the aid of the armored scutes of Sauropelta. The scutes were used as hearths on which to roast the nuts as they provided an effective flat surface, but unlike the local sandstone, would not crumble under the intense heat used to open the limber pine cones and roast the nuts.

Plains Indians including the Blackfeet and Cheyenne have a tradition of using Baculites fossils to summon buffalo herds. When used this way the fossils are called "buffalo-calling stones", known as Iniskim to the Blackfeet of northern Montana and Alberta. This practice derives from the complex shapes of the fossil's internal structure, which can sometimes bear shapes resembling buffalo. Iniskim have been discovered in South Dakota archeological sites. Archeological evidence exists for the buffalo-calling stone tradition that is at least 1,000 years old.

Fossil eggs such as the Maiasaura eggs found in Montana may have been an influence on Navajo creation mythology. Another myth, this one Pawnee, may have been influenced by the Maiasaura eggs. The Pawnee told a story about two warriors who traveled far to the north of Nebraska where they found very large an unusual eggs that were found to be the eggs of a water serpent. The Crows attributed "spiritual power" to the fossilized dinosaur eggs of eastern Montana.

The Crow people also believed in water monsters. These were said to be alligator-like creatures living in the Little Bighorn, Rosebud, and Tongue Rivers. These myths may have been based on discoveries of marine reptile fossils such as crocodilians and mosasaurs eroding out of the river banks. The Crow also believe there were similar alligator-like monsters in the Missouri River. These were called Bulukse'e or Buruksam Wurukce, names meaning "large meat-eater" but commonly translated as "giant lizard or alligator". In more recent times, the term has been used for giant snapping turtles. The crow use the word Ba-sha-re for normal turtles, but Daa-ko is used for giant turtles. This latter term may refer to the common large fossil shells of Cretaceous turtles found in the area. The Crows also believe that thunder birds can be distinguished from eagles in that they only had two claws on their feet. This may be derived from observations of the isolated remains of the two-fingered forelimbs left by tyrannosaurids such as Tyrannosaurus rex, which could be mistaken for the limb of a large unknown kind of bird. The Triceratops and Tyrannosaurus fossils of Montana's Hell Creek Formation may have influenced Cheyenne beliefs in monsters called ahk.

When the Sioux lived around the Great Lakes, they imagined their mythical Water Monster Unktehi as a large aquatic buffalo-like mammal. This image was likely derived from early observations of large Pleistocene mammal fossils such as mammoths and mastodons eroding out of the banks of local lakes and rivers. As some groups of Sioux began moving west into the regions that includes Montana their depictions of Unktehi tended to converge on the characteristics of local fossils. Although Unktehi continued to be described as horned, it gradually became imagined as reptilian rather than the mammalian portrayals of the Sioux in the Great Lakes region, like the dinosaurs and mosasaurs of the region's Mesozoic rock. Unktehi was described as a snakelike monster equipped with feet, like the elongate sinuous mosasaurs who had four short limbs. Its back was described as ridged and saw-like, a configuration similar to the appearance of a fossil vertebral column eroding from rock. In more recent times Lakota storyteller James LaPointe has explicitly called Unktehi a dinosaur.

=== Scientific research ===
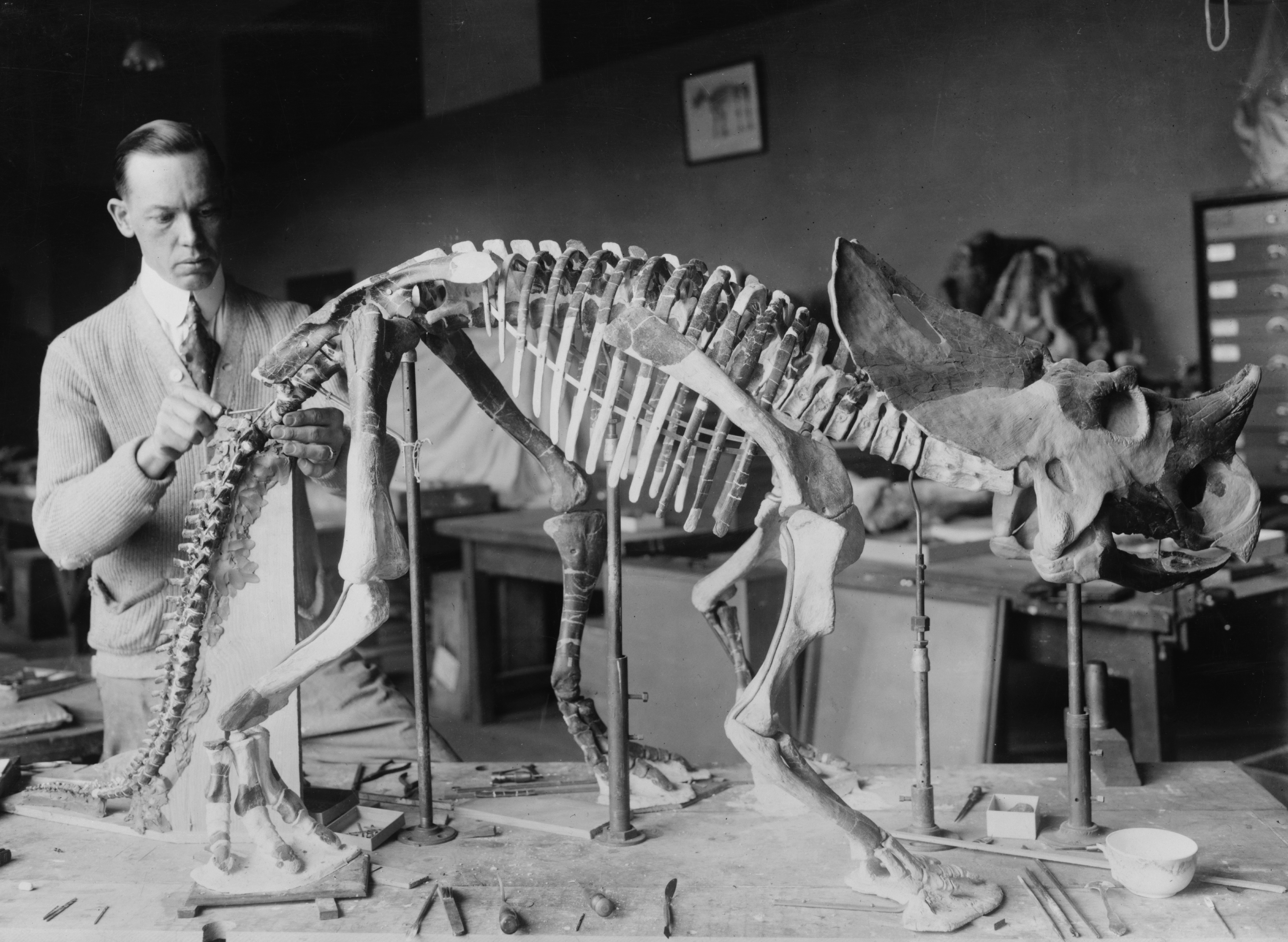
A Brachyceratops skeleton found in Montana being prepared for an exhibition in 1921.

In 1855, United States Geological Survey geologist Ferdinand Vandeveer Hayden was exploring a region of what was then called Nebraska Territory, but which is located what is now central Montana. Not far from the mouth of the Judith River he discovered fossils of bones, shells, and teeth. After returning from his expedition he gave the fossils to Joseph Leidy in Philadelphia. Leidy could tell that these teeth were different than those of any known animal, yet were recognizably dinosaurian based on their similarities to previously discovered dinosaur fossils in England. Leidy had made the first scientific identification of dinosaur fossils from Montana. As the remains were distinct from any previously described dinosaur taxa, Leidy erected three new genera and species for them; Deinodon horridus, Trachodon mirabilis, and Troodon formosus.

In 1901, Dr. Earl Douglass discovered fossil plants, mollusks, and vertebrae at Bear Butte, northwest of Melville in Sweet Grass County's Fort Union Beds. In 1933, another fossil site called the Scarritt site opened in the Fort Union beds. By the publication of a 1937 paper on the Fort Union beds by George Gaylord Simpson, 57 different fossil sites were known from the beds and 25 were of significant quality. Among the finds were arctocyonids, insectivores, multituberculates, pantodonts, primates, and taeniodonts.

Montanan Tertiary deposits in the Ruby Valley basin were first studied in 1947 by Dr. Herman F. Becker on behalf of the New York Botanical Garden. These deposits from the southwestern part of the state are one of the best sources of plant and insect fossils in North America. In 1959 Becker's Ruby Valley excavations uncovered about 5,000 specimens of more than two hundred species of plants, insects, and fishes. Invertebrate finds included ants, bees, beetles, earwigs, caddis flies, crane flies, damsel flies, lantern flies, may flies, grasshoppers, leaf hoppers, mosquitoes, snails, and wasps. Vertebrate remains included feathers, and, once in a while, a bird. In 1961 a new flora was found nearby in a badger burrow. The flora is called the Badger Flora. Among the different kinds of plants were water lilies and lotuses.

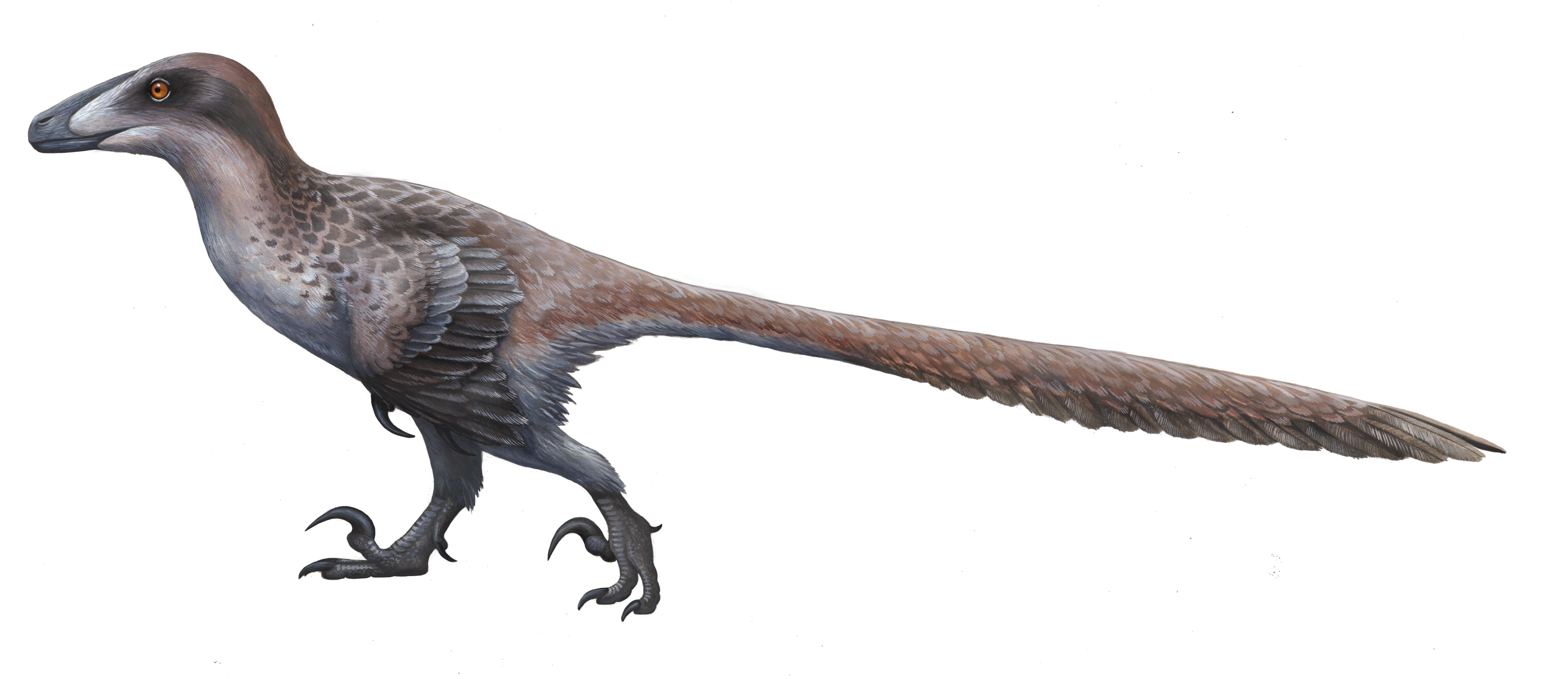
Deinonychus.

In 1964, John Ostrom led an expedition that included his student Robert T. Bakker into the south-central part of the state. The rocks they prospected were of the Cloverly Formation, dating back to the Early Cretaceous. Among their finds were the first documented remains of a small carnivorous dinosaur that would be named Deinonychus antirrhopus. This discovery helped ignite the dinosaur renaissance. It exhibited important anatomical similarities to birds that helped scientists shed antiquated ideas interpreting dinosaurs as "overgrown lizards".

In 1978, paleontologist Bill Clemens alerted Jack Horner and Bob Makela to the presence of unidentified dinosaur fossils in Bynum. Horner visited the town and recognized the remains as belonging to a duck-billed dinosaur. While in town the owner of a local rock shop, Marion Brandvold, showed him some tiny bones. Horner identified them as baby duck-bill bones. Horner also knew that this was an important find and convinced Brandvold to donate her fossils to a museum. She obliged and gave them to Princeton University. Horner's team prospected in the area where Brandvold found the baby hadrosaur fossils. Their effort paid off with the discovery of the first scientifically documented dinosaur eggs of the Western Hemisphere and a new kind of duck-bill, Maiasaura peeblesorum.

== People ==
Gloria Jean Siebrecht was born in Kalispell in 1940.

John R. Horner was born in Shelby on June 15, 1946.

== Natural history museums ==
- Carter County Museum, Ekalaka
- Makoshika Dinosaur Museum, Glendive
- Museum of the Rockies, Bozeman
- Phillips County Museum, Malta
- Montana Dinosaur Center, Bynum

== See also ==
- Paleontology in Idaho
- Paleontology in North Dakota
- Paleontology in South Dakota
- Paleontology in Wyoming
