= Plainview Formation =

Geologic formation in the United States

- Stratigraphic range: Albian; ~112–100 Ma
- Type: Geological formation
- Unit of: Dakota Group
- Underlies: Glencairn Formation
- Overlies: Lytle Formation

Lithology
- Primary: Sandstone
- Other: Shale, siltstone

Location
- Coordinates: 38.4°N 105.3°W
- Approximate paleocoordinates: 37.4°N 61.7°W
- Region: Colorado
- Country: United States
- Plainview Formation (the United States) Plainview Formation (Colorado)

The Plainview Formation is an Early Cretaceous (Albian) geologic formation of the Dakota Group in Colorado. Fossil ankylosaur tracks and tracks of Caririchnium sp. have been reported from the formation.

== Description ==
The formation overlies the Lytle Formation and is overlain by the Glencairn Formation and comprises resistant, brown-weathered sandstones, and dark shales and siilstones, also described as bioturbated brownish sandstones with black and grey silty or shaley sandstone intervals. The formation was deposited in a variety of near-shore and/or marginal marine environments. The tracks occur in the upper part of an estuarine point bar sequence, overlain by brackish bay or lagoon deposits.

== See also ==
- List of dinosaur-bearing rock formations
  - List of stratigraphic units with ornithischian tracks
    - Ankylosaur tracks
