= MNHM =

MNHM stands for:

- National Museum of Military History (Luxembourg), from its French name Musée National d'Histoire Militaire
- Morrison Natural History Museum in Colorado, United States
