= Lytle Formation =

Geologic formation in Colorado and New Mexico, US

Lytle Formation Lytle Sandstone
- Stratigraphic range: Aptian–Albian
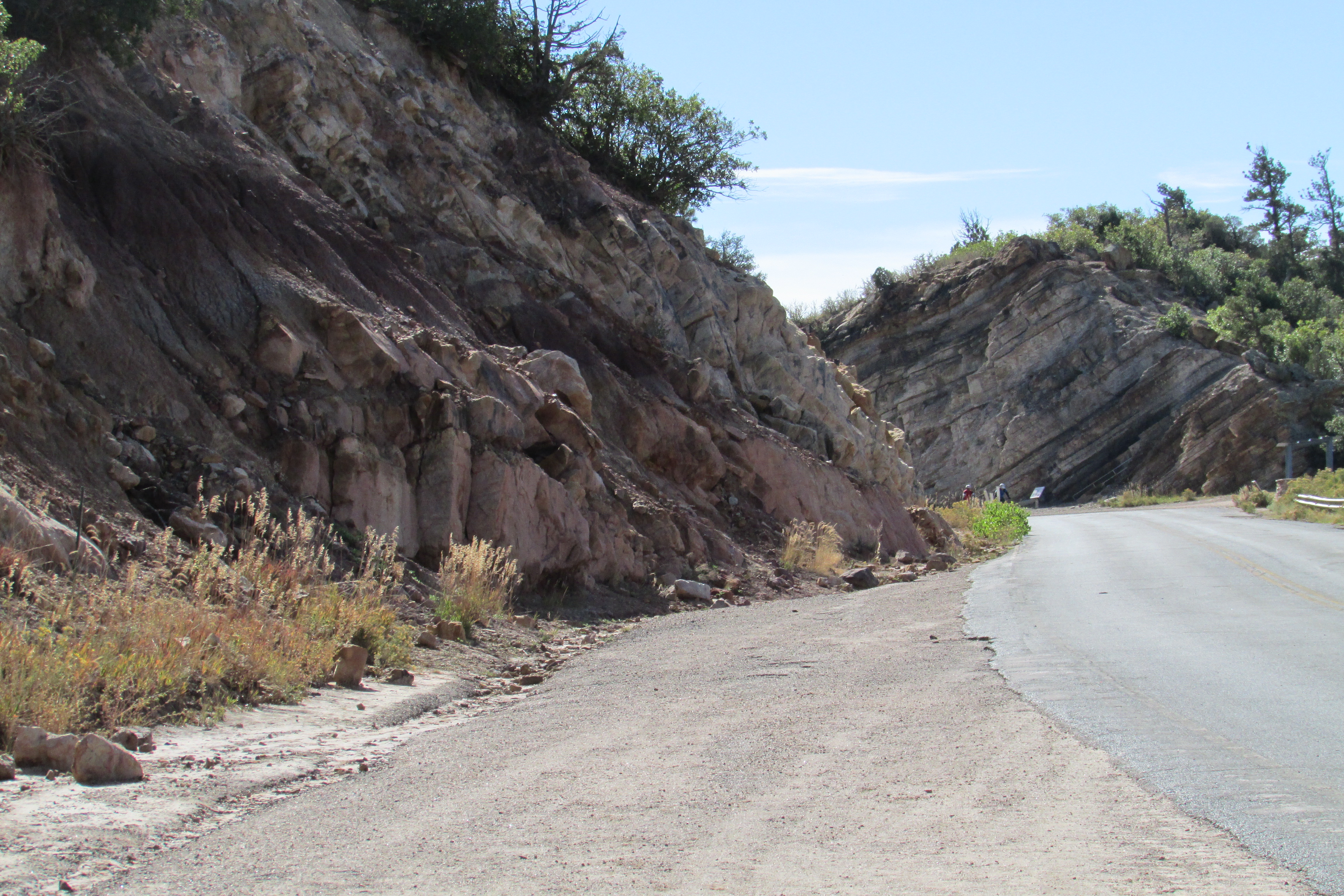
- South Platte Formation over Lytle Formation at Dinosaur Ridge, Colorado
- Type: Formation/Formation Member
- Unit of: North-central CO:Dakota Group; South-central CO:Purgatoire Formation
- Underlies: South Platte Formation (at Dinosaur Ridge); Glencairn Formation (valley of the Dry Cimarron)
- Overlies: Morrison Formation (unconformably)
- Thickness: 40–120 feet (12–37 m)

Lithology
- Primary: Sandstone
- Other: conglomeratic sandstone (notably chert gravel), variegated claystone

Location
- Coordinates: 38.6025°N 104.867778°W
- Region: Colorado; New Mexico; Wyoming
- Country: United States

Type section
- Named for: Lytle, Colorado
- Named by: G.I. Finlay
- Year defined: 1916
- Lytle Formation (the United States) Lytle Formation (Colorado)

The Lytle Formation or Lytle Sandstone is a geologic formation found in Wyoming, Colorado, and New Mexico.

== Description ==
The Lytle Formation consists of white to light gray gravels and conglomerates. It is variable in thickness, but is about 36 meters (118 ft) at the type location. It is separated from the underlying Morrison Formation by a significant regional unconformity. It is overlain by the South Platte Formation or the Glencairn Formation.

The formation is likely an early Cretaceous geologic unit, with its northern exposure running north and south in the Front Range foothills and the Dakota Hogback in northern Colorado and southern Wyoming where it is assigned formation rank within the Dakota Group. In south-central Colorado, the Lytle is an unassigned formation. The formation is also mapped in the valley of the Dry Cimarron in northeastern New Mexico, where it forms a prominent band in the lower parts of the cliffs.

The Lytle was the last (youngest) non-marine unit to form in the Denver Basin before the region was fully inundated by the Western Interior Seaway. It was formed above sea level from sediments carried by heavily laden rivers flowing from the eroding uplifts of the Sevier orogeny several tens of millions of years before the Rocky Mountains rose. It is particularly noted for abundant brown chert pebbles washed in from the uplifted Permian rock far to the west.

Detrital zircon geochronology of the Lytle Formation in the Raton Basin suggests a late Jurassic age for this unit. However, it is possible that the lack of younger zircons reflects a hiatus in deposition of airfall material.

== Fossils ==
Known fossils are fragments of petrified wood eroded from the west as well as undistinguished animal burrows, possibly Skolithos and Arenicolites. Body fossils are extremely rare, but a few ostracod and bivalve fossils are consistent with an Aptian to Albian age for the formation.

== History of investigation ==
The formation was first named as the Lytle sandstone member of the Purgatoire Formation by G.I. Finlay in 1916, for exposures near Lytle, Colorado. Finlay found no fossils in the unit, but regarded it as likely early Cretaceous in age. Waage subsequently traced the unit into northeastern New Mexico and northern Colorado.
