= Kiowa Shale =

Geologic formation in Kansas, United States

- Stratigraphic range: Albian around 101–97 Ma
- Type: Kansas: Formation
- Sub-units: Longford
- Underlies: Dakota Formation
- Overlies: Cretaceous Cheyenne Sandstone; Permian Wellington Formation; Jurassic rocks within the Kansas Red Hills

Lithology
- Primary: shale
- Other: mudstone, lignite (with amber)

Location
- Country: United States

Type section
- Named for: Kiowa County, Kansas
- Named by: Cragin, F.W., 1894

The Kiowa Formation or Kiowa Shale is a Cretaceous geologic formation in Kansas, diminishing to member status in Colorado and Oklahoma. In Colorado, the Kiowa Shale was classified as a member of the now abandoned Purgatoire Formation. In the vicinity of Longford, Kansas, the local Longford member comprises thinly bedded siltstone, clay, polished gravel, lignite, and sandstone suggests a river and estuary environment.

In other regions, the same strata is called Skull Creek Shale, named after its exposure in Skull Creek, in Wyoming.

== Development ==
At the time of the classification of the Kiowa (later 1900s), units were defined primarily by appearance and content in the context of the succession of fossils; and marine (ocean) sediments and fossils were generally assigned to units separate from terrestrial (land) sediments and fossils.

From the final, Late-Permian retreat of the Midcontinent Seaway to the Mid-Cretaceous, some 200 million years, the lands of future Kansas and neighboring states were raised well above sea level. The marine Permian rocks of the Midcontinent Seaway were exposed to the atmosphere and eroded by wind, rain, and rivers. Some terrestrial soils accumulated in the Jurassic, raising the Red Hills of southern Kansas and western Oklahoma.

Broadly, the definition of the Kiowa unit is restricted to marine deposits, mostly the massive shale. Pyrite-rich (iron disulfide) terrestrial mud, sand, and gravel below the marine shale are assigned to the Cheyenne Sandstone formation. The Limonite-rich (iron oxidide) terrestrial sands and muds above the marine shale are assigned to the base of the (lower) Dakota Formation in Kansas, the "J" oil sands of the Denver Basin, the Muddy Sandstone, or other correlating rocks.

Approximately 160 million years (Ma) ago, the Sevier orogeny commenced the subduction of the oceanic Farallon Plate underneath the continental North American Plate. With the unusual shallow subduction of the Farallon Plate, a broad and shallow seaway began to open generally north and south over the North American continent, named the Western Interior Seaway. As the sea water widened (transgressed) over the midcontinent, the east shore advanced over low plains. As that shoreline advanced, a thick layer of river mud and sand (Cheyenne) was deposited over the exposed Permian and Jurassic rocks of those plains. As the seawater spread and deepened, the deeper water deposited finer erosional sediments resulting in shale (Kiowa). After a few million years, the land rose and the seawater retreated, leaving a return to terrestrial sand, gravel, and mud (lower Dakota). Together, the Cheyenne, Kiowa, and lower Dakota record the first sequence of the Western Interior Seaway, referred to as the Skull Creek/Kiowa Cycle, and the particular time-constrained marine environment is named the Skull Creek/Kiowa Sea. Later cycles of the interior sea would follow, including the Greenhorn Sea and the Niobrara Sea

== Access ==
=== Coronado Heights ===
Coronado Heights is a public park established on one of the Dakota remnant hills forming the hummocky outliers of the Smoky Hill Buttes range of the Smoky Hills. While the tops of the buttes are resistant red Dakota sandstone, the first three hairpin turns of the access road climb up a slope of grass-covered Kiowa Shale. Small exposures of Kiowa Shale may be found along these turns or the nearby foot paths.

=== Indian Rock Park, Salina ===
The City of Salina was developed on a flat flood plain between the Smoky Hill River and the Saline River. However, just across a turn of the Smoky Hill River from the South to the East, the southeast corner of Salina rises upon a gently sloped bluff of tough shale (Wellington Formation). That landmark bluff is topped by the lower sandstones of the Kiowa Shale, possibly the "Longford Member" or similar material. Atop the hill in Indian Rock Park lie many sandstone outcrops and large sandstone boulders as remnants of the base of the Kiowa Shale.

== See also ==
- List of fossiliferous stratigraphic units in Kansas
- Paleontology in Kansas
- Plesiosaur stratigraphic distribution
