= Tucumcari Formation =

Geologic formation in New Mexico

- Stratigraphic range: Albian
- Type: Formation
- Underlies: Mesa Rica Sandstone
- Overlies: Morrison Formation

Lithology
- Primary: Shale
- Other: Sandstone

Location
- Coordinates: 35.1329442°N 103.7083319°W
- Region: New Mexico
- Country: United States

Type section
- Named for: Mount Tucumcari
- Named by: Dobrovolny and Summerson
- Year defined: 1947
- Tucumcari Formation (the United States) Tucumcari Formation (New Mexico)

The Tucumcari Formation is a geologic formation in New Mexico. It preserves fossils dating back to the Albian Age of the early Cretaceous period.

== Description ==
The formation consists of highly fossiliferous gray shale and buff calcareous sandstone with some limestone nodules. It overlies the Morrison Formation and is overlain by the Mesa Rica Sandstone.

The formation is interpreted as marine shales deposited during the Kiowa-Skull Creek transgression. It is likely the lateral equivalent of the Glencairn Formation.

== Fossils ==
More than 65 marine invertebrate species have been found in the Tucumcari Shale. The macrofossils are mostly bivalves, with some gastropods and ammonoids. Microfossils include ostracods, foraminiferans, and palynomorphs. Species found in the formation include the solitary corals Desmophyllum and Platycyathus, the bivalves Scabrotrigonia, Pteria, Texigryphaea, Botula, and Lopha, and gastropod Turritella. The shells show borings from clionid sponges and acrothoracic barnacles.

== History of investigation ==
The unit was first described by Jules Marcou in 1858 as Bed E of the Pyramid Mountain section. In 1892, W.F. Cummins described the Jurassic and Cretaceous section at Tucumcari Mountain as the "Tucumcari beds". Dobrovsky and Summerson assigned the unit to the Purgatoire Formation as the Tucumcari Shale Member in 1947. Griggs and Read abandoned the Purgatoire Formation in southeastern New Mexico and raised the Tucumcari Shale to formation rank in 1959.

== See also ==
- List of fossiliferous stratigraphic units in New Mexico
- Paleontology in New Mexico
