= Mesa Rica Sandstone =

Geologic formation in Oklahoma and New Mexico

- Stratigraphic range: Albian
- Type: Formation
- Unit of: Dakota Group
- Underlies: Pajarito Formation
- Overlies: Tucumcari Shale, Glencairn Formation
- Thickness: 33 meters (108 ft)

Lithology
- Primary: Sandstone

Location
- Coordinates: 35.227°N 104.223°W
- Region: New Mexico, Oklahoma
- Country: United States

Type section
- Named for: Mesa Rica
- Named by: Dobrovolny, Summerson, and Bates
- Year defined: 1947
- Mesa Rica Sandstone (the United States) Mesa Rica Sandstone (New Mexico)

The Mesa Rica Sandstone is a geologic formation in Oklahoma and New Mexico. It preserves fossils dating back to the Cretaceous period.

== Description ==
The Mesa Rica Sandstone consists of crossbedded white to buff sandstone. The sandstone is massive and medium- to coarse-grained. It is a very mature sandstone, consisting of almost pure quartz and kaolin, which may reflect its provenance as reworked sediments of the Morrison Formation, or may be due to a slow rate of deposition that permitted meteoric water (water originating as rain or snow) to circulate through the sediments for an unusually long time. In some locations, there is minor quartz-pebble conglomerate at the base of the formation, which lies on the Tucumcari Shale or Glencairn Formation. It is overlain by the Pajarito Formation and has a thickness of up to 33 meters (108 ft).

The formation was laid down in a low-accommodation deltaic environment.

== Fossils ==
Dinosaur remains diagnostic to the genus level are among the fossils that have been recovered from the formation.

The upper part of the formation preserves dinosaur trackways and is part of the "dinosaur freeway" megatracksite of New Mexico, Colorado, and Oklahoma. Dinosaur tracks were discovered in the formation at the spillway of Clayton Lake State Park in 1982, at Mosquero Creek in 1986, and at Mills Canyon in 1995. The Mills Creek site shows twelve distinct trackways. The Clayton Lake trackways are unusual in showing trail dragging traces. The trackways here are accessible by a trail with interpretive signage but are rapidly eroding in the lake spillway. Most of the tracks at the three sites have been identified as Charirichnium leonardii.

The Mosquero Creek tracks represent 81 individual ornithopod dinosaurs, of two distinct species, and includes a rare limping track. The trackways also preserve evidence of movement as a group.

The lower part of the Mesa Rica Sandstone preserves marine invertebrate fossils, including the ammonite Mortoniceras equidistans (Cragin)

== History of investigation ==
The unit was first named the Mesa Rica sandstone member of the Purgatoire Formation by Ernest Dobrovolny, Charles Summerson, and Robert Bates in 1947. It was raised to formation rank by Robert Griggs and Charles Read in 1959, who also abandoned the use of the Purgatoire Formation in northeastern New Mexico.

== See also ==
- List of fossiliferous stratigraphic units in Oklahoma
