= Morrison, Colorado =

Town in Colorado, United States

- Home rule town
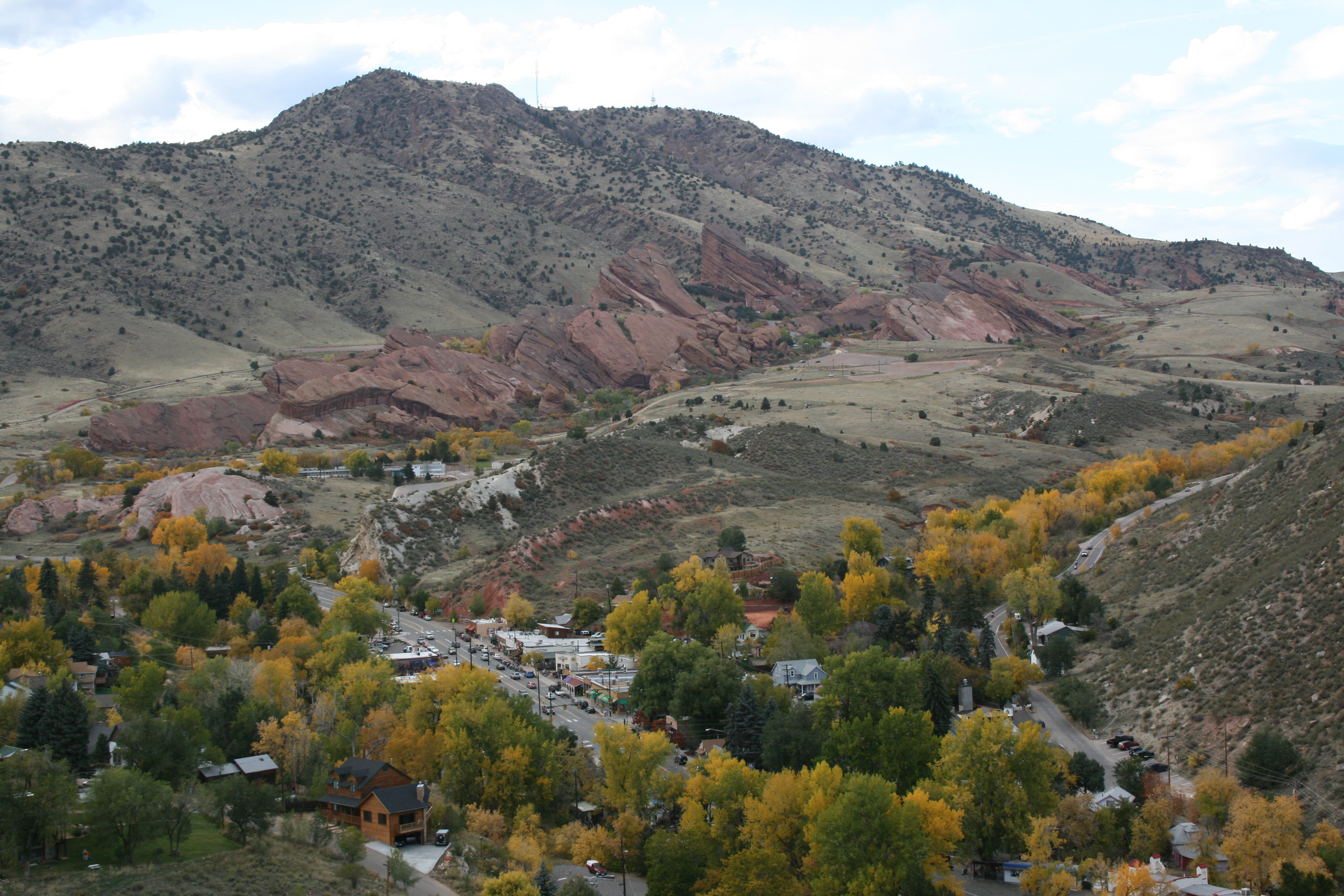
- Town of Morrison with Red Rocks Amphitheatre in background
- Motto: The Nearest Faraway Place
- Location of Morrison in Jefferson County, Colorado
- Coordinates: 39°37′45″N 105°12′20″W
- Country: United States
- State: Colorado
- County: Jefferson
- Incorporated: January 29, 1906

Government
  - Type: Home rule municipality
  - Mayor: Chris Wolfe

Area
  - Total: 1.64 sq mi (4.24 km^{2})
  - Land: 1.63 sq mi (4.23 km^{2})
  - Water: 0.0039 sq mi (0.01 km^{2})
- Elevation: 6,368 ft (1,941 m)

Population (2020)
  - Total: 396
  - Density: 242/sq mi (93.6/km^{2})
- Time zone: UTC-7 (MST)
  - Summer (DST): UTC-6 (MDT)
- ZIP code: 80465
- Area codes: Both 303 and 720
- FIPS code: 08-52075
- GNIS feature ID: 2413014
- Website: morrisonco.us

Morrison is a home rule municipality in Jefferson County, Colorado, United States. The population was 396 at the 2020 census.

== History ==
This small foothills settlement is named after George Morrison (April 16, 1822 – June 11, 1895), a builder and businessman who left a mark not only on the town that now bears his name, but on the history of the area. A stonemason who immigrated from Canada to the Mt. Vernon area in 1859, he helped found the town of Mt. Vernon and built the Mt. Vernon House, seat of the territorial government under Robert Steele, and an important stop for travelers on the Mt. Vernon Toll Road from Denver to the goldfields of the Rocky Mountains. He became a U.S. citizen on May 22, 1862. George Morrison later moved south to Bear Creek, where he founded the Morrison Stone, Lime, and Town Co., and in 1874 platted the town that became known as Morrison, or briefly as Mt. Morrison. With Gov. John Evans, he was instrumental in bringing the Denver, South Park and Pacific Railroad to Morrison in 1874.

As a quarryman, Morrison developed the building stone and other industrial stone (lime, gypsum) of the Morrison/Mt. Vernon area, bringing fame to the region for its high-quality dimension stone. Two of the three stone buildings he built in Morrison, as well as the Mt. Vernon House further north, are still standing; all three surviving buildings are recognized historic sites (National Register of Historic Places, 1976). Before its demolition in 1982, the original Evergreen Hotel, built by George Morrison in 1874, served as the first home of Sacred Heart College (now Regis University), and later as the Mt. Morrison Casino, where John Brisben Walker entertained many of the dignitaries he brought to the foothills as part of his promotional enterprises. The Morrison Schoolhouse he built served the town's educational needs from its construction in 1875 until 1955, and stands today as a private residence. The Cliff House, built as the Morrison family home in 1873, now provides guest lodging.

These landmarks represent a distinctive style of construction and are enduring monuments to George Morrison's contributions to Jefferson County's history. Stone for these structures was quarried in his "red sandstone quarry" at the end of the Dakota Hogback near Morrison. Building stone was also shipped to Denver, where it now comprises parts of the Brown Palace Hotel, Union Station, and "many of Denver's early day mansions".

Mount Morrison behind Red Rocks Park is also named after George Morrison. In the late 1800s, an important regional geologic layer of Late Jurassic age, the Morrison Formation, was named after the town of Morrison, and is today famous as the first discovery site of three 150-million-year-old dinosaurs, Apatosaurus, Diplodocus, and the Colorado state fossil, Stegosaurus. The Morrison Formation covers parts of thirteen western states and has yielded much of our understanding of the extinct animals that lived in the West so long ago.

=== Dinosaur discoveries ===
In 1877, the holotypic remains of the dinosaurs Stegosaurus armatus and Apatosaurus ajax were discovered near Morrison by Arthur Lakes. The majority of these fossils were shipped to Othniel Charles Marsh at Yale's Peabody Museum of Natural History in New Haven, Connecticut. These finds from the Morrison area figured in the 19th century "Bone Wars" between rival paleontologists Marsh and Edward Drinker Cope.

In 1896, the Late Jurassic section of sedimentary rock excavated by Lakes was formally named the Morrison Formation for the town near the prominent outcrops where it was described (Eldridge, 1896). In 1944, a type locality was designated at the roadcut along the north side of W. Alameda Parkway, 2 miles (3 km) north of Morrison, in SE/4 sec. 23, T. 4 S., R. 70 W. (Waldschmidt and LeRoy, 1944).

The Morrison Natural History Museum houses and displays some fossils found by Lakes, and museum staff have begun reworking Lakes' original digs at Quarry 10. In 2006, the MNHM reported rare adult Stegosaurus tracks from the Morrison area. A year later the first hatchling Stegosaurus tracks were reported. These fossils are on display at the museum.

Cretaceous-age dinosaur tracks and one of Lakes' historic dig sites can still be viewed on what is now known as Dinosaur Ridge east of Morrison.

Also located near Morrison is a significant archaeological site; known as the LoDaisKa site, it was inhabited for approximately 7,500 years.

=== 20th century ===
The Town of Morrison was officially incorporated following a unanimous election on January 9, 1906. Sixty-nine votes were cast. On February 13, 1906, a second election gave the newly created town a board of trustees. The first mayor was Thomas Cowan Morrison, son of the town's founder. The original trustees were Dr. Frank L. Luce, Charles Pike, Jacob Schneider, J.W. McLean, Peter O. Nelson, and Lawrence E. "Lee" LaGrow. Most of those names are well recognized as pioneers in Morrison's history. The new board held its first meeting on February 14, 1906.

Morrison's first ordinances were passed in February and March 1906, as the original board began the process of managing the town's affairs. The first set a fiscal year beginning March 1, directed the clerk to certify valuation and the board to levy taxes based thereon, and directed the town treasurer to collect funds from the county treasurer.

Pete Morrison, grandson of the town's founder and son of the first mayor, achieved fame during the early 1900s as a cowboy star in silent film, and ultimately had his own studio, Lariat Productions, in Hollywood.

In 1976, the Morrison Historic District was listed on the National Register of Historic Places.

=== 21st century ===
In April 2024, The Red Hotel, Morrison’s first hotel and commercial project in 60 years, was approved after 15 months of debate and redesigns. The three-story, 15,000-square-foot boutique hotel will feature 22 themed rooms, a coffee shop, and a rooftop terrace. Construction began in May 2025, with an opening date planned to coincide with the 2026 Red Rocks concert season.

== Geography ==
According to the United States Census Bureau, the town has a total area of 2.2 square miles (5.7 km^{2}), all of it land. Morrison is approximately 20 miles (32 km) southwest of Denver and is located on State Highway 470 and Morrison Road.

The Morrison postal ZIP code (80465) extends west up Turkey Creek Canyon and south of the town. It thus applies to an area covering approximately 5,000 addresses. Because the Morrison Post Office serves this large area beyond the town boundaries proper, many events and people connected with "Morrison" are actually in unincorporated portions of Jefferson County.

== Demographics ==
Historical population
Census	Pop.	Note	%±
1880	186		—
1890	254		36.6%
1910	251		—
1920	195		−22.3%
1930	177		−9.2%
1940	216		22.0%
1950	306		41.7%
1960	426		39.2%
1970	439		3.1%
1980	478		8.9%
1990	465		−2.7%
2000	430		−7.5%
2010	428		−0.5%
2020	396		−7.5%
U.S. Decennial Census

== Government ==
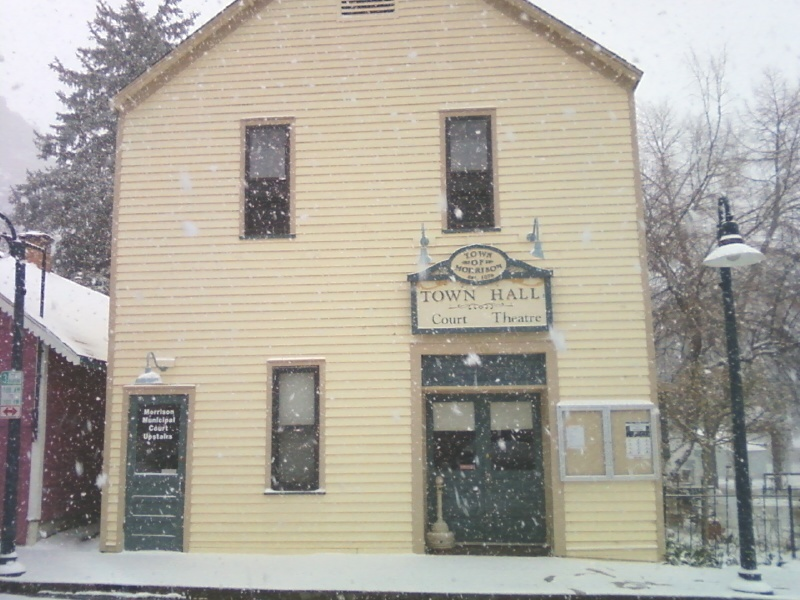
Morrison Town Hall

The local government features a mayor, town manager and a board of trustees.

Morrison was widely known as a speed trap, with press reports indicating that traffic fines accounted for nearly half of the town's $2.6 million budget. Before the police department was disbanded in 2025, over 90% of its enforcement activity was dedicated to issuing speeding tickets. The town now contracts with Jefferson County Sheriff's Office for enforcement services.

== Notable people ==
- Adolph Coors III, CEO of Coors Brewing Company
- Margaret Feinberg, Christian writer
- Pete Morrison, silent film actor
- Patrick Park, folk singer
- Trey Parker, co-creator of South Park
- Ricky Rahne, Penn State football offensive coordinator
- Jim Suttle, former mayor of Omaha, Nebraska
- Robert Hall Tinker, former mayor of Rockford, Illinois
- Peter Zeihan, political consultant

== See also ==
- Arthur Lakes discovers first Stegosaurus and Apatosaurus fossils near Morrison in 1877
- Morrison Fossil Area National Natural Landmark
- Morrison Natural History Museum
- Red Rocks Park and Amphitheatre
