= Arthur Lakes =

American geologist, artist, writer, teacher and Episcopalian minister

- Born: December 21, 1844; Martock, Somerset, England
- Died: November 21, 1917 (aged 72); Nelson, British Columbia, Canada
- Education: The Queen's College, Oxford
- Scientific career
- Fields: Geology; Art
- Workplaces: Colorado School of Mines

Arthur Lakes (December 21, 1844—November 21, 1917) was an American geologist, artist, writer, teacher and Episcopalian minister. He captured much of his geological and palaeontological field work in sketches and watercolours. Lakes is credited with successfully deciphering much of the geology of Colorado and, as an economic geologist, guiding mineral exploration which was so important to the State.

== Career ==
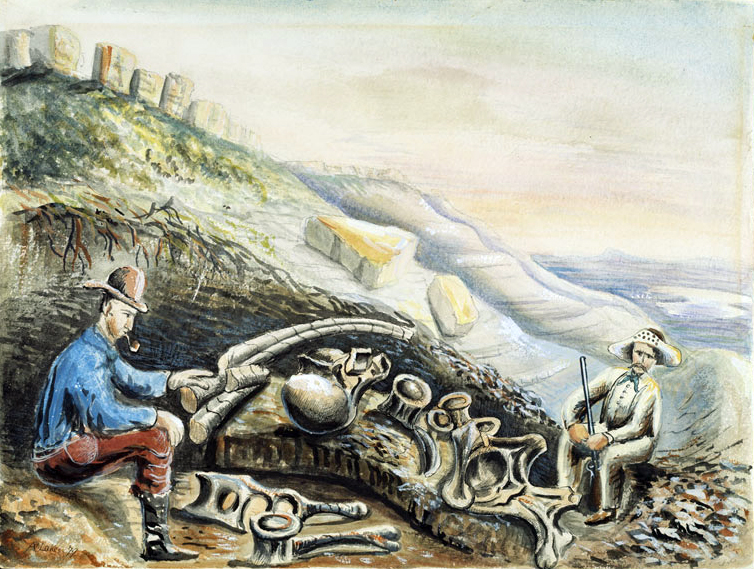
Lakes's sketch of expedition members in Como Bluff

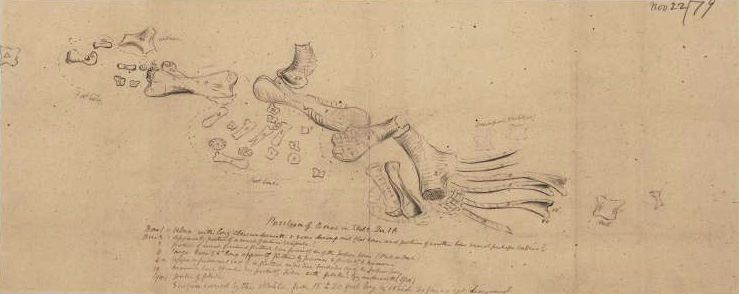
Sketch of bones in skeleton by Arthur Lakes, 1879

Lakes was a part-time professor at what later became the Colorado School of Mines. Having sent a fossilized vertebra specimen from the Morrison Formation in the Kansas Territory to Othniel Charles Marsh in 1877, he was then employed by Marsh to seek other discoveries, in the so-called Bone Wars. He went on to unearth fossilized remains of Stegosaurus, Apatosaurus, Camptosaurus, and Allosaurus. Lakes sent the tooth to Marsh identifying it as a "saurian tooth". It remained unidentified until around 2000 when it was rediscovered by Kenneth Carpenter of the Denver Museum of Nature and Science while he was looking at Lakes's fossils at the Yale Peabody Museum.

While he was working for Marsh at Como Bluff, Lakes was visited by Marsh's Bone Wars opponent, Edward Drinker Cope. His collaboration with both men was inadvertently the source of increased animosity between them. Lakes made the original discovery of the fossils in the formation of the Dinosaur Ridge near Morrison, Colorado. Lakes also drilled several test oil wells in the Golden and Morrison area, however they were not successful producing wells.

During this time, he also worked as a teacher at what is now the Colorado School of Mines and as a clergyman. When he retired from fossil hunting, he went on to work for the U.S. Geological Survey. He edited a succession of geological and mining journals. His byline appears on over 800 newspaper and journal articles. Lakes and his two well-educated sons eventually went into business as mining engineers, relocating from Colorado to Ymir, British Columbia in 1912. Arthur Lakes died there in 1917, still "tanned from the outdoors life he led."

== Awards and honors ==
Lakes was inducted into the National Mining Hall of Fame in Leadville, Colorado, in September 2010.

The Arthur Lakes Library at the Colorado School of Mines is named in his honor.

== Publications ==
- Lakes, Arthur (1888). Geology of Colorado Ore Deposits. Denver, Colorado: News Print Co. OCLC 3309768.
- Lakes, Arthur (1896). Prospecting for Gold and Silver in North America. Scranton, Pennsylvania: Colliery Engineer Co. OCLC 1084372317.
