= Archaeanthus =

Archaeanthus Temporal range: Early Cretaceous to Late Cretaceous (Albian-Cenomanian), 106.3–93.9 Ma

Scientific classification
- Kingdom: Plantae
- Clade: Tracheophytes
- Clade: Angiosperms
- Clade: Magnoliids
- Order: Magnoliales
- Family: Magnoliaceae
- Genus: †Archaeanthus; Dilcher & Crane
- Species: †A. linnenbergeri

Binomial name
- †Archaeanthus linnenbergeri Dilcher & Crane

Extinct genus of angiosperm

Archaeanthus is an extinct genus of flowering plants known from the Cretaceous of North America. It was a member of the Magnoliaceae family. The fossil evidence includes multifollicular fruits, perianth parts, floral bud scales, and leaves, all suggesting it belonged to a plant with large, insect-pollinated flowers resembling magnolias. It has been specifically suggested that the plant may have relied on Beetles for pollination. The structure of Archaeanthus demonstrates that several floral traits considered "basal" among angiosperms—such as helically arranged floral organs and numerous ovules—were already present by the mid-Cretaceous, supporting the magnoliid hypothesis of early flower evolution. There is some debate regarding its exact placement within the Magnoliaceae family with some suggesting it could be a relative of Tulip trees.

== Distribution ==
Archaeanthus is known from the Dakota Formation of Kansas.
