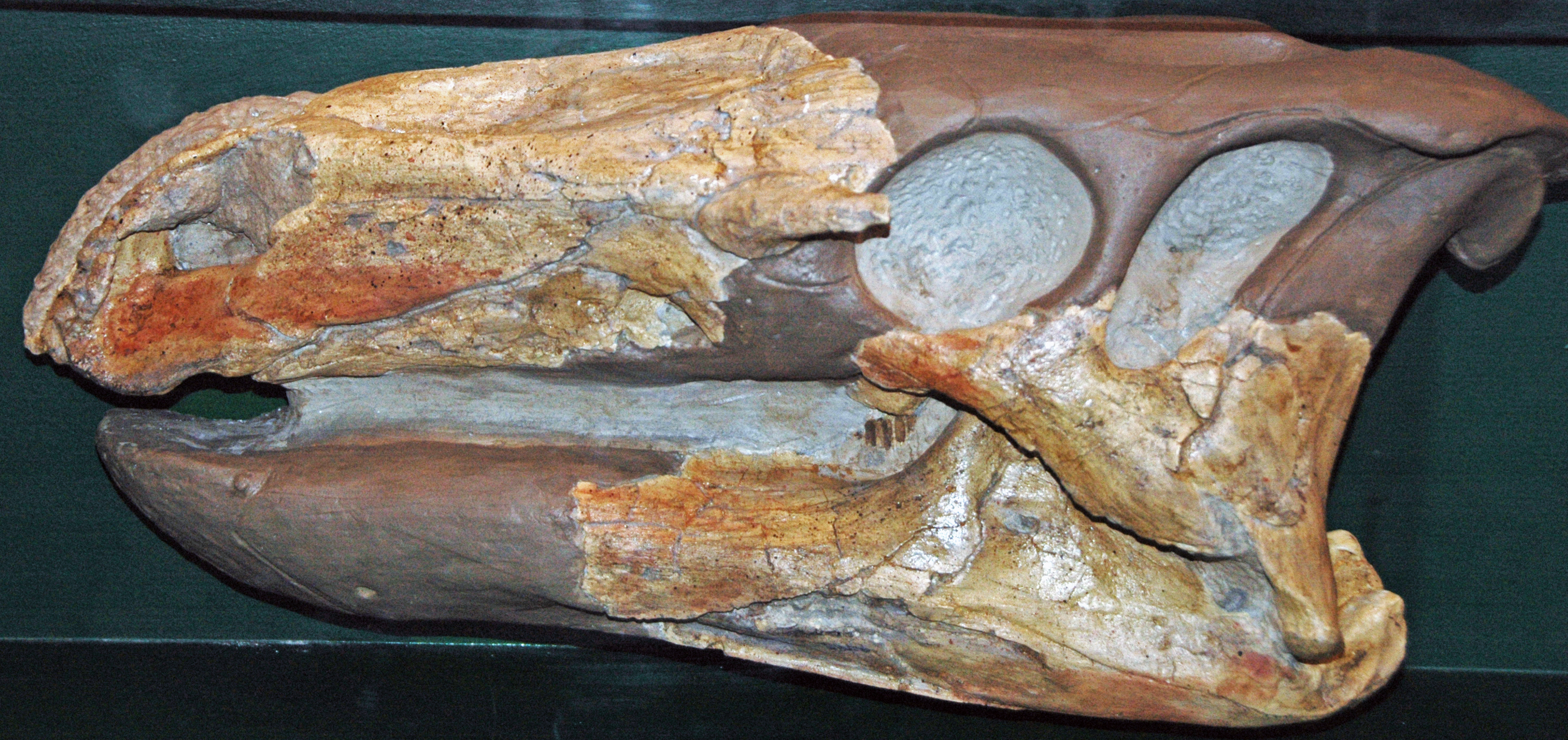
- Holotype skull, white parts are reconstructed

Scientific classification
- Kingdom: Animalia
- Phylum: Chordata
- Class: Reptilia
- Clade: Dinosauria
- Clade: †Ornithischia
- Clade: †Ornithopoda
- Clade: †Styracosterna
- Genus: †Theiophytalia; Brill & Carpenter, 2006
- Species: †T. kerri

Binomial name
- †Theiophytalia kerri Brill & Carpenter, 2006

= Theiophytalia =

Theiophytalia Temporal range: Early Cretaceous, 112 Ma

Extinct genus of dinosaurs

Theiophytalia is a genus of herbivorous iguanodontian dinosaur from the lower Cretaceous period (Aptian-Albian stage, about 112 million years ago) of Colorado, USA. It contains a single species, T. kerri.

== Description ==
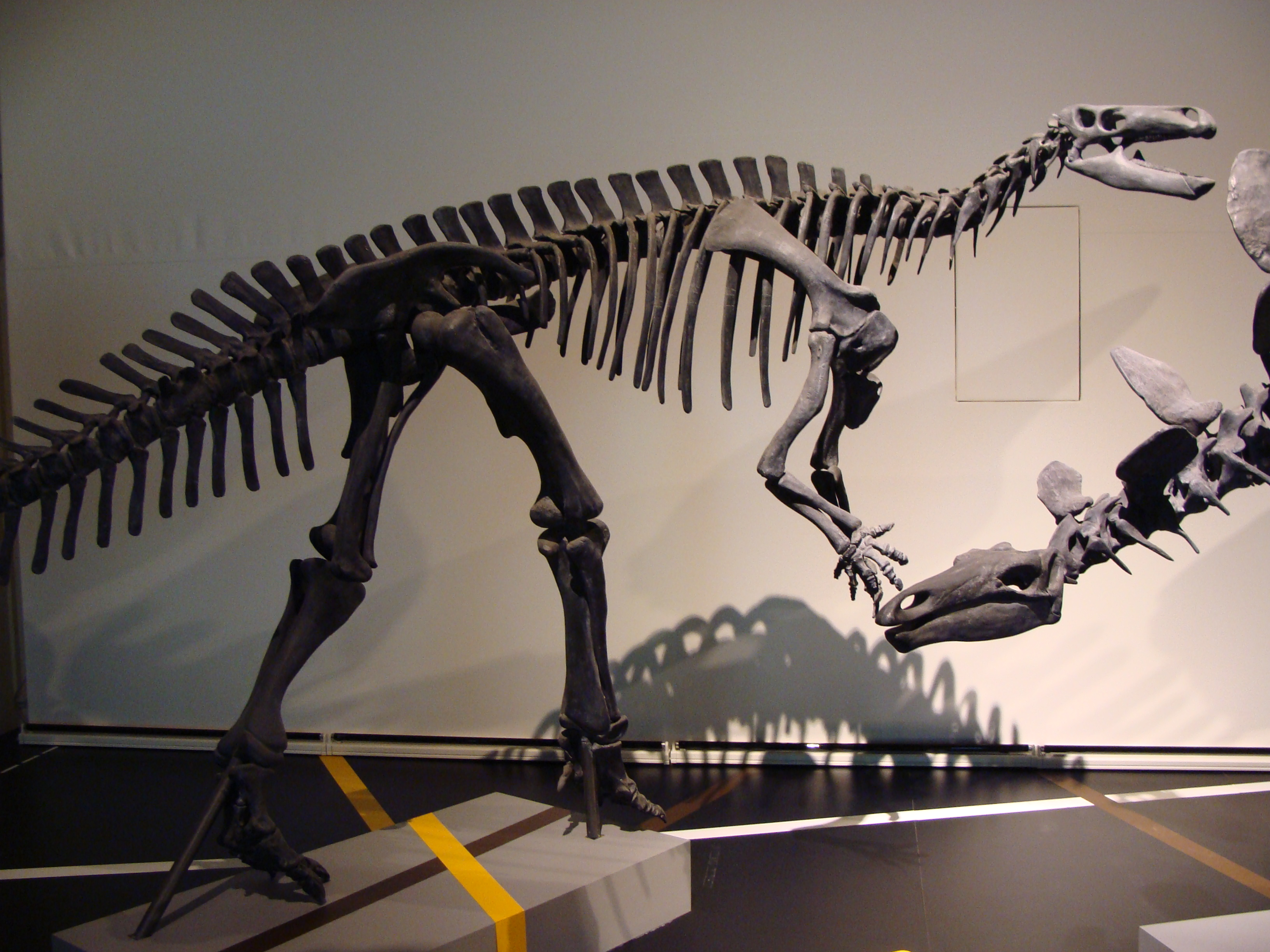
Reconstructed Theiophytalia skull mounted on a Camptosaurus skeleton cast, Museo Nacional de Ciencias Naturales, Madrid

Detailed comparisons by Brill and Carpenter (2006) also showed that the skull differed in a number of key features from that of Camptosaurus, namely: a longer, heavier, and more rugose snout; a wider dorsal process on the maxilla; a proportionally smaller antorbital fenestra; and stouter quadrate, with a bulbous articulation for the lower jaw. Compare the skull image with that of Camptosaurus. Therefore, they put it into its own genus and species.

== Discovery ==
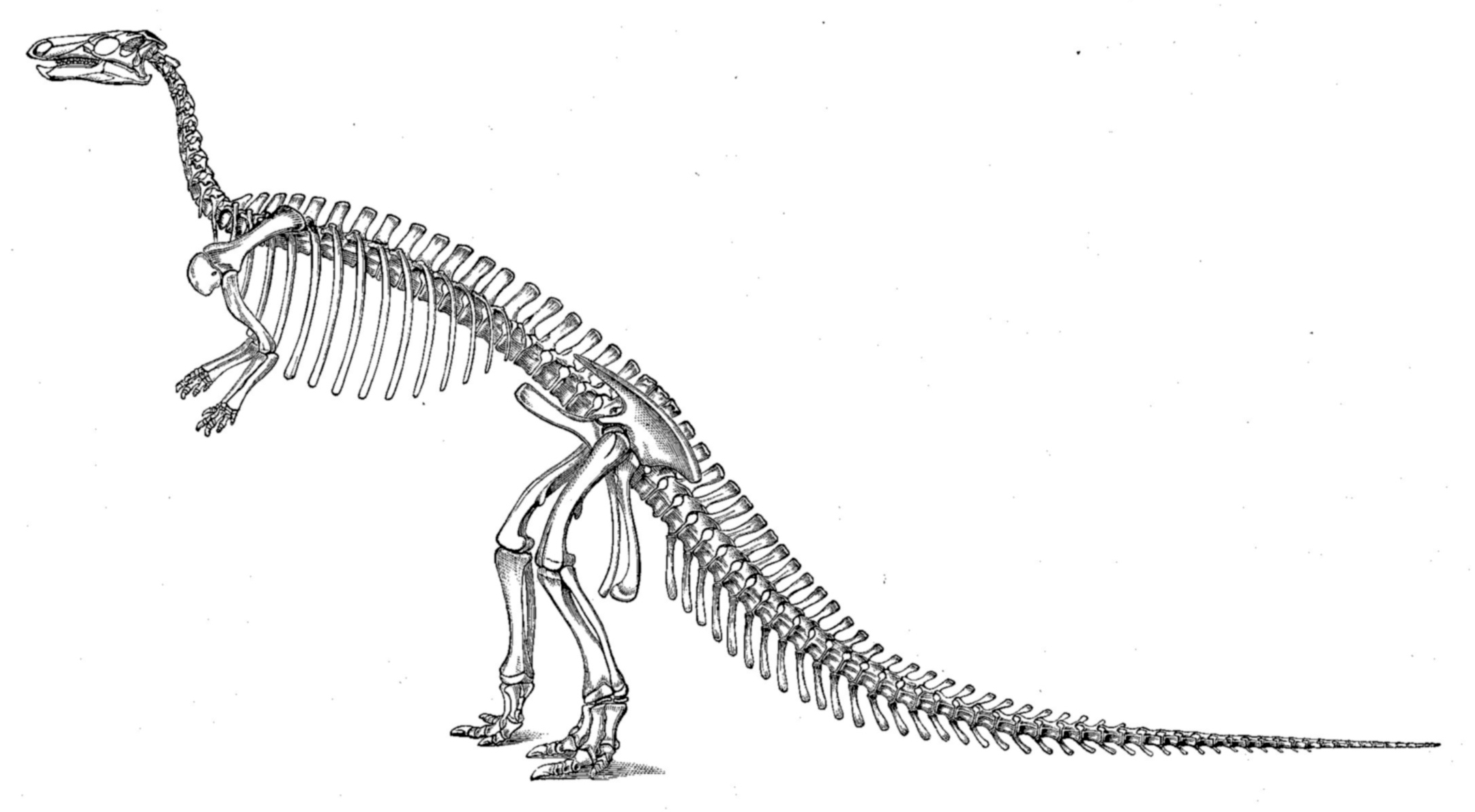
Historical skeletal restoration of Camptosaurus by O.C. Marsh, with skull based on remains now referred to Theiophytalia.

In 1878, a student of Colorado College named James Kerr found a partial ornithopod skull at Garden of the Gods park in El Paso County, Colorado. The skull, YPM 1887, was referred by O.C. Marsh (affirmed by Gilmore, 1909), to whom the skull was given in 1886, as that of Camptosaurus amplus. Gilmore used the skull to reconstruct the skull of Camptosaurus assuming that it came from the Morrison Formation. However, microscopic comparisons of thin-sections of the Mesozoic formations in the Garden of the Gods showed that the specimen actually came from the Lytle Member of the Purgatoire Formation; therefore, the skull was Early Cretaceous in age.

The generic name is, from Greek, θειος, theios: "divine" + Greek φυταλία, phytalia: "garden", or "garden of the gods". Garden of the Gods is a park in Colorado Springs, Colorado, where a skull, the only fossil of the genus yet to be discovered, was found in 1878. The specific name kerri honors James Hutchinson Kerr, who found the specimen.

== Classification ==
The article describing the find classified Theiophytalia as intermediate in derivation between Camptosaurus and Iguanodon. The type species is Theiophytalia kerri. In 2010 and 2011 cladistic analyses of McDonald and colleagues, Theiophytalia has been recovered as a basal member of the Styracosterna and its closest relative was Hippodraco.

- Ankylopollexia
  - Camptosaurus
  - Styracosterna
    - Uteodon
    - - - Hippodraco
        - Theiophytalia
      - - Iguanacolossus
        - - Lanzhousaurus
          - - Kukufeldia
            - - Barilium
              - Hadrosauriformes
