= Pajarito Formation =

Geologic formation in New Mexico and Texas

- Stratigraphic range: Albian; ~112–100 Ma
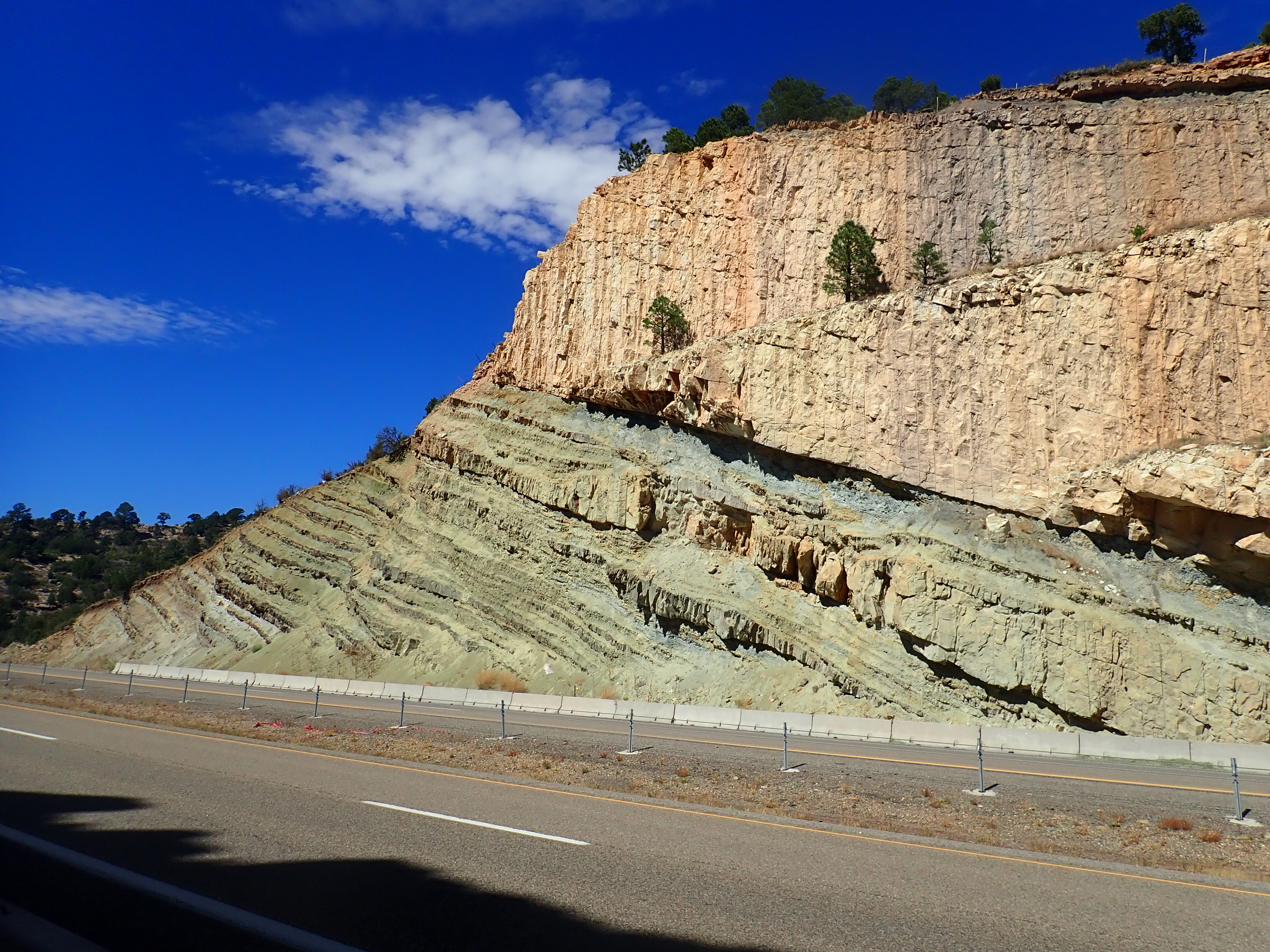
- Pajarito Formation beds (lower left) in road cut on I-25, Romeroville, New Mexico, USA
- Type: Formation
- Unit of: Dakota Group
- Underlies: Romeroville Sandstone, Graneros Shale. Dakota Sandstone
- Overlies: Mesa Rica Sandstone
- Thickness: up to 20 m (66 ft)

Lithology
- Primary: Shale
- Other: Sandstone, siltstone

Location
- Coordinates: 35.0787°N 103.7998°W
- Region: New Mexico, west Texas
- Country: United States

Type section
- Named by: Dobrovolny, Summerson, and Bates
- Year defined: 1947
- Pajarito Formation (the United States) Pajarito Formation (New Mexico)

The Pajarito Formation is a geologic formation in eastern New Mexico and west Texas. It preserves fossils dating back to the Albian Age of the Cretaceous Period.

== Description ==
In Quay County, New Mexico, where the unit was first described, it consists of poorly cemented brown sandstone and gray shale and is 50–60 feet (15–18 m) thick. It overlies the Mesa Rica Formation and underlies the Graneros Shale, and is assigned to the Purgatoire Group. Further north, in the valley of the Dry Cimarron, the formation consists of medium gray shale and is 10–20 meters (33–66 ft) thick.

The formation was deposited in a shallow marine. or delta plain environment. This marked the onset of the Greenhorn marine cycle in northeastern New Mexico.

== Fossils ==
The formation contains abundant fossil remains of the oyster Ostrea quadriplicata, a fossil of early Cretaceous age.

Dinosaur trackways are preserved in the sandstone and silty sandstone horizons of the formation, which is part of the "dinosaur freeway" megatracksite of New Mexico, Colorado, and Oklahoma. Dinosaur tracks were discovered in the Pajarito Formation and underlying Mesa Rica Formation at the spillway of Clayton Lake State Park in 1982. The Clayton Lake trackways are unusual in showing trail dragging traces. The trackways here are accessible by a trail with interpretive signage but are rapidly eroding in the lake spillway. Most of the tracks have been identified as Caririchnium leonardii.

== History of investigation ==
The formation was first named as the Pajarito shale member of the Purgatoire Formation by Drobovolny et al. in 1947. They designated neither a type location nor an origin for the name, though it was originally mapped in Quay County, New Mexico. It was raised to formation rank by Griggs and Read in 1959, who also abandoned the use of the Purgatoire Formation in northeastern New Mexico. Kues and Lucas identified the formation in the valley of the Dry Cimarron in 1987 and concluded it was late Albian in age.

== See also ==
- List of dinosaur-bearing rock formations
  - List of stratigraphic units with ornithischian tracks
    - Indeterminate ornithischian tracks
