= Purgatoire Formation =

Purgatoire Formation (abandoned)
- Stratigraphic range: Early Cretaceous, 112 Ma
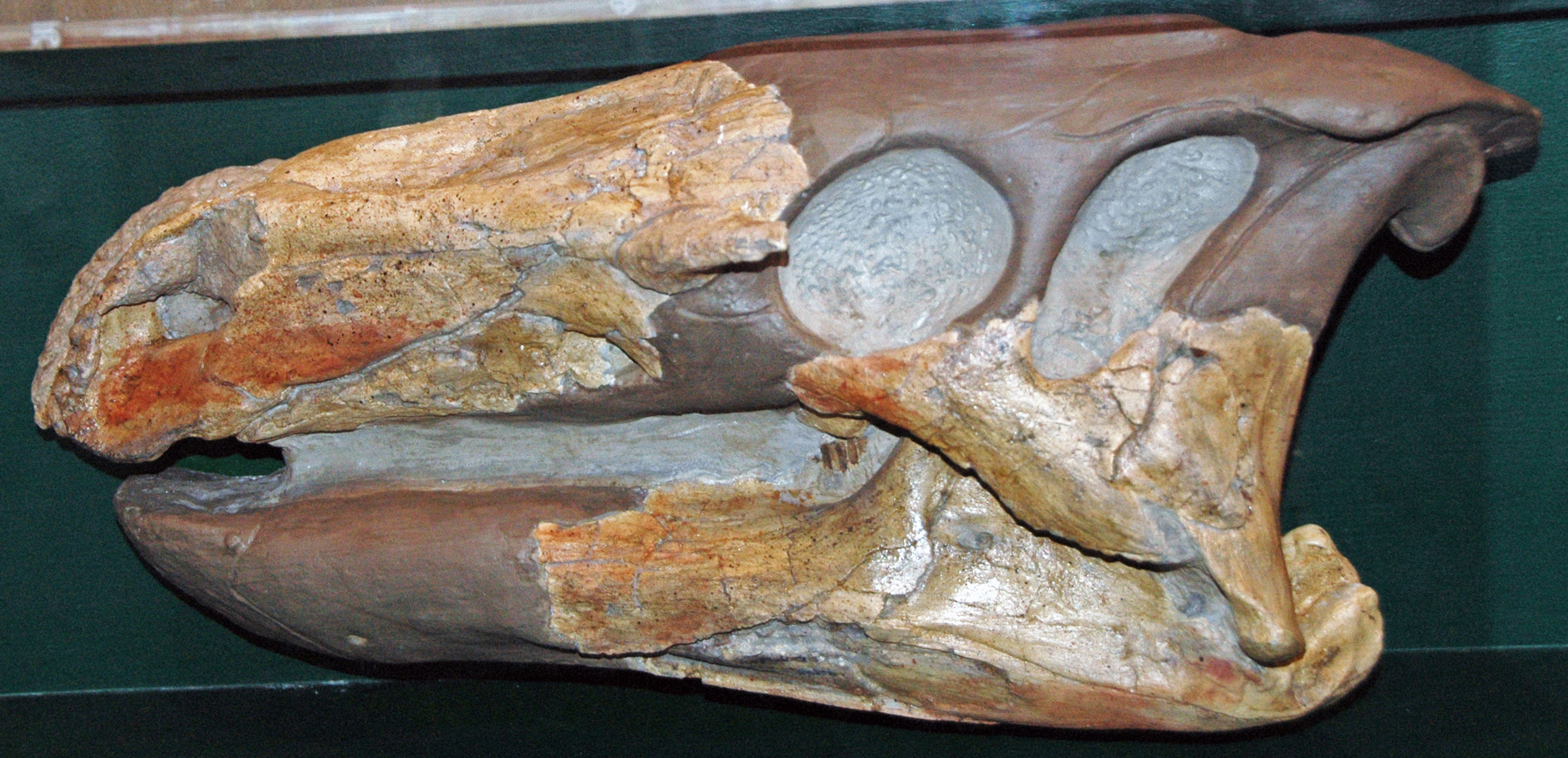
- Theiophytalia skull from the Purgatoire Formation (Colorado)
- Type: Formation

Location
- Region: Colorado
- Country: United States

The Purgatoire Formation is an abandoned (1987) Cretaceous period geologic formation classification. The classification was used in Colorado, New Mexico, and Oklahoma, with mentions in older geologic literature in neighboring states.

Units previously classified as members of the abandoned formation, including Lytle, Mesa Rica, Pajarito, Romeroville, and Glencairn, have been generally elevated to formation rank. Particularly, significant divisions of the Purgatoire classification, Lytle and Glencairn, were realized as having characteristics of formations in their own right as well as representing the greatest disconformity in the Lower Cretaceous sediments of the Western Interior Seaway. Rather than including these promoted formations in an elevated Purgatoire Group, the Mesa Rica, Pajarito, and Romeroville were placed in a definition of the Dakota Group local to the Dry Cimarron.

== See also ==
- List of fossiliferous stratigraphic units in Colorado
- Paleontology in Colorado
