= Romeroville Sandstone =

- Stratigraphic range: Cenomanian
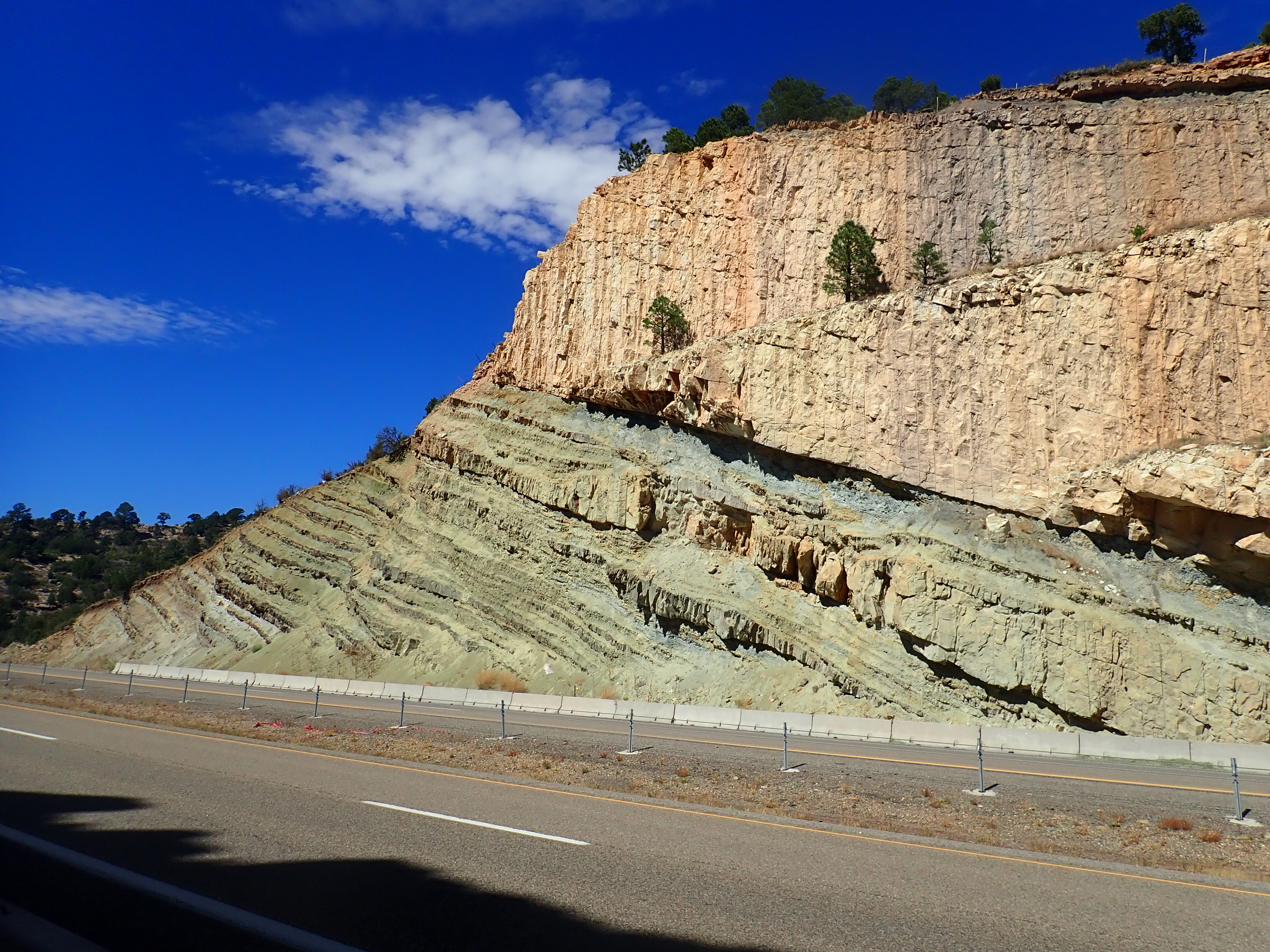
- Romeroville Sandstone beds resting on Pajarito Formation, I-25 road cut, Romeroville, New Mexico, USA
- Type: Formation
- Unit of: Dakota Group
- Underlies: Graneros Shale
- Overlies: Pajarito Formation
- Thickness: up to 9 m (30 ft)

Lithology
- Primary: Sandstone
- Other: Siltstone

Location
- Coordinates: 35.5258°N 105.2380°W
- Region: New Mexico
- Country: United States

Type section
- Named for: Settlement of Romeroville, New Mexico
- Named by: Kues and Lucas
- Year defined: 1987
- Romeroville Sandstone (the United States) Romeroville Sandstone (New Mexico)

The Romeroville Sandstone is a geologic formation in northeastern New Mexico. It likely was deposited in the Cenomanian Age of the Cretaceous Period.

== Description ==
The formation consists of yellow-gray quartz sandstone with minor siltstone. The sandstone is planar crossbedded and bioturbated and locally pebbly. It overlies the Pajarito Formation and is in turn overlain by the Graneros Shale. Maximum thickness is 9 meters (30 ft).

The formation is interpreted as the onset of a marine transgression of the Greenhorn cycle.

== History of investigation ==
The formation was first named by Kues and Lucas in 1987 for previously undivided Dakota Group beds at the Romeroville Gap. Kues and Lucas also identified it at Clayton Lake and in the valley of the Dry Cimarron.
