= Dakota Formation =

Rock units in midwestern North America

Dakota Formation / Group
- Stratigraphic range: Cenomanian, around 100–95 Ma
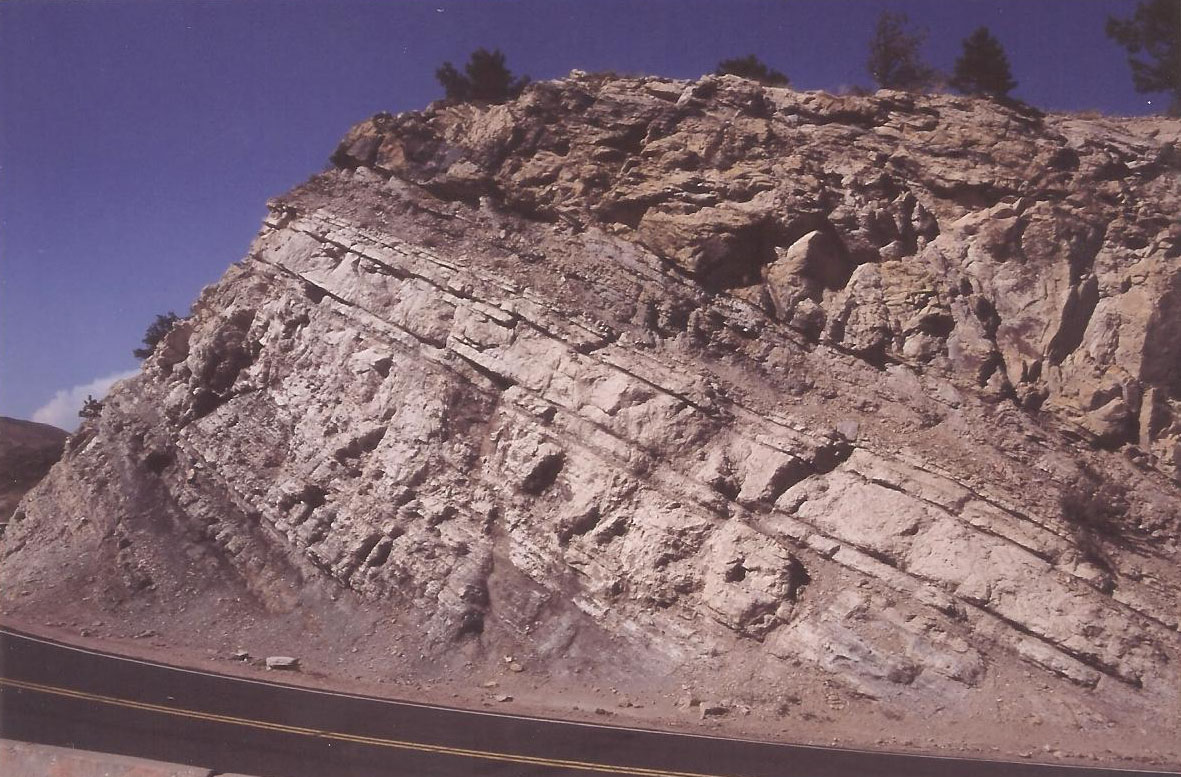
- Road cut into the lower Dakota Group at crest of Dinosaur Ridge, near Golden, Colorado
- Type: Geological formation or group
- Sub-units: Type Location: Formation (Nebraska/Iowa): Woodbury; Nishnabotna Formation (Kansas): D/Johnson Clay Member; J/Terra Cotta Clay Member Formation (San Juan Basin, etc.): Twowells Tongue; Paguate Tongue; Cubero Tongue Formation (sw Utah): (undivided conglomerate) Group (Dinosaur Ridge): South Platte Formation; Lytle Formation Group (Denver Basin): Muddy Formation; Skull Creek Shale; Plainview Sandstone; Lytle Formation Group (Williston Basin): Mowry Shale; Newcastle Formation; Skull Creek Shale; Inyan Kara Group (Colorado Plateau): Naturita Formation; Cedar Mountain Formation Group (Dry Cimarron): Romeroville Sandstone; Pajarito Formation; Mesa Rica Sandstone
- Underlies: Graneros Shale (sometimes included in the Colorado Group of the Great Plains or the Mancos Shale of the Southwest)
- Overlies: Precambrian (Sioux Quartzite), Permian, Early Cretaceous (Lytle), and Jurassic (Morrison Formation)

Lithology
- Primary: varying proportions of terrestrial sandstone, mudstone, and clay, with beds of shallow marine mud
- Other: marine shale, lignite, coal

Location
- Coordinates: 42.307°N 96.454°W
- Approximate paleocoordinates: 38.9°N 66.4°W
- Region: Great Plains, Rocky Mountains, Colorado Plateau, Rio Grande rift valley
- Country: United States, Canada

Type section
- Named for: Dakota City, Nebraska
- Named by: Meek and Hayden
- Year defined: 1862
- Dakota Formation (the United States) Dakota Formation (Nebraska)

The Dakota is a sedimentary geologic unit name of formation and group rank in Midwestern North America. The Dakota units are generally composed of sandstones, mudstones, clays, and shales deposited in the Mid-Cretaceous opening of the Western Interior Seaway. The usage of the name Dakota for this particular Albian-Cenomanian strata is exceptionally widespread; from British Columbia and Alberta to Montana and Wisconsin to Colorado and Kansas to Utah and Arizona. It is famous for producing massive colorful rock formations in the Rocky Mountains and the Great Plains of the United States, and for preserving both dinosaur footprints and early deciduous tree leaves.

Owing to extensive weathering of older rocks during the Jurassic and Triassic, the Dakota strata lie unconformably atop many different formations ranging in age from Precambrian to Early Cretaceous. With a few local exceptions, it is the oldest Cretaceous unit exposed in the northern Great Plains, including Kansas, Nebraska, Iowa, Minnesota, and Wisconsin, as well as the Desert Southwest. It generally consists of sandy, shallow marine or beach deposits with marine-influenced mudflat sediments, and occasional stream deposits.

== Naming and rank ==
F.B. Meek and F.V. Hayden first used Dakota in 1862 to name the distinctive red sandstone exposures along the Missouri River near Dakota City, Nebraska. But, with this name, they applied the term "group", which at that time had the meaning of formation rank, as presently used. Dakota Formation is the unit's primary name and rank in the Great Plains. Formation rank is also applied in western extents (e.g., northeast Utah) as the unit thins and exhibits formational characteristics, the marine shales are absent, and fossil pollen species correlate with those found in the unit on the Missouri River. In the San Juan Basin and other intermontane basins and plateaus of the Southwest, Dakota Sandstone is the formal name for the oldest Cretaceous sandstone as well as tongues of that terrestrial sandstone extending into the dark marine shales of the Mancos. However, Dakota Sandstone is everywhere a common informal name for the unit, especially for the sandstone beds.

The Dakota Group rank is employed along the territory of the Dakota Hogback in Colorado and Wyoming, the Colorado Plateau, the Dry Cimarron River, and the Denver Basin. This group ranking recognizes sequences and members that exhibit local formational characteristics, especially marine shales that are less developed or absent further from the center of the seaway. As these locations were at the time of formation the earliest and deepest areas of the seaway, these groups can include older ages of rocks than are usually included elsewhere under the Dakota name. The names of the member formations of the Dakota Group vary between these regions as the geology there is studied further; but, the earliest unit included in Dakota Groups, excluded elsewhere, is the terrestrial Lytle Formation, which is older than any other Cretaceous rock in Colorado or Kansas. The Skull Creek Shale and Plainview Sandstone of Colorado are also included in the Dakota Group, as is the Cedar Mountain Formation of Utah and its Buckhorn Conglomerate member. However, these units represent a separate seaway sequence in the time between the Lytle and "upper Dakota" (Mowry) sequences, and in the plains to the east, the same units are named Kiowa Shale and Cheyenne Sandstone, which are considered separate from the Dakota Formation as defined in Kansas and, moreover, do not appear at the type location in Nebraska. However, subsequent sequence stratigraphic and palynostratigraphic research has demonstrated that the Dakota Formation at the type location includes sand and mudstones covering the same ages and sequences as the "marine shale facies of the Graneros" and "early Late Albian Kiowa-Skull Creek".

In certain places, the classification is undivided; for example, in far southwest Utah, the strata is designated the Dakota Conglomerate without further division.

When nearer the surface (within a couple thousand feet/hundreds of meters), the sandstone beds of the Dakota Formation form various Dakota Aquifers, important water sources in some areas of the Great Plains and the Southwest, far greater in extent than the High Plains Aquifer, and famous for its artesian properties.

Elsewhere, when deeper, especially in the Denver Basin, these same sands have been sought after for hydrocarbon reserves. "Drillers", who navigate deep strata by monitoring material brought to the surface in the drilling mud, alphabetically designated the hydrocarbon "producing sands" of the Dakota in the Denver Basin as (highest) "D", "J", "M", and "O" (lowest). Colorado's "D" and "J" of the driller's Denver Basin have been particularly important to Nebraska, Kansas, and Oklahoma in their efforts of correlating their eastern outcrops with the Dakota units in the Denver Basin and the western units in general.

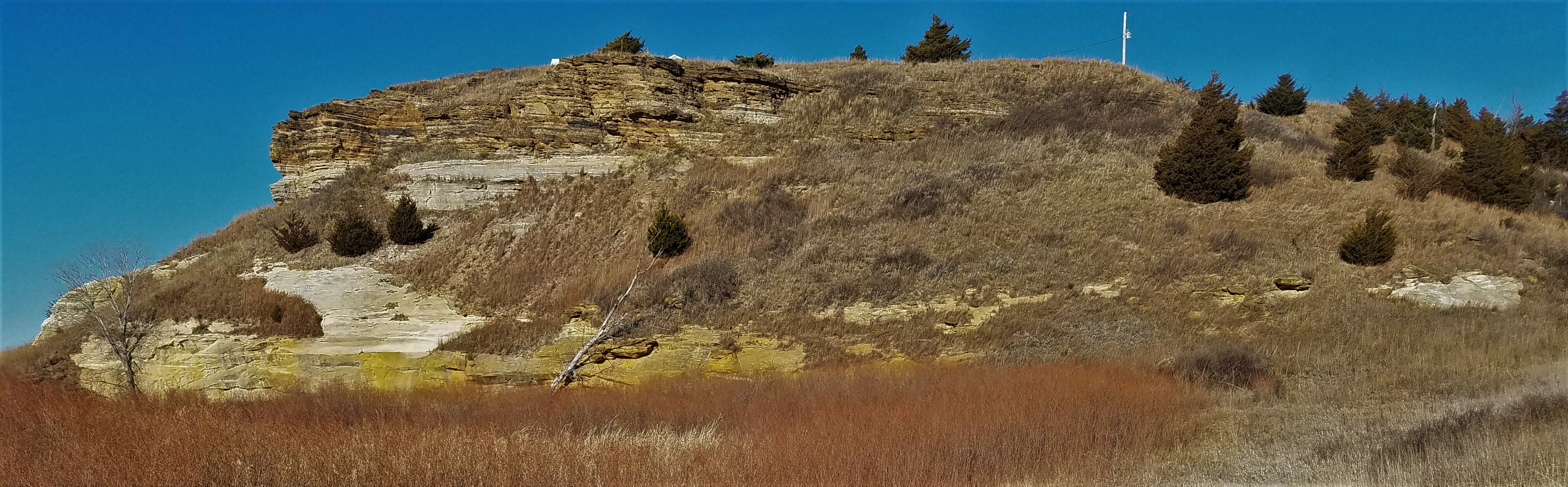
Dakota Formation in Central Kansas

== Geological history ==
Schematic reconstruction of the eastern side of the Cretaceous seaway during deposition of the sediments that eventually became the Dakota Formation. Erosional highlands occur in South Dakota and Minnesota.

Deposition of the sediments that would become the Dakota Formation began during the late Early Cretaceous (Albian). This deposition marked a reversal from over 100 million years of erosion (most of the Mesozoic). This reversal was due to rising of the mouth of the rivers, called a rise in base level, as the Cretaceous Seaway formed. This rise lowered the gradient of the rivers causing them to deposit sediment inland because their velocity could no longer sustain high volumes of sediment.

Measurements show that the rivers flowed westward and southwestward towards the encroaching sea from source areas near the present-day Great Lakes. The point of deposition slowly moved eastward as the seaway rose. This change is seen by a gradual shift in the composition of sandstones from having a lot of Paleozoic-age rock detritus in Kansas to sandstones having all Precambrian crystalline rock debris in Iowa.

This shift means that the rivers had completely eroded away the Paleozoic rocks in the river source area by the time the Seaway rose high enough for the rivers to deposit sediments in Iowa. The very top of the Dakota Formation was deposited along the coast as indicated by some fossil marine invertebrates. Fossil plants, coal deposits and kaolinite clays show that the climate was warm and wet during deposition of the Dakota Formation. Some of the ancient preserved soils show that an extensive flood plain forest was present.

== Western Interior Seaway sequences ==
This Cretaceous seaway experienced a number of geological sequences (rise and fall cycles of sea level relative to land elevation), which, during particular lowstands, temporarily reestablished a land connection between the east and west continent at the ancestral Transcontinental Arch. Each sequence represents a cycle of major progression of the seaway into the western interior of North America followed by retreat (see Walther's Law of Facies). The sequences of the seaway typically express facies sequences of, first, a low-stand erosional surface discontinuity (possibly with development of soils), then a transgressive pattern of terrestrial sand and mud followed by near shore marine sediments, a high stand pattern that may establish far-shore marine shale and limestone, a regressive pattern of a return to near shore marine sediments to terrestrial mud and sand, and a final low-stand erosional surface. Five of the first sequences of the Western Interior Seaway are relevant to the Dakota classifications.

The first sequence, typified by the Lytle Formation, did not complete the linkage of the north and south embayments before retreating. The second sequence is typified by the corresponding Skull Creek and Kiowa formations. These first two sequences are not present at the type area along the Missouri River. The sediments broadly considered as Dakota then record the Mowry sequence with the Muddy, J, or Lower Dakota sandstones and the D or Upper Dakota sandstones forming at the discontinuities at the beginning and end of that cycle. In the east the limited marine shales of the Mowry sequence are assigned to the Dakota Formation, while in the center the mudstones and marine shales are commonly assigned a separate unit between upper and lower sandstone units, and in the Southwest, the much thicker marine shales are assigned to tongues of the Lower Mancos. The Greenhorn Cycle is the final relevant sequence as it overlays all Dakota classifications, with the exception of certain sandstones of Graneros age, such as classified in Wisconsin and Iowa.

== Lithology ==
Over the range of the usage of the Dakota name, the unit is primarily known for its massive beds of sandstone, which commonly shows shades of red, but also gray, yellow, or white. The sand was carried and deposited by rivers or accumulated in dunes or shoreline strands, and later cemented by red iron oxide or white calcite, depending on the local groundwater conditions that followed the sedimentation. The degree of cementation can range from softly crumbling to resistant to hammering. The sandstone beds can have local conglomerations of gravel. The composition of the sand and gravel varies depending on the sources of the rivers that made each deposit.

The amount of sandstone, averaging 25-50%, can very greatly over short distances between extremes of 5% to 80%. The general remainder of the unit, however, generally in complementary 80% to 5% proportions, is layered mudstone and clay deposited on floodplains, swamps, and estuaries. Similar to the sand, the soil-forming mud was modified by groundwater conditions to accumulate iron oxide or calcite. Coloration can be dark to light red, grey, yellow, and white. Iron oxide accumulation can approach the hardness and luster of hematite.

In evidence of the general low-lying nature of the Dakota's lush, hot-house Earth environment, lignite and coal have formed in various areas.

Marine shale is also a part of the Dakota sequences. Less common in the remote extents, particularly in the east, the shale is more representative of the deeper portions of the inland seaway. Moreover, shales on top of the upper Dakota on the plains of the east are usually assigned to the Granola or equivalent units, while in the west the thickest interbedding "tongues" of shale are generally assigned to the lower Marcos. Nevertheless, near the western limits, where the Dakota "pinches out" between the Morrison and the Mowry, the unit returns to the totally terrestrial sand-mud-sand pattern and fossil pollens of the Nebraska type location.

These characteristics of chaotic, land-formed sandbanks and mudflats lying above flinty, whiter marine megacyclic Permian limestones and below grey, rhythmic, chalky shales, persist for thousands of miles, locally variable as they may be, causing common use of the name Dakota in spite of many efforts to apply localized names.

== Two sides of the seaway ==
Historically, Lower Cretaceous strata in the Rocky Mountain region have been called the Dakota Formation based on assumed correlation with the type section of the Dakota of the Great Plains. Witzke and Ludvigson have argued that use of the name "Dakota" must reflect actual, not presumed correlation based on stratigraphy and composition of the sedimentary rock. To the west of the Rocky Mountains, such as on the Colorado Plateau, this sequence of Upper Cretaceous, predominately sandstone, sedimentary rocks was recommended to be known as the Dakota Group, to dispel any suggestion of direct facies correlation. However, few authors of papers on the Dakota west of the Rocky Mountains, especially on the Colorado Plateau, recognize the Dakota as the Dakota Group, instead using the term Dakota Sandstone, of formation rank. Its subdivisions are recognized as members. Many authors have emphasized the fact that the marine Dakota Sandstone on the Colorado Plateau is intertongued with the marine lower part of the Mancos Shale, resulting in valid lithostratigraphic names such as the Whitewater Arroyo Tongue of the Mancos Shale which is directly overlain by the Twowells Sandstone Tongue of the Dakota Sandstone. In the western San Juan Basin, the lowermost part of the Dakota Sandstone, although of marginal marine origin in the eastern San Juan Basin, is a complex of non-marine sandstones. These relationships are especially well displayed in the San Juan Basin of northwestern New Mexico

Beginning in the Early Cretaceous, the Cretaceous Seaway spread south from what is now the Arctic Ocean and connected with a short northward extension from the Gulf of Mexico. This marine transgression of the ocean onto what was formerly land, was completed by the late Albian (~100 MA) thereby dividing North America in half. On the eastern side of the Seaway, sediments that would become the Dakota Formation were deposited as coastal and nearshore marine sands and silts. As the seaway continued to deepen and widen, this eastern shoreline moved progressively eastward; however, accumulation of abundant sediment delivered by massive rivers limited shoreline advancement past the type location throughout the Cenomanian until overtopped by the Greenhorn Seaway in the early Turonian. Meanwhile, on the western side of the seaway, sediments were carried eastwards and northeastwards by rivers from mountains located along what is the Nevada-Utah border.

These western sediments accumulated as nearshore and coastal sands and silts as well, and are counterparts to the Dakota Formation on the eastern side of the Seaway. However, these counterpart sediments originated from the other side of the sea and were carried by rivers flowing in opposite directions. These western sediments are equivalent to the Dakota Formation of the Great Plains, but are not exactly the same strata. Individual formations in the western Dakota Group have local names. In Wyoming, the term Cloverly Formation has been expanded by some authors to include sediments formerly placed within the Dakota Formation. Along the Colorado Front Range, the lower, terrestrial beds, or facies, of the Dakota Group are sometimes called the Lytle Formation, and near-shore marine facies are called the South Platte Formation. In eastern Utah and western Colorado, Young introduced the term Naturita Formation for a series of facies in the larger "Dakota Group". However, despite Witzke and Ludvigson logic, geologist have continued to refer to the Lower Cretaceous sequence of formations on the Colorado Plateau and the Rocky Mountains as the Dakota Group.

== Economic geology ==
The Dakota has provided several resources in the Plains states as well as in parts of the mountainous west.

The predominant shales and mudstones are a source of hydrocarbons while the lenses and channels of sandstone form exploitable hydrocarbon reserves. Thus, the Dakota Group is an oil and gas source in the Denver Basin.

When they are near the surface, these same structures function as aquitards and aquifers, respectively. The Dakota sandstones form crucial supplies of water on the Plains, especially on uplands between river valleys wherever it is found outside the boundaries of the Ogallala Aquifer.

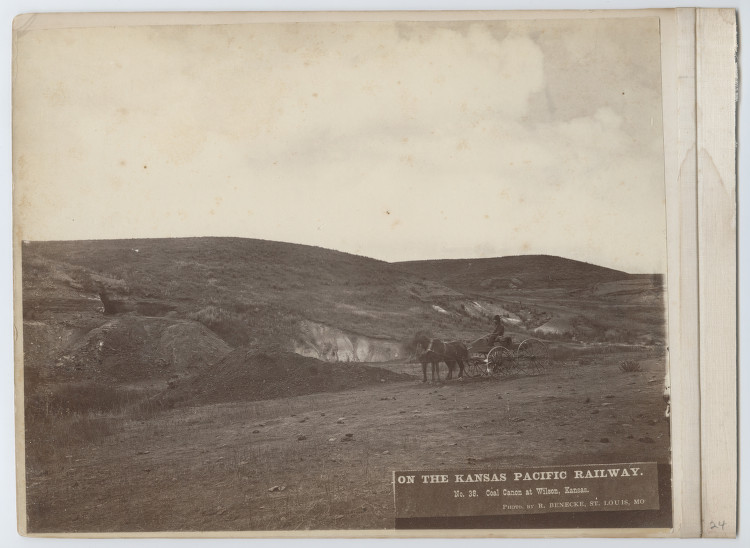
Lignite coal seam and mine, Wilson, Kansas, 1873

As the formation is uniquely terrestrial in origin, in contrast to the vast marine formations of the Plains, the Dakota has additional unique resources. Lignite coal has formed in the unit and was mined briefly in the 19th century. This supply was immediately mined for fuel by early American settlers, but was decidedly inferior to larger supplies of coal in the southeast of Kansas. The widespread bog environments of the Dakota period resulted in concretions of iron, forming hematite, limonite, and beds of "ironstone", which are common in the Janssen clay member of Kansas. Smelting of this limited iron source was only briefly attempted in conjunction with the lignite mining. The iron-cemented sandstone was found to be a durable and colorful building material on the treeless 19th century Plains. Historic 1860s buildings of Fort Harker (Kansas) and Fort Larned are constructed of this stone. The Dakota clays are quarried for tile and brick manufacture.

Uranium is also found concentrated in the Dakota sandstone where percolating uranium-rich water has deposited the mineral in the aquifers.

== Paleoenvironment ==
The sands and muds of the Dakota represent wet lowlands, rivers, flood plains, and beaches with a shoreline deeply undulating between deltas and brackish marine embayments. Ground water flowing from inland reacted with changes in pH, oxygenation, and salinity as it encountered seawater, depositing iron oxide and calcite in underground layers near shorelines. These minerals hardened the material and fossils to preserve evidence of the ecology of those environments. Sandstone with dinosaur tracks in the upper Dakota above the marine Skull Creek Shale near Denver demonstrates that the seaway occasionally retreated from the area.

Dakota Fossils of Land Environments
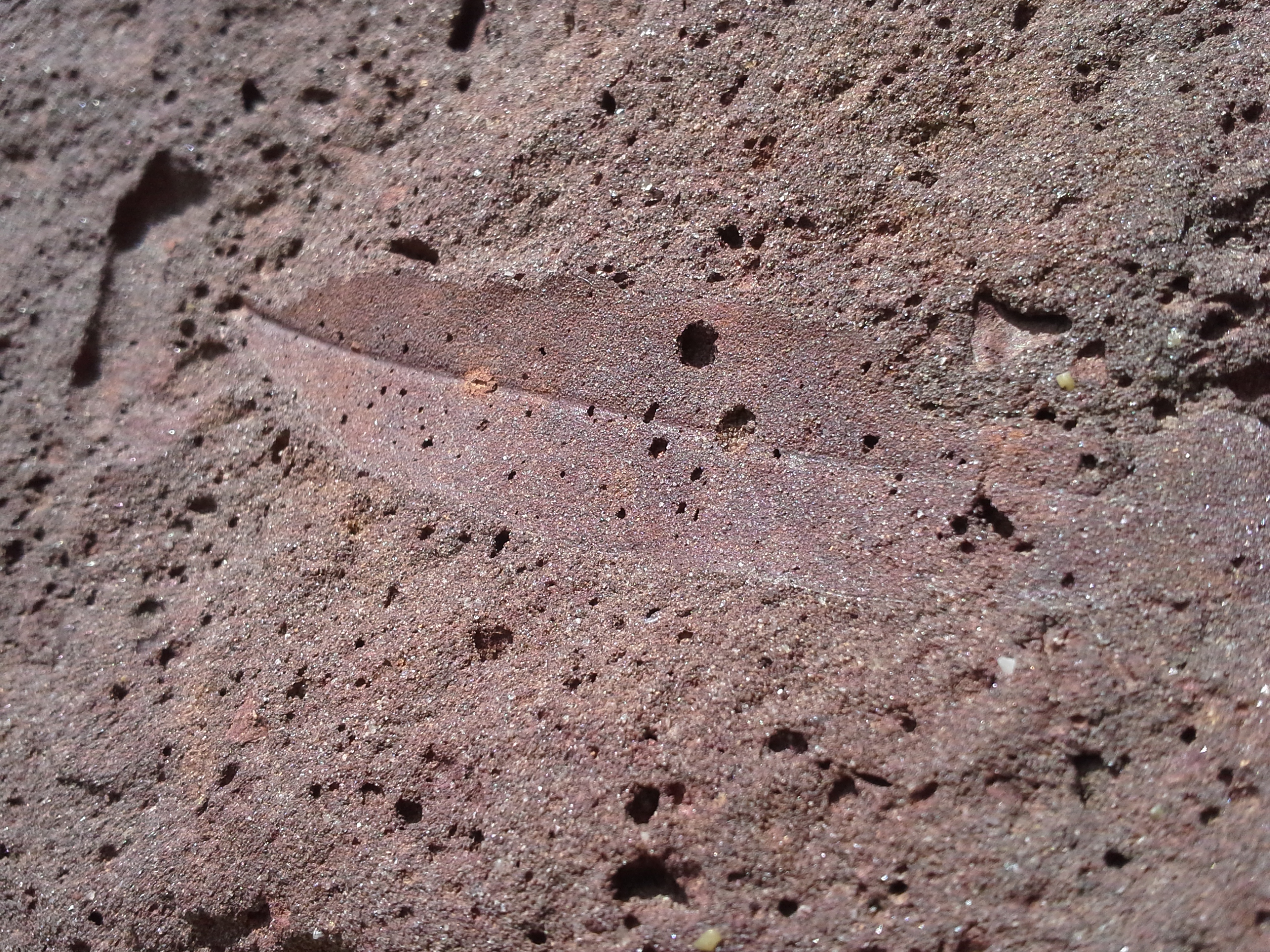
Iron-cemented leaf imprint (Ellis County, Kansas); evidence of boggy sand near deciduous trees

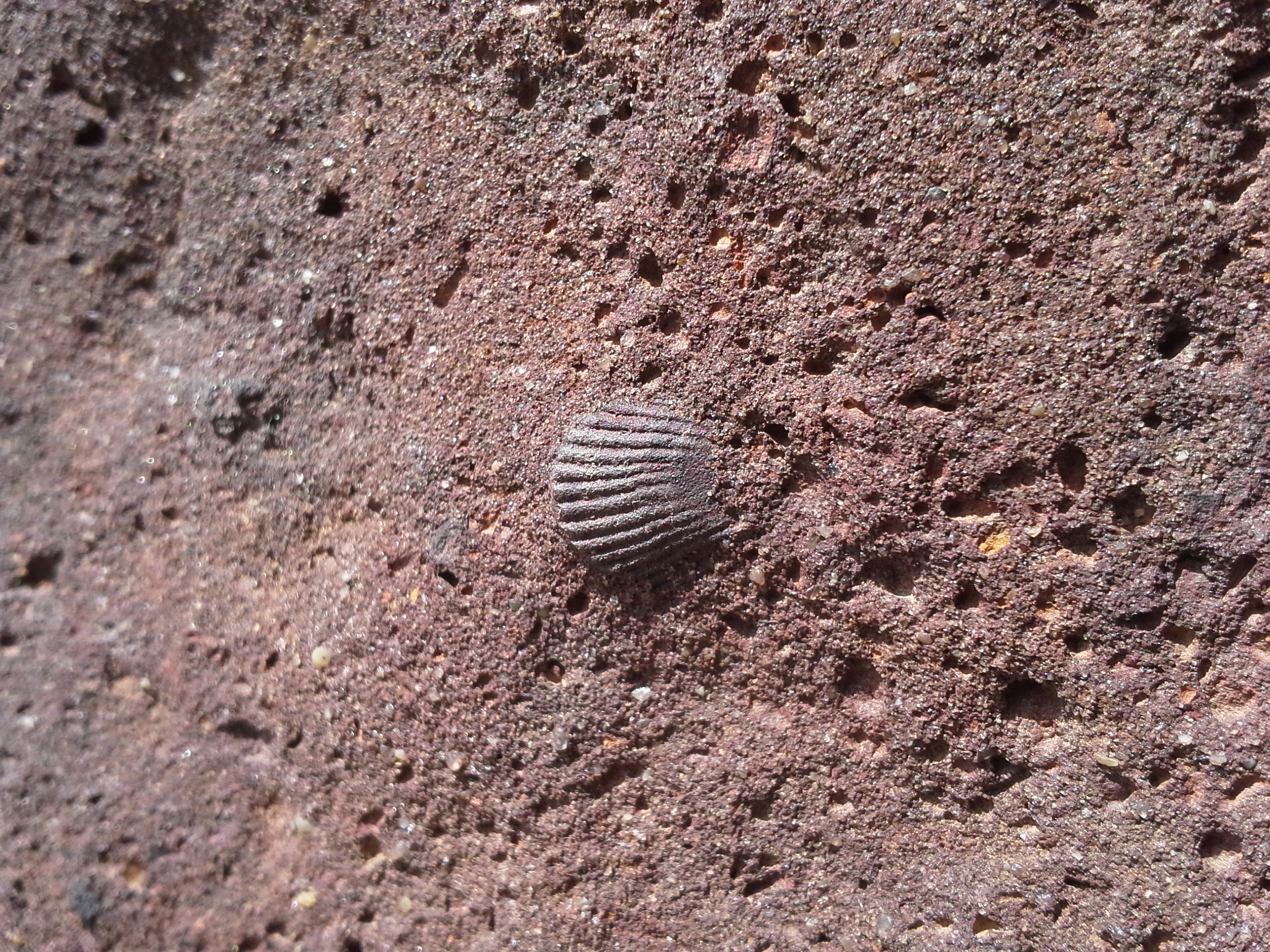
Marine mollusk shell (Ellis County, Kansas); evidence of sandy wave-washed beach

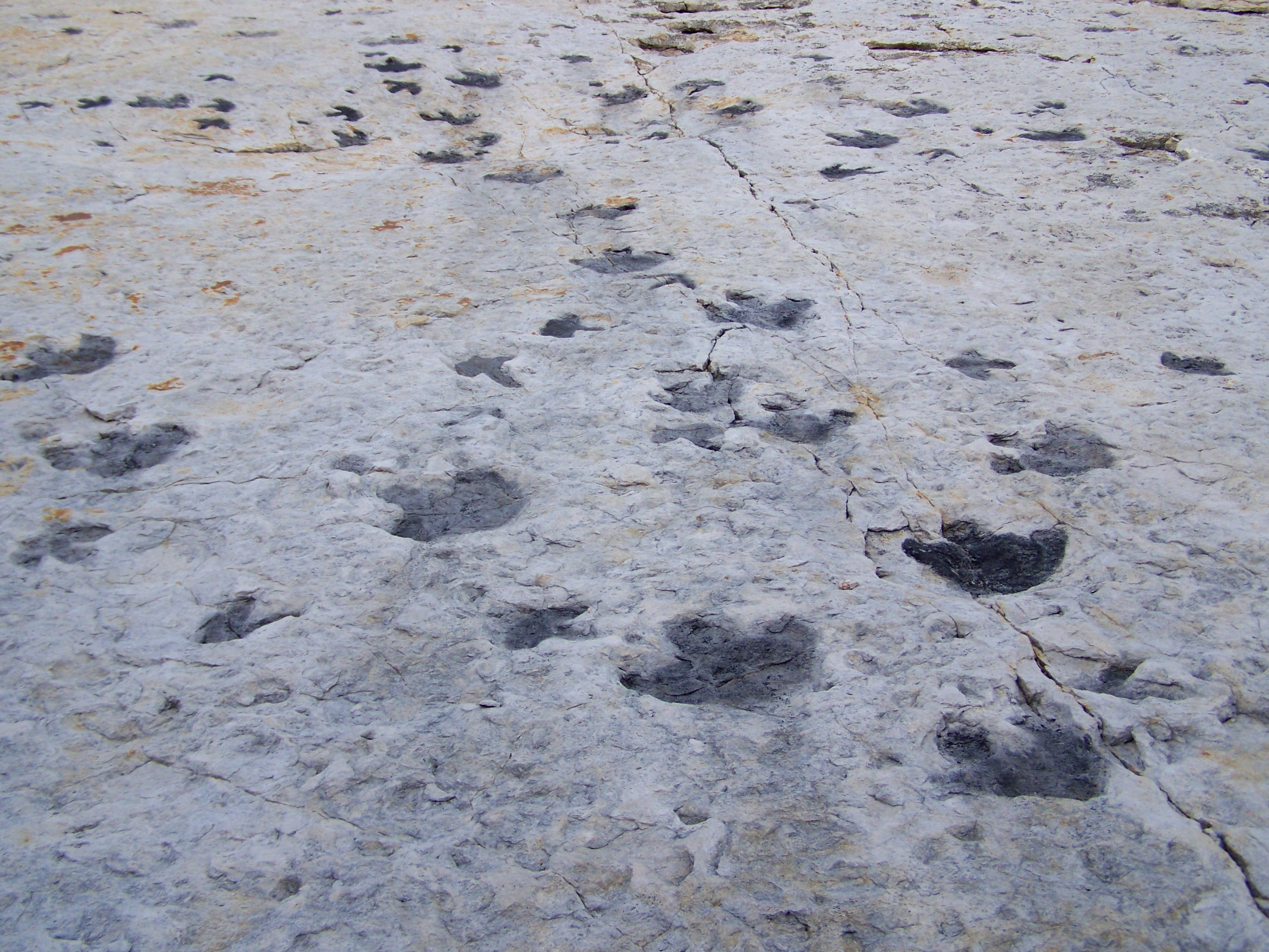
Dinosaur beach tracks (Dinosaur Ridge); temporary, wide land bridge across the seaway

=== Vertebrate paleofauna ===
Dinosaur fossils are very rare in the Dakota Formation and most of them come from Kansas. Some of them are found in Colorado and Nebraska. The most popular site for public viewing of Cretaceous dinosaur fossils in Colorado is Dinosaur Ridge. The best specimen is a partial skeleton of a nodosaurid ankylosaur called Silvisaurus condrayi. Other isolated ankylosaur material may also belong to Silvisaurus. Fossil dinosaur tracks are also known and include theropod and ankylosaur. A large ornithopod femur is known from Burt County, Nebraska as well as fossil dinosaur tracks from Jefferson County. Goniopholidids are also found here with Dakotasuchus kingi.

- cf. Troodon sp
- cf. Paronychodon (? troodontid indet)
- cf. Richardoestesia sp. (theropod indet)
- ? Barosaurus lentus
- Silvisaurus condrayi – "Partial skeleton with skull, sacrum."
- Dakotasuchus kingi - a goniopholidid.

==== Pterosaurs ====
Pterosaurs of the Dakota Formation
Taxon	Presence	Description	Images
Suborder: Pterodactyloidea; 1. Tracks	Known from both early and late Cretaceous strata in the Dakota Group. Found at the John Martin Reservoir in Colorado.	Specimens kept at the Dinosaur Tracks Museum, of the University of Colorado at Denver.	

=== Plant fossils ===
Angiosperms
Genus	Species	Presence	Material	Notes	Images
Anisodromum	A. wolfei	Rose Creek Locality, Nebraska.	3 specimens.	A rosid.	
Anisodromum	A. upchurchii	Hoisington III locality, Kansas.	4 specimens.	A rosid.	
Anisodromum	A. schimperi	Hoisington III locality, Kansas.	2 specimens.	A rosid.	
Archaeanthus	A. linnenbergeri	Central Kansas.			
Aspidiophyllum	A. denticulatum	Braun Ranch Locality, Kansas.	2 specimens.		
Aquatifolia	A. fluitans	Hoisington III locality, Kansas.	75 specimens.	An aquatic angiosperm, possibly related to extant Nymphaeaceae.	
Brasenites	B. kansense	Hoisington III locality, Kansas.	4 specimens.	An aquatic angiosperm, may be related to extant Cabombaceae.	
Citrophyllum	C. aligera	Hoisington III locality, Kansas.	6 specimens.	A rosid.	
Crassidenticulum	C. decurrens	Rose Creek Locality, Nebraska; Braun Ranch and Hoisington III localities, Kansas.	2 specimens, UF15706-24648, from Hoisington III; 125 specimens from Braun Ranch.	A chloranthale	
Crassidenticulum	C. landisae	Braun Ranch Locality, Kansas.	13 specimens.	A chloranthale	
Crassidenticulum	C. trilobum	Braun Ranch and Hoisington III localities, Kansas.	1 specimen from Hoisington III; 58 specimens from Braun Ranch.	A chloranthale	
Crassidenticulum	cf. C. trilobum	Hoisington III locality, Kansas.	1 specimen.	Possibly a variant of C. trilobum.	
Credneria	C. cyclophylla	Hoisington III locality, Kansas and Courtland I locality, Minnesota.	3 specimens.	A platanaceae.	
Credneria	C. quadrata	Braun Ranch Locality, Kansas.	1 specimen.	A platanaceae	
Dicotylophyllum	D. braunii	Braun Ranch Locality, Kansas.	1 specimen.		
Dicotylophyllum	D. fragile	Braun Ranch Locality, Kansas.	1 specimen.		
Dicotylophyllum	D. huangii	Braun Ranch Locality, Kansas.	2 specimens.		
Dicotylophyllum	D. leptovenum	Hoisington III locality, Kansas.	1 specimen		
Dicotylophyllum	D. skogii	Hoisington III locality, Kansas.	1 specimen.		
Dischidus	D. quinquelobus	Braun Ranch Locality, Kansas.	1 specimen.	A plane tree	
Distefananthus	D. hoisingtonensis	Hoisington III locality, Barton County, Kansas.	Inflorescence.	Flowers of a plane tree, may represent the same species as Sapindopsis powelliana.	
Eoplatanus	E. serrata	Braun Ranch Locality, Kansas.	480 leaves and 238 specimens with associated infructescences.	A plane tree	
Glandilunatus	G. kansense	Braun Ranch Locality, Kansas.	1 specimen.		
Hickeyphyllum	H. imhofii	Braun Ranch Locality, Kansas.	1 specimen.		
Hickeyphyllum	H. sandersii	Braun Ranch Locality, Kansas.	5 specimens.		
Jarzenia	J. kanbrasota	Hoisington III locality, Kansas and Courtland I locality, Minnesota.	2 specimens.	A magnoliale.	
Kladoneuron	K. gooleria	Braun Ranch Locality, Kansas.	1 specimen.		
Landonia	L. callii	Braun Ranch Locality, Kansas.	1 specimen.	A laurale	
Liriophyllum	L. kansense	Linnenberger Ranch and Hoisington III localities, Kansas.	30 specimens.	A magnoliale.	
Longstrethia	L. aspera	Hoisington III locality, Kansas.	2 specimens.		
Pabiania	P. variloba	Rose Creek locality, Nebraska and Hoisington III locality, Kansas.	90 specimens.	A laurale.	
Paleonelumbo	P. cf. macroloba	Hoisington III locality, Kansas.	1 specimen.		
Rodgersia	R. dakotensis	Hoisington III locality, Kansas and Courtland I locality, Minnesota.	200 specimens.	A laurale	
Rodgersia	R. parlatorii	Braun Ranch and Hoisington III localities, Kansas.	2 specimens from Hoisington III, 195 specimens from Braun Ranch.		
Rodgersia	R. lottii	Braun Ranch Locality, Kansas.	1 specimen.		
Sapindopsis	S. powelliana	Hoisington III locality, Kansas.	110 specimens	A platanaceae, may represent the leaves of Distefananthus hoisingtonensis.	
Sapindopsis	S. retallackii	Hoisington III locality, Kansas.	30 specimens.	A platanaceae	
Trochodendroides	T. elliptica	Braun Ranch Locality, Kansas.	3 specimens.		
Wingia	W. expansolobum	Rose Creek locality, Nebraska.	52 specimens.	Originally described as Dicotylophyllum expansolobum.	
Wingia	W. cf. expansolobum	Hoisington III locality, Kansas.	2 specimens.	2 specimen differing from W. expansolobum in having smaller leaves, thinner secondary veins, a pair of distinctive secondary veins originating from the extreme base of the leaf lamina and running parallel to the primary veins for almost half the lobe length, semi-craspedodromous secondary venation, and a predominantly toothed margin.	
Wolfiophyllum	W. pfaffianum	Hoisington III locality, Kansas and Courtland I locality, Minnesota.		A laurel.	
Wolfiophyllum	W. heigii	Braun Ranch Locality, Kansas.	17 specimens.		
Wolfiophyllum	W. daphneoides	Braun Ranch Locality, Kansas.	4 specimens.		
Yangia	Y. glandifolia	Braun Ranch Locality, Kansas.	2 specimens.	A laurale	

Quillworts
Genus	Species	Presence	Material	Notes	Images
Isoetites	I. phyllophila	Hoisington III locality, Kansas.	Rhizome.		

Ferns
Genus	Species	Presence	Material	Notes	Images
Anemia	A. dakotensis	Hoisington III locality, Kansas.	Leaf.		
Anemia	A. dicksoniana	Hoisington III locality, Kansas.			
Gleichenia	G. camptoniaefolia	Hoisington III locality, Kansas.			
Gleichenia	G. delicatula	Hoisington III locality, Kansas.			
Marsilea	M. johnhallii	Hoisington III locality, Kansas.			
Matonidium	M. brownii	Hoisington III locality, Kansas.			

Conifers
Genus	Species	Presence	Material	Notes	Images
?Athrotaxites	?A. sp. B	Hoisington III locality, Kansas.			
Brachyphyllum	B. crassum	Hoisington III locality, Kansas.	Leaf.		
Geinitzia	G. sp.	Hoisington III locality, Kansas.			
Peltaconus	P. conditus	Hoisington III locality, Kansas.	Seed cone.		
Pinus	P. sp.	Hoisington III locality, Kansas.	Leaf (needle remains).		
?Pityanthus		Hoisington III locality, Kansas.	Pollen cone.		

== See also ==
- List of dinosaur-bearing rock formations
- Dinosaur Ridge is located west of Denver, Colorado
- Dakota Hogback
