= Cheyenne Sandstone =

Geologic formation in Kansas, US

- Stratigraphic range: Early Cretaceous
- Type: Formation
- Unit of: Lower Cretaceous Series
- Underlies: Kiowa Shale
- Overlies: Permian units and Morrison Formation
- Thickness: 0–260 ft (0.00–79.25 m)

Location
- Coordinates: 37°27′1″N 99°4′48″W
- Region: Kansas
- Country: United States

Type section
- Named for: Cheyenne Rock, at Belvidere, Kiowa Co., central southern Kansas
- Named by: F. W. Cragin
- Year defined: 1889

The Cheyenne Sandstone is an Early Cretaceous geologic formation in Kansas.

== See also ==
- List of fossiliferous stratigraphic units in Kansas
- Paleontology in Kansas
