= Skull Creek Shale =

- Stratigraphic range: Albian around 101–97 Ma
- Type: Formation

Lithology
- Primary: shale

Location
- Region: Nebraska
- Country: United States

The Skull Creek Shale is a Cretaceous geologic formation in Wyoming as well as Colorado and Nebraska, United States.

The Skull Creek Shale corresponds with the Kiowa Shale.

== See also ==
- List of fossiliferous stratigraphic units in Colorado
- List of fossiliferous stratigraphic units in Nebraska
- List of fossiliferous stratigraphic units in Wyoming
- Paleontology in Colorado
- Paleontology in Nebraska
- Paleontology in Wyoming
