= Morrison Natural History Museum =

Natural history museum located in Morrison, Colorado, USA

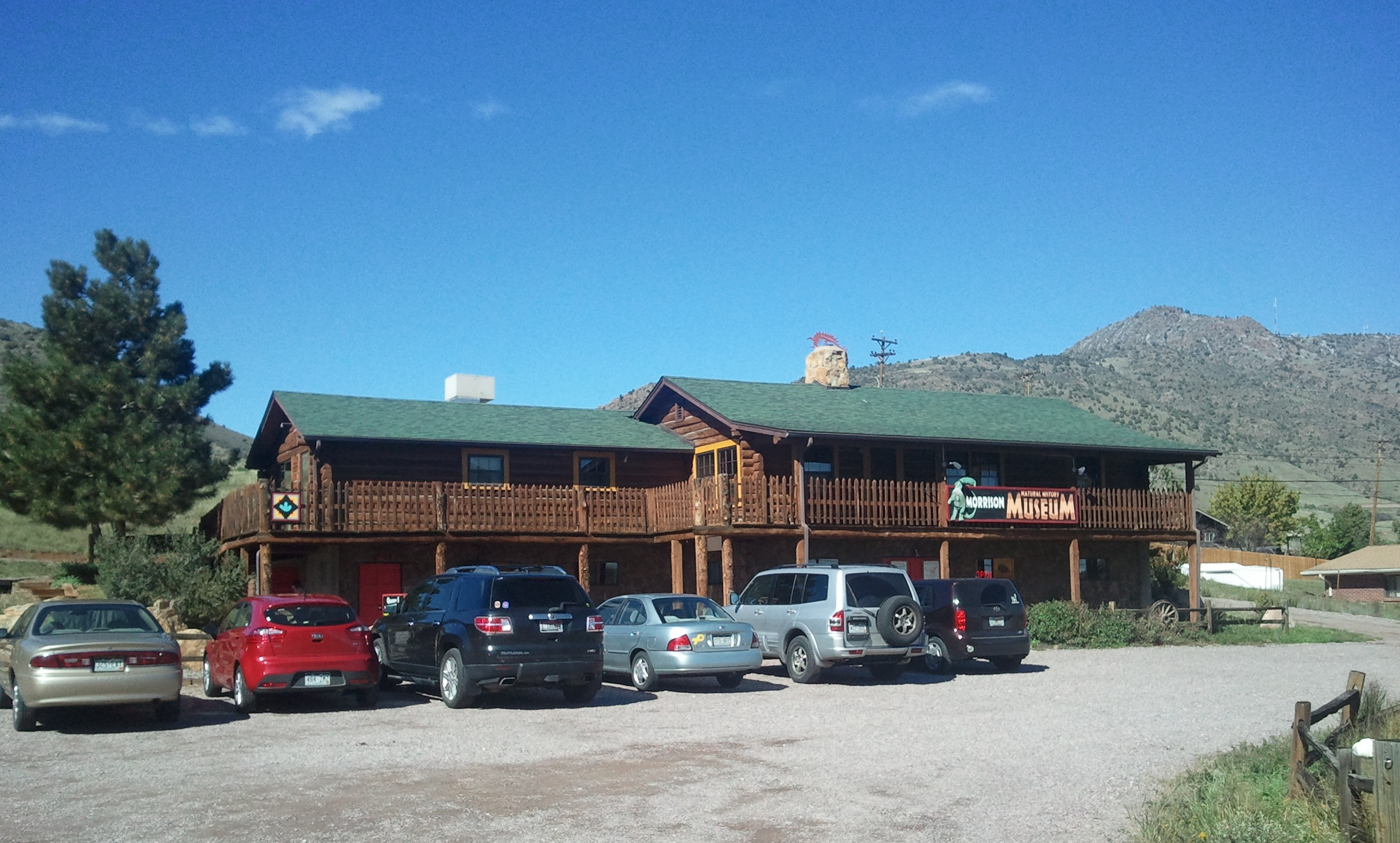
- Established: 1989
- Location: 501 Colorado Highway 8, Morrison, Colorado
- Coordinates: 39.649088°N 105.193559°W
- Visitors: 11,000
- Director: Matthew T. Mossbrucker
- Website: mnhm.org

The Morrison Natural History Museum is a natural history museum located in Morrison, Colorado. The exhibits include several dinosaur fossils that were found nearby. Hands-on exhibits are designed to appeal to both children and adults, scientists and non-scientists.

== History ==
The Museum opened in 1989 and has been operated by the Town of Morrison since 1995. Financial support comes from visitor's admission fees, gift shop sales, grants, and private donations.

== Exhibits ==
On the lower level, the Museum houses exhibits devoted to local paleontology and Jurassic fossils. On the upper level, exhibits focus on Cretaceous and Cenozoic fossils. A rock garden and fossil dig pit are found outside the building.

Notable displays include skulls of Tyrannosaurus, Triceratops, and Tylosaurus, remains of skeletons of Stegosaurus and Pteranodon, and infant dinosaur tracks. Live reptiles and amphibians are also on display.

The Museum includes a paleontology lab where fossils are prepared for exhibits and scientific research.
