= Glencairn Formation =

Geological formation in Colorado and New Mexico, USA

- Stratigraphic range: Albian
- Type: Formation
- Unit of: Purgatoire Group
- Underlies: Dakota Group
- Overlies: Lytle Formation
- Thickness: 10–145 feet (3.0–44.2 m)

Lithology
- Primary: Shale
- Other: Sandstone

Location
- Coordinates: 38.517°N 104.972°W
- Region: Colorado; New Mexico
- Country: United States

Type section
- Named for: Small tract of land north of Lytle, Colorado (sec 2, T17S, R68W)
- Named by: G.I. Finlay
- Year defined: 1916
- Glencairn Formation (the United States) Glencairn Formation (Colorado)

The Glencairn Formation is a geologic formation found in Colorado and New Mexico. It preserves fossils characteristic of the Albian Age of the Cretaceous Period.

== Description ==
The Glencairn Formation consists of dark gray shale and buff sandstone and siltstone. It disconformably overlies the Lytle Formation, underlies the Dakota Group, and varies in thickness from 10–145 feet (3.0–44.2 m). The formation is present from central Colorado to the valley of the Dry Cimarron in northeastern New Mexico. The formation locally contains gypsum veins and gypsum-filled desiccation cracks.

The exposures at the valley of the Dry Cimarron include a basal sandstone bed, the Long Canyon Sandstone Bed, that is up to 3 meters (9.8 ft) thick, is heavily bioturbated, and contains an abundant late Albian invertebrate fossil fauna. This is interpreted as infilling of a drainage system preceding the Kiowa-Skull Creek transgression. It is likely the lateral equivalent of the Tucumcari Shale.

== Fossils ==
The lower beds of the formation are heavily bioturbated and contain abundant fossils of the gryphaeid oyster Texigryphea. The upper beds locally contain petrified plant material. The formation also contains ammonoids, including Goodhallites, Idiohamites, and Engonoceras uddeni, and associated solitary corals, bivalves, and gastropods

== History of investigation ==
The formation was first named as the Glencairn shale member of the now abandoned Purgatoire Formation by G.I. Finlay in 1916, for exposures near Lytle, Colorado. Waage subsequently traced the unit into northeastern New Mexico, where it has been raised to formation rank.
