= Dinosaur Ridge =

Natural heritage site in Colorado, United States

- Ridge
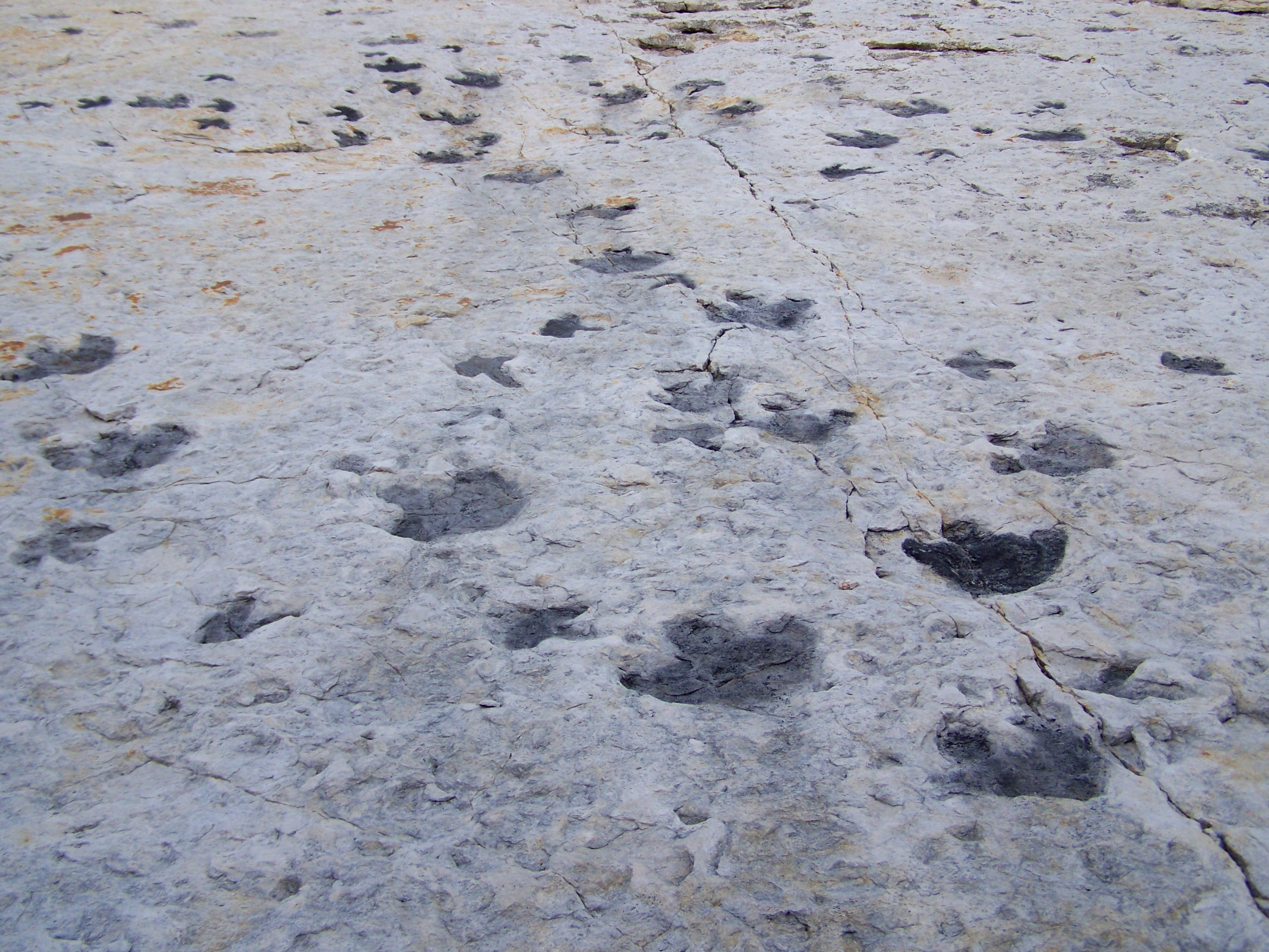
- Tracks on Dinosaur Ridge

- Location within Colorado
- Coordinates: 39.6757°N 105.1934°W
- Location: Dinosaur Ridge, part of the Golden-Morrison Fossil Areas National Natural Landmark, Jefferson County, Colorado, United States
- Part of: Dakota Hogback
- Age: Cretaceous and Jurassic

Dinosaur Ridge is a segment of the Dakota Hogback in the Morrison Fossil Area National Natural Landmark located in Jefferson County, Colorado, near the town of Morrison and just west of Denver.

In 1877 Arthur Lakes, a clergyman, teacher, and amateur paleontologist from Golden, CO, and Henry Beckwith, a retired naval officer, discovered the first ever dinosaur material in the Morrison Formation at Dinosaur Ridge. The same year, excavation began under the direction of Yale paleontologist Dr. Othniel Charles Marsh. The first identified Stegosaurus fossils in the world were discovered here, and fossil bones found in the layers of rock here represent some well-known dinosaurs, including Apatosaurus, Camarasaurus, Diplodocus, and Allosaurus. In 1973, the area was recognized as an outstanding example of the nation's natural heritage, and was designated a National Natural Landmark by the National Park Service. The area was expanded in June 2011, and combined with another tracksite in Golden at the Parfet Prehistoric Preserve. These two sites, along with a few other nearby fossil sites in Golden, were combined, and the National Natural Landmark is now known as the Morrison-Golden Fossil Areas. In 1989, the Friends of Dinosaur Ridge non-profit was formed to address concerns regarding the preservation of the site and to offer educational programs on the area's resources.

The rocks on the west side of Dinosaur Ridge are part of the widespread Morrison Formation of Jurassic age. It is in these rocks where Arthur Lakes discovered dinosaur bones in 1877. Subsequently, several quarries were excavated along the Dakota hogback in the Morrison area in search of more fossils. Evidence of a variety of dinosaur genera and species was found here, as well as fossils identified to be from prehistoric turtles and lungfish. Research is ongoing.

The rocks on the east side of Dinosaur Ridge are part of the Cretaceous Dakota Formation. When Alameda Parkway was being constructed in 1937 (by the WPA) in order to provide access to Red Rocks Park and Amphitheatre, workers discovered dinosaur tracks. As those footprints were damaged and destroyed over time, more tracks were intentionally uncovered in later decades. These were found to include mostly Iguanodon-like footprints, perhaps from an ornithopod dinosaur called Eolambia. Omnivorous bird-like ornithomimid tracks, crocodilian tracks, and large carnivorous theropod tracks are also present.

The site offers guided bus tours, interpretive signage, a small Exhibit Hall with geological and paleontological displays, and a gift shop. On the West side of the hogback is the Martin G. Lockley Discovery Center, an interactive exhibit also owned by Friends of Dinosaur Ridge. Dinosaur Ridge's interpretive signs at trail locations explain the local geology, paleo-ecology, trace fossils, bone fossils, economic development of coal, oil, and clay, and many other geologic and paleontological features.

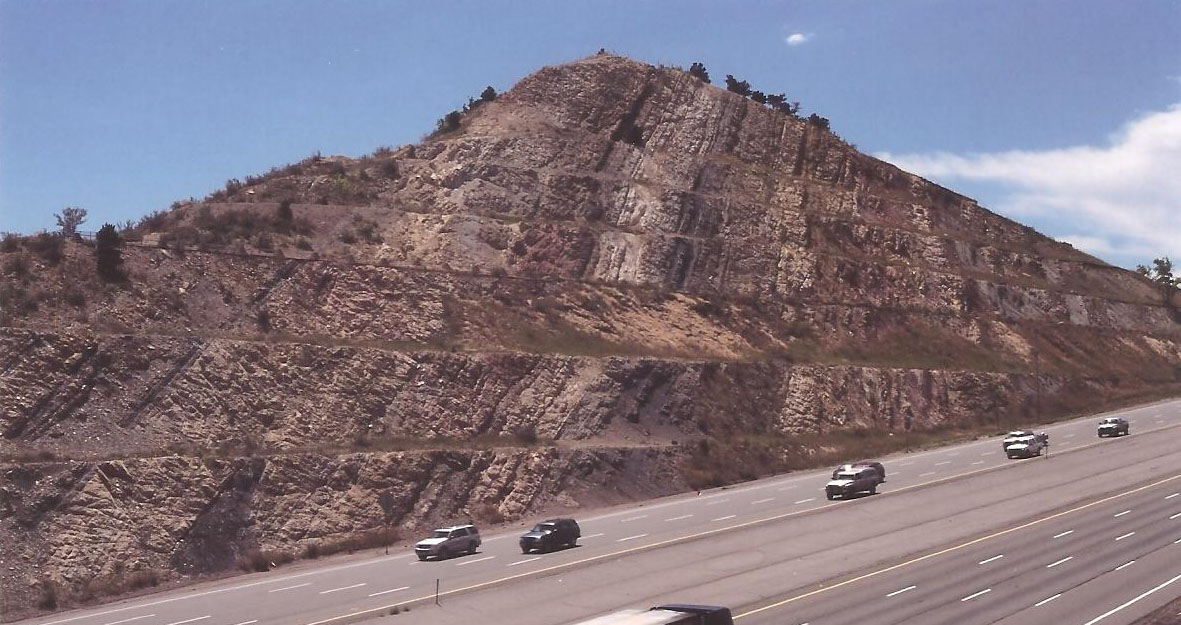
Road cut where I-70 cuts through Dinosaur Ridge

== Dinosaur Ridge Trail ==
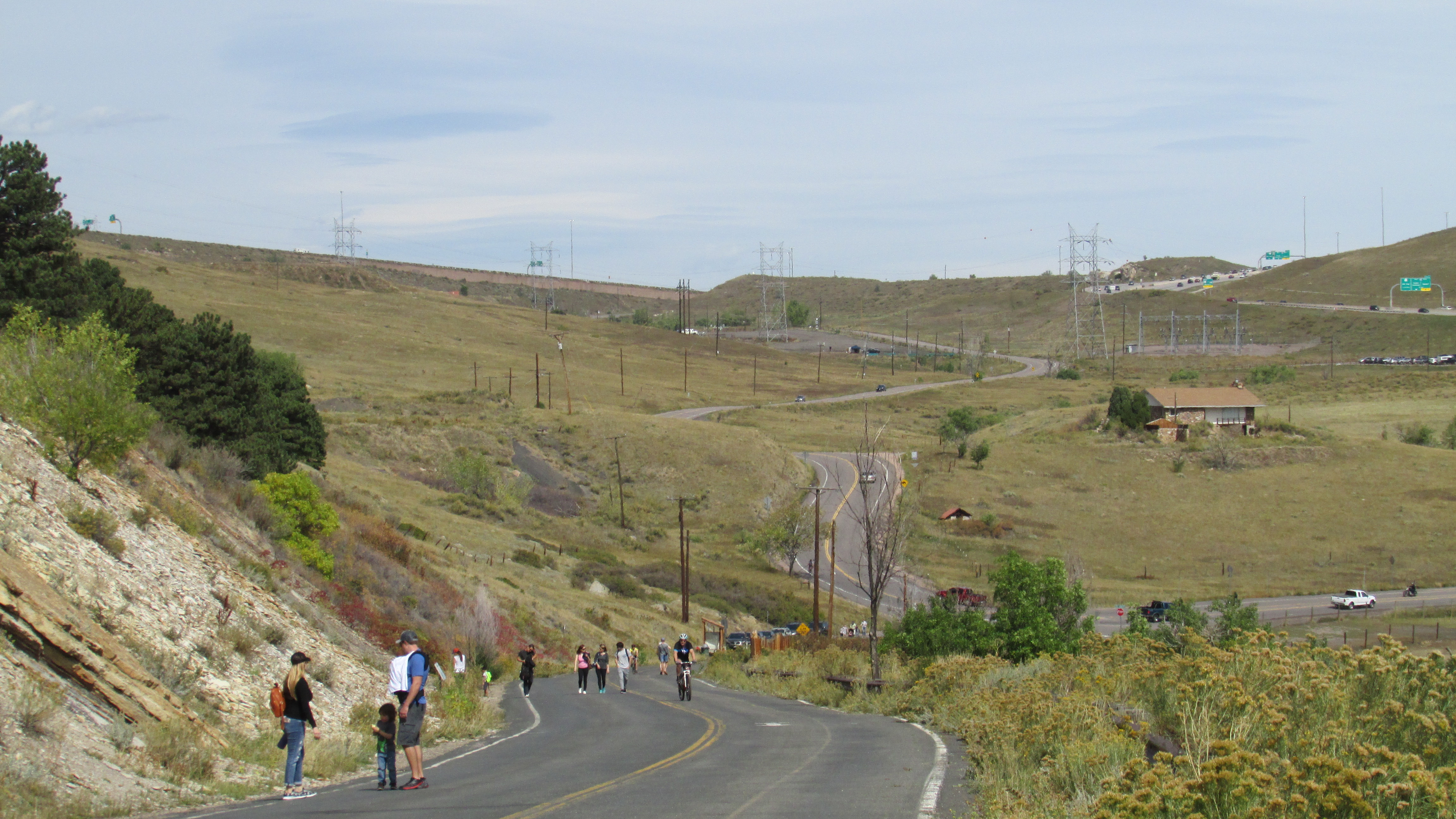
Pedestrian & bike only access to Dinosaur Ridge, Colorado. Visitors may also choose to take a guided bus tour.

The outdoor exhibits are located along a closed section of West Alameda Parkway. This trail follows a paved closed road that climbs about 700 feet (210 m) from the main visitor center to the high point along the ridge backbone. The walk is about 2 miles (3.2 km) round-trip, taking approximately 1 1/2 to 2 hours. The Exhibit Hall is near the main visitor center and a fully guided bus tour is available.

- Exhibit Hall and Main Visitor Center (elevation 5,975 feet (1,821 m))
- Golden Fault
- Benton Shale
- Western Interior Seaway - During the Cretaceous Period this was the bottom sediment of the Western Interior Seaway.
- Dakota Sandstone - During the Cretaceous Period this was the shore of the Western Interior Seaway. The build-up of soils from the coastal plains created the Dakota Group.
- Dinosaur Courtship
- Ripple Marks – Ripple marks form on the sandy bottoms of water feature because of wave motion or currents. The direction of the water is perpendicular or across the ridges.
- Slimy Beach – A mat of microorganisms formed on a tidal flat that was flooded during extremely high tides. At some point, the area was rapidly buried starting a process of fossilization. The gray surfaces were fully developed mats. Depressed areas have been degraded by an outside force, such as a dinosaur's footprint. Additional degradation from water currents are shown by the ripple marks.
- Dinosaur Tracks - From the footprints found here, it is possible to glean information about the lives and behaviors of the animals that lived here. These Ornithopods, i.e., Iguanodon, or Eolambia, were quadrupedal, with bipedal tracks from smaller individuals (juveniles). The tracks show that these dinosaurs lacked claws on their feet, and their rounded toes indicate a diet of plants. The presence of 18 inches (46 cm) tracks adjacent to 10 inches (25 cm) prints is taken as evidence of parenting behavior.
- Trace Fossils The exposure of Dakota Sandstone reveals numerous 'trace fossils'. These are fossils that appear as irregularities of the rock. They are actually the remnants of animal burrows and marine plants.

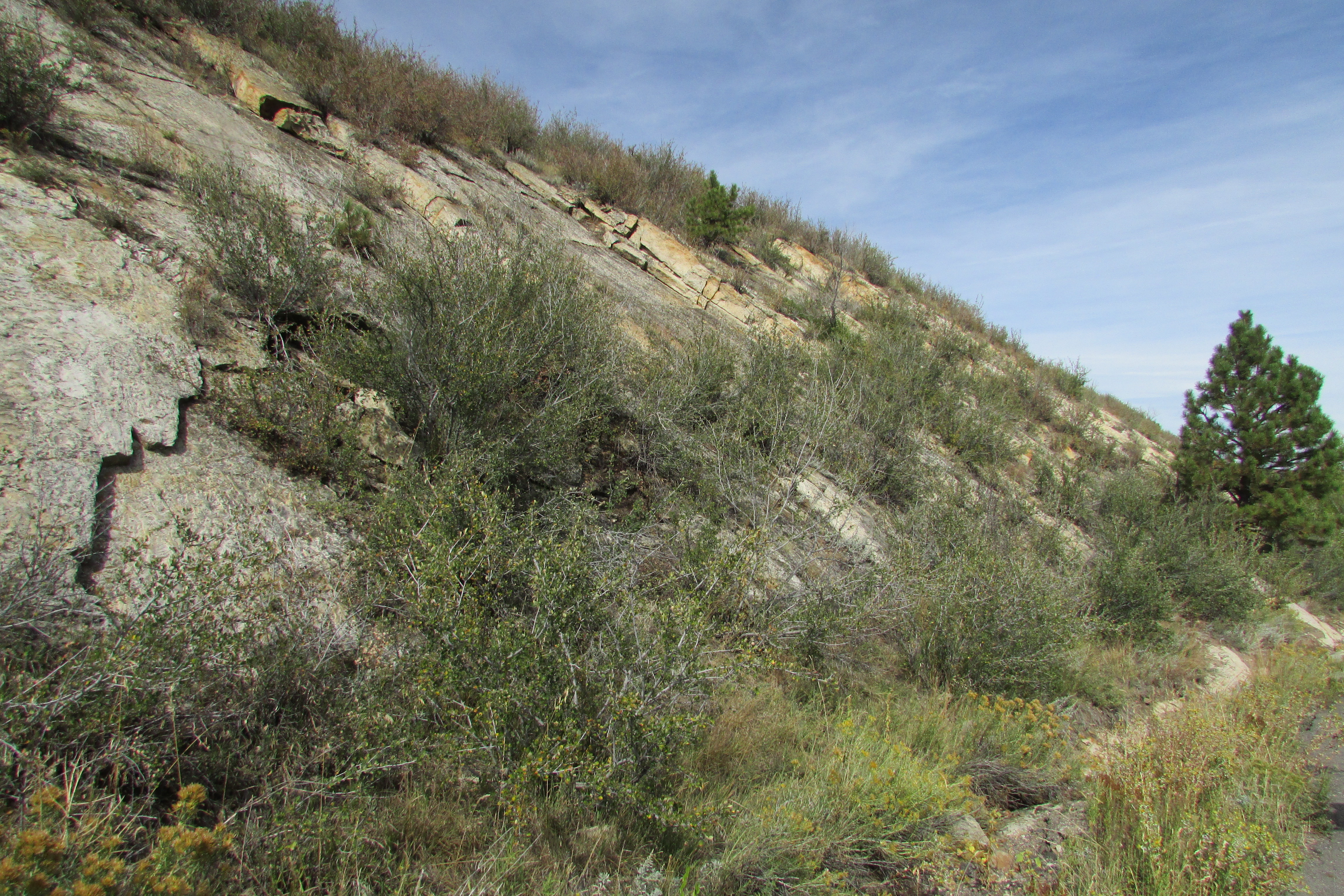
Cinquefoil (Potentilla diversifolia) along Dinosaur Ridge, Golden-Morrison Fossil Areas National Natural Landmark, Colorado.

- Ecology The hogback is a transitional zone between the Rocky Mountains and the High Plains. Plants and animals from both areas can be found. Among the plants are Mountain mahogany, junipers, sumacs, Gambel's oak and a few Ponderosa pines. The dominant mammals are the mule deer, rock squirrel, and foxes. Scrub jays and magpies are the representative birds. During spring migration, over 2,000 raptors pass northwards along the ridge.
- Hogback (elevation 6,175 feet (1,882 m)) – The ridge is part of the Dakota Hogback, paralleling the front range of the Rocky Mountains. The term hogback is a reference to a similarity to the back of an Arkansas razorback hog. A harder layer of resistant rock forms the ‘backbone’ or ‘hogback’. Here, it is Dakota sandstone. Softer layers above erode, leaving the backbone rising above the surrounding landscape. Softer layers below the Dakota sandstone form an escarpment in the older layers below.
- Denver Basin/Oil and Gas
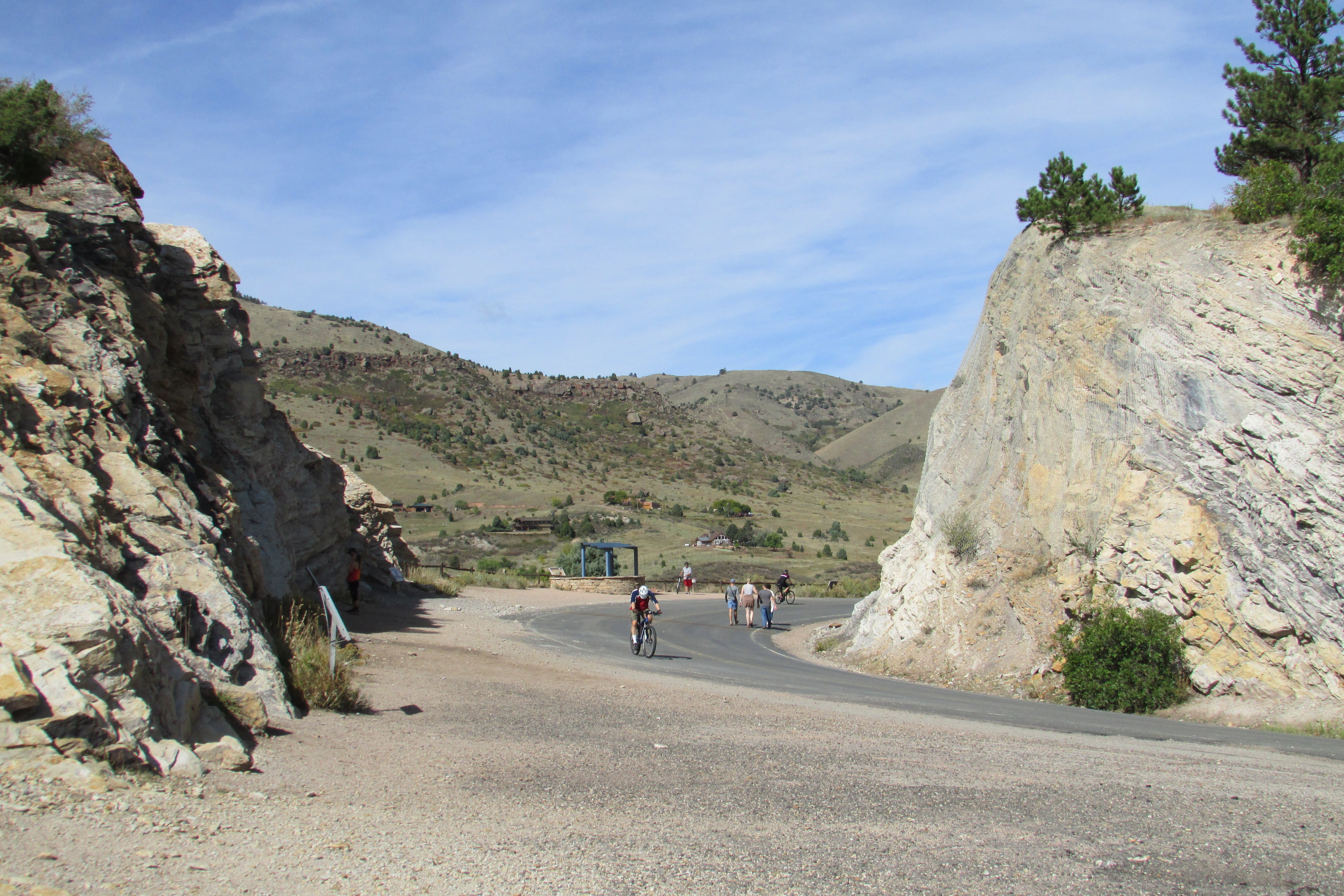
  Cretaceous period sandstone layers in the road cut at Dinosaur Ridge, Golden-Morrison Fossil Areas National Natural Landmark, Colorado.
- Concretion - A large, ball-shaped concretion were found in this layer of rock. Concretions form around a central nucleus (sometimes organic material). The formation of concretions is still a bit of a mystery.
- Volcanic Ash Bed – Bedded among layers of sandstone is a white layer of volcanic ash. In 2009, the Massachusetts Institute of Technology dated it to 104.6 Mya matching the Cretaceous Period of the fossil record. The ash came from volcanic fields far to the west.
- Geologic Overview - including a look west to the 300 mya Fountain Formation, in which Red Rocks Amphitheatre is located.
- Dinosaur Bulges
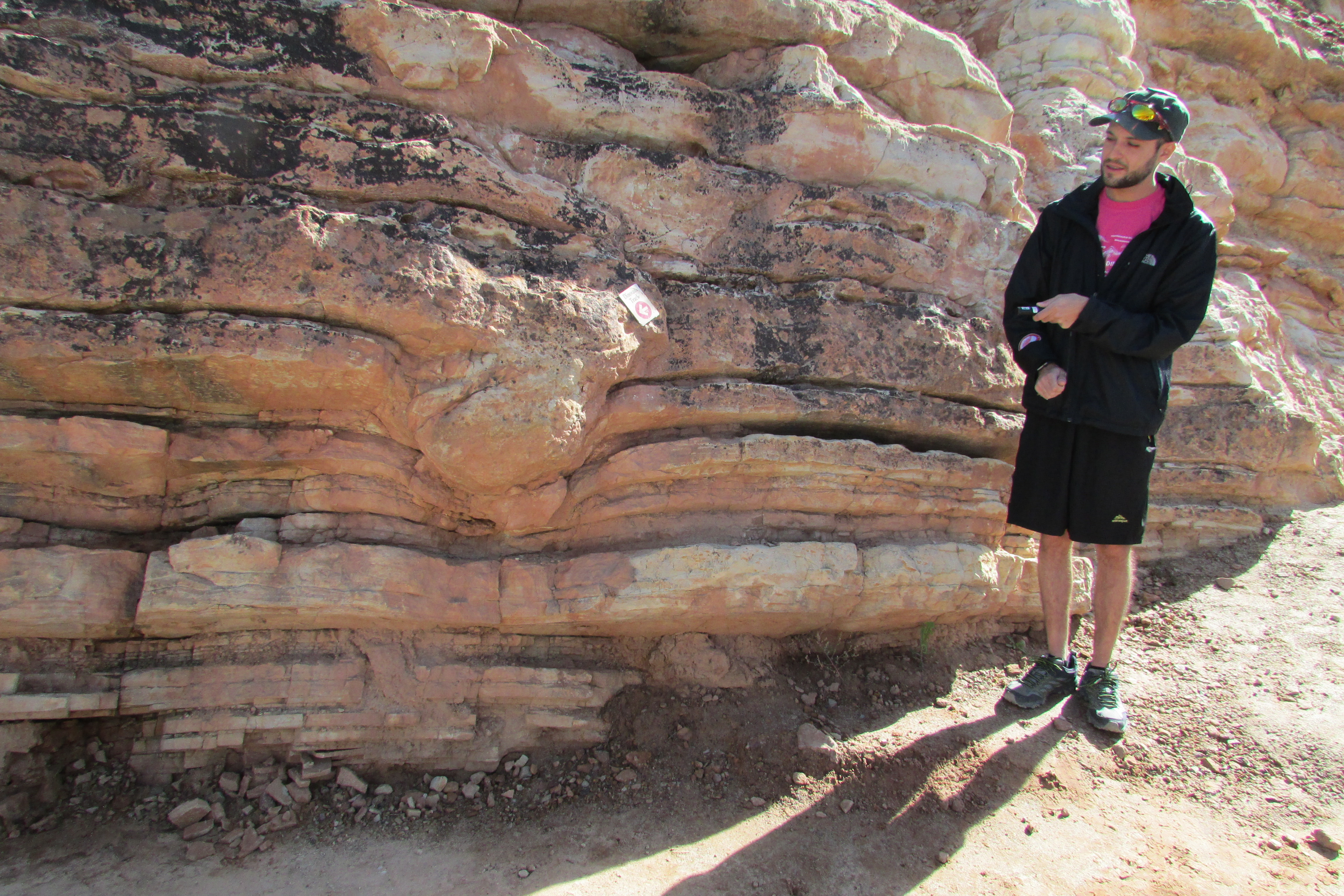
  Guide describing the "bulges" - a track exhibit at Dinosaur Ridge, in the Golden-Morrison Fossil Areas National Natural Landmark, Colorado.
  The bulges are natural casts - the "undersides" of footprints. Walking across soft mud and sand, animals made footprints in the soil, and then more mud and sand filled in the footprints, forming a new layer of sediment. Over time these layers of sediment lithified into rock, and then uplift and erosion revealed the fossilized footprints. Footprint bulges at this site represent those of a large sauropod, as well as a smaller bipedal herbivore (possibly a Camptosaurus).
- Theropod Track - Removed from its original location in 1937 during road construction, the track is from a carnivorous theropod, possibly a young Allosaurus, which is a dinosaur whose fossils have been found in these layers. The animal that left this particular track is estimated to have been about 11.5 feet (3.5 m) tall.
- Dinosaur Bone Quarry – Scattered throughout this layer are rusty brown fossils. The fossils are smooth in texture and rusty brown in color. They include fossilized dinosaur ribs, vertebrae, and leg bones, as well as teeth, and a variety of other identifications, including turtle and lungfish fossils. Among the fossils identified here were the first-named Stegosaurus fossils, two types of sauropod fossils (Apatosaurus and Camarasaurus), as well as Allosaurus fossils. Bone deposits formed along the inside of a bend of a fast-moving stream, forming a "point bar" as the fast-moving water deposited sand and the bones of decaying animals. Over time, a series of point bars developed with a variety of bones encased in the sand to become fossils.
- West Gate (elevation 6,100 feet (1,900 m)) The west end of the trail is barricaded across the roadway, but vehicles are allowed to park along the spur from Morrison Road that has become a cul-de-sac.
