= Dakota Hogback =

Ridge in the Rocky Mountains, US

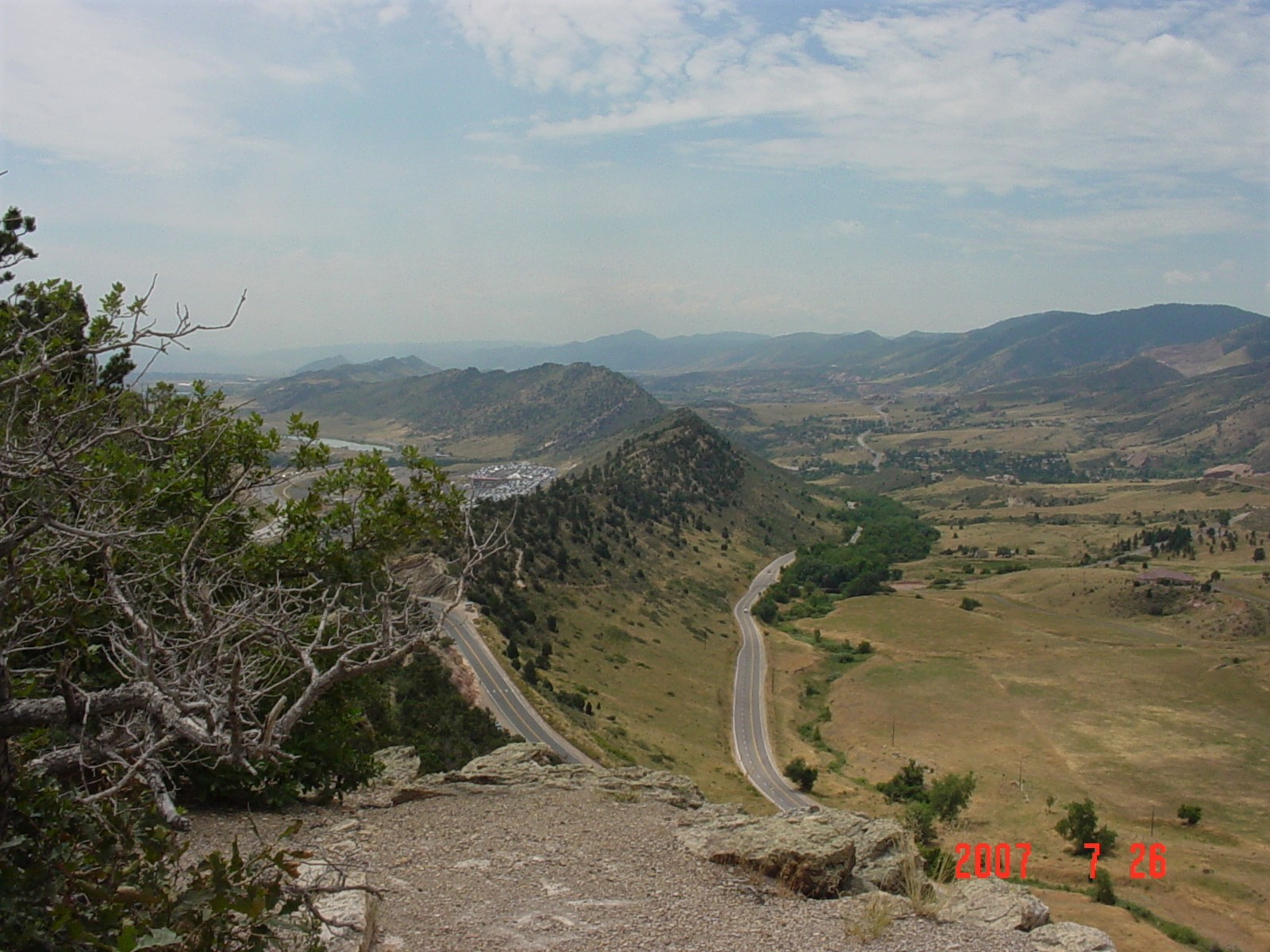
- The Dakota Hogback viewed south from the Dakota Ridge Trail at the crest of Dinosaur Ridge, just south of Interstate 70.

Highest point
- Coordinates: 39.676022°N 105.192688°W

Geography
- Parent range: Rocky Mountain Front Range

Geology
- Orogeny: Laramide
- Rock type(s): Cretaceous Dakota Group sandstone and shale anticline

The Dakota Hogback is a long hogback ridge at the eastern fringe of the Rocky Mountains that extends north-south from southern Wyoming through Colorado and into northern New Mexico in the United States. The ridge is prominently visible as the first line of foothills along the edge of the Great Plains. It is generally faulted along its western side, and varies in height, with gaps in numerous locations where rivers exit the mountains. The ridge takes its name from the Dakota Formation, a formation with resistant sandstone beds that cap the ridge. The hogback was formed during the Laramide orogeny, approximately 50 million years (50 my) ago, when the modern Rockies were created. The general uplift to the west created long faulting in the North American Plate, resulting in the creation of the hogback.

While the hogback was created during the Laramide Orogeny, the geologic strata comprising the hogback are much older. For example, fossilized data such as dinosaur footprints have been observed in the exposed strata, created by dinosaurs which lived during the Jurassic Period approximately 150 million years ago. Some of these footprints were attributed to the Diplodocus dinosaur and could be seen on the hogback west of Denver, Colorado as recently as the 1980s.

The ridge forms a barrier between the high plains and the Rocky Mountain foothills. The ridge is pierced by a few water-cut gaps, which have been used to provide road access between the mountains and the plains. The ridge is paralleled by I-25 from north of Cheyenne, Wyoming, through Colorado, into northern New Mexico. The ridge is to the west. North of Denver its major gaps are I-80 in southern Wyoming, U.S. Highway 34 at Loveland, and U.S. 36 to Rocky Mountain National Park. Interstate 70 passes through a highway cut, revealing the numerous layers making up the ridge. South of Denver, the major gaps are U.S. Route 24 in Colorado Springs, U.S. Route 50 in Pueblo, and finally in Colorado, U.S. Route 160 in Walsenburg.

== Orogeny ==
Before the mountains, the region was a shallow sea. As sediments fell to the bottom of the water, they were compressed into soft sedimentary rock. Thus, oyster and clam shells, sand, and mud built slowly into layers of sandstone, shale, limestone, and "mudstone." As the Rocky Mountains rose over the last 67 million years, up to nearly 30,000 feet above sea level, the soft sedimentary rocks were quickly weathered and washed away from the high mountains. But on the edge of the foothills, where the layers were scraped and pushed only slightly upward, the western edge of their remnant still stands at about a 45-degree angle - the Dakota Ridge. The top layer is a hard sandstone, the Dakota Sandstone, from which the ridge gets its name. It protects the softer shales and limestones beneath it from weathering and erosion.
