= Cody Shale =

Geologic formation in the United States

- Stratigraphic range: Late Cretaceous
- Type: Sedimentary
- Sub-units: see text
- Underlies: Mesaverde Formation
- Overlies: Frontier Formation
- Thickness: 500-1000 m

Lithology
- Primary: shale

Location
- Region: Montana folded belt province, Central Montana uplift, Big Horn basin, Powder River basin, Wind River basin
- Country: United States
- Extent: Wyoming, Idaho, Montana

Type section
- Named for: Cody, Wyoming
- Named by: C. T. Lupton, 1916

The Cody Shale is a Late Cretaceous geologic formation. It is mapped in Wyoming, Idaho, and Montana.

The formation is described by W.G. Pierce as follows: upper part is buff, sandy shale and thinly laminated buff sandstone; lower part is dark gray, thin-bedded marine shale.

The formation is divided into many members that vary regionally. Alphabetically:

- Ardmore Bentonite Beds (WY)
- Belle Fourche Member (MT, WY)
- Carlile Member (MT, WY)
- Claggett Member (MT, WY)
- Eldridge Creek Member (MT)
- Gammon Ferruginous Member (MT, WY)
- Greenhorn Calcareous Member (MT)
- Niobrara Member (MT, WY)
- Sage Breaks Member (WY)
- Shannon Sandstone Member (MT, WY)
- Steele Member (WY)
- Sussex Sandstone Member (WY)
- Telegraph Creek Member (MT, WY)
- Wallace Creek Tongue (WY)

Certain members rise to formation rank in other areas; for example, the Greenhorn is classified as a formation in a number of states, particularly in Colorado and Kansas.
