= Benton Shale =

Geologic formation (shale) in Montana, Wyoming, and other states

- Stratigraphic range: Cretaceous
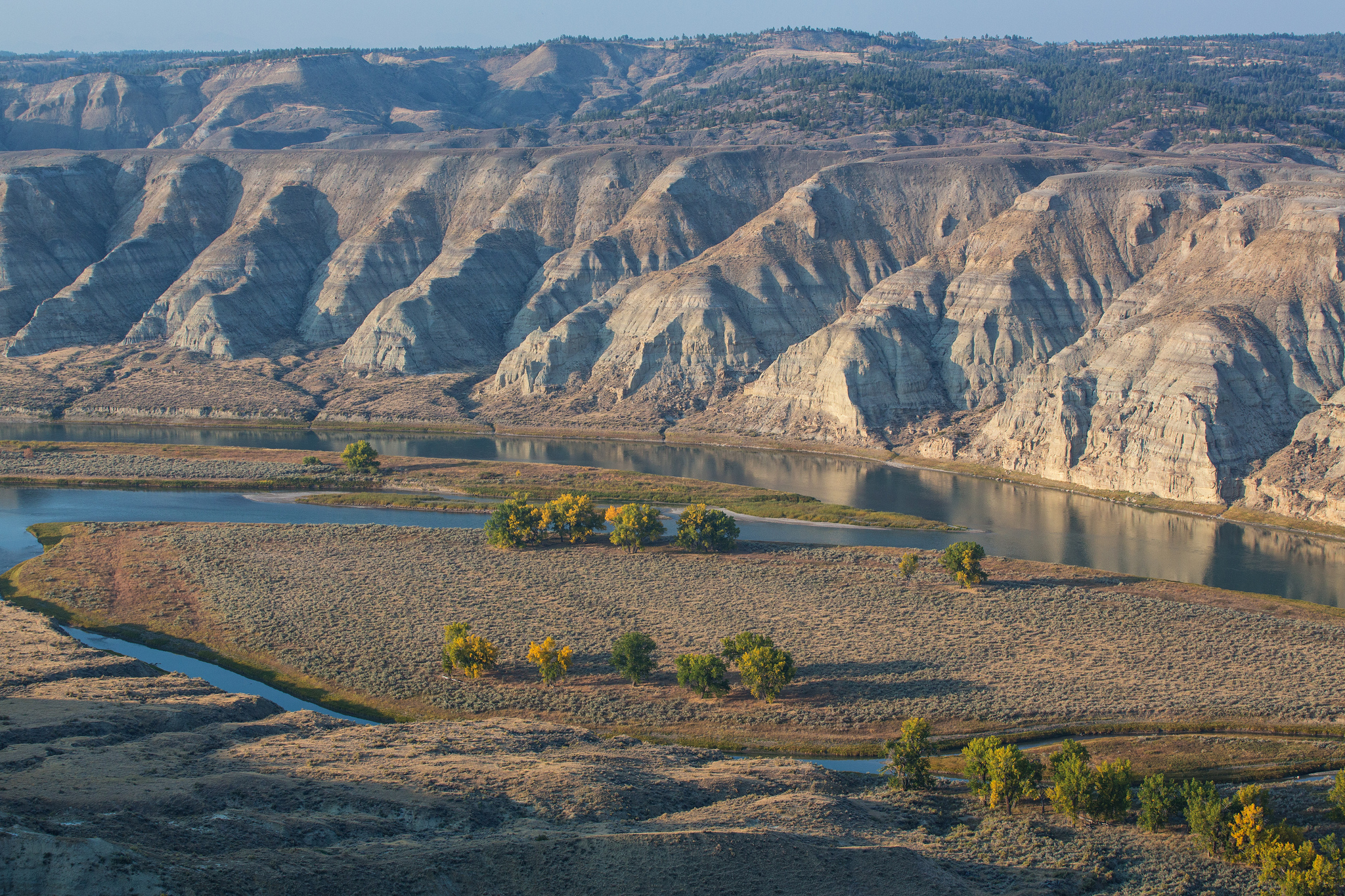
- Shale bluffs at Cow Island, Montana in the Missouri River Breaks adjoining Fort Benton, the type location of the Benton Shale. As seen in this image, the overlying Niobrara Formation is not as distinct from the Benton Shale as in the lower plains and these shales were later reclassified as Colorado Shale. The Benton name was abandoned here in favor of subdivision as Belle Fourche Shale, Greenhorn Limestone, and Carlile Shale.
- Type: Formation
- Underlies: Niobrara Formation
- Overlies: Dakota Sandstone

Lithology
- Primary: Shale, chalky shale, chalk beds
- Other: many bentonite seams, septarians, selenite, occasional sandstone

Location
- Region: Montana, Wyoming, North Dakota, South Dakota, Colorado, Nebraska, Kansas
- Country: United States

Type section
- Named for: Fort Benton, Montana
- Named by: Meek, F.B. and Hayden, F.V.
- Year defined: 1862

The Benton Shale (also Benton Formation or Benton Group) is a geologic formation name historically used in Montana, Wyoming, North Dakota, South Dakota, Colorado, Kansas, and Nebraska. In the "mile high" plains in the center of the continent, the named layers preserve marine fossils from the Late Cretaceous Period. The term Benton Limestone has also been used to refer to the chalky portions of the strata, especially the beds of the strata presently classified as Greenhorn Limestone, particularly the Fencepost limestone.

== Naming and status ==
The name was applied by Meek, F.B. and Hayden, F.V. in 1862 to the gray marine shales, often chalky in the middle layers, lying above the terrestrial Dakota Sandstone and usually below the massive limestones at the base of the Niobrara Chalk. The name was taken from the type outcrop at Fort Benton, today a small city in Montana on the Upper Missouri River.

Today, the Benton classification is obsolete in some regions, having been replaced by the ascending sequence Graneros Shale/Belle Fourche Shale, Greenhorn Limestone, and Carlile Shale. However, many old publications used the name. And the use of the Benton Group name continues in the Front Range where the Graneros Shale, Greenhorn Limestone, Carlile Shale, and Codell Sandstone may be recognized as member units.

In the lower Missouri River, west of Yankton, South Dakota, the distinction between the Benton and the Niobrara is very clear. This is near Meek and Hayden's type location for the Niobrara, the Niobrara River. On the shores of Lewis and Clark Lake between Yankton and the Niobrara River, high bluffs of near white Fort Hays Limestone are perched above the top of the gray shales that Meek and Hayden named "Fort Benton". However, at their Fort Benton type location for the Benton Group, the Fort Hays Limestone layer is hardly distinct from the Benton Shale and is identifiable only by its major change in fossil species.

The Mancos Shale of the Colorado Plateau correlates with the Colorado Shale, and the Tokay Tongue of the lower Mancos is a synonym for the Benton Shale.

== Bentonite ==
There are many thin beds of volcanic ash in the unit that have devitrified into mostly montmorillonite. Taking its name from the formation, this material is called bentonite. Iron sulfide in the bentonite seams converts to rust when exposed to air resulting in orange lines across exposures of Benton shale and chalk.

== Gallery ==
Red Rock Canyon Open Space, Colorado Springs, Colorado

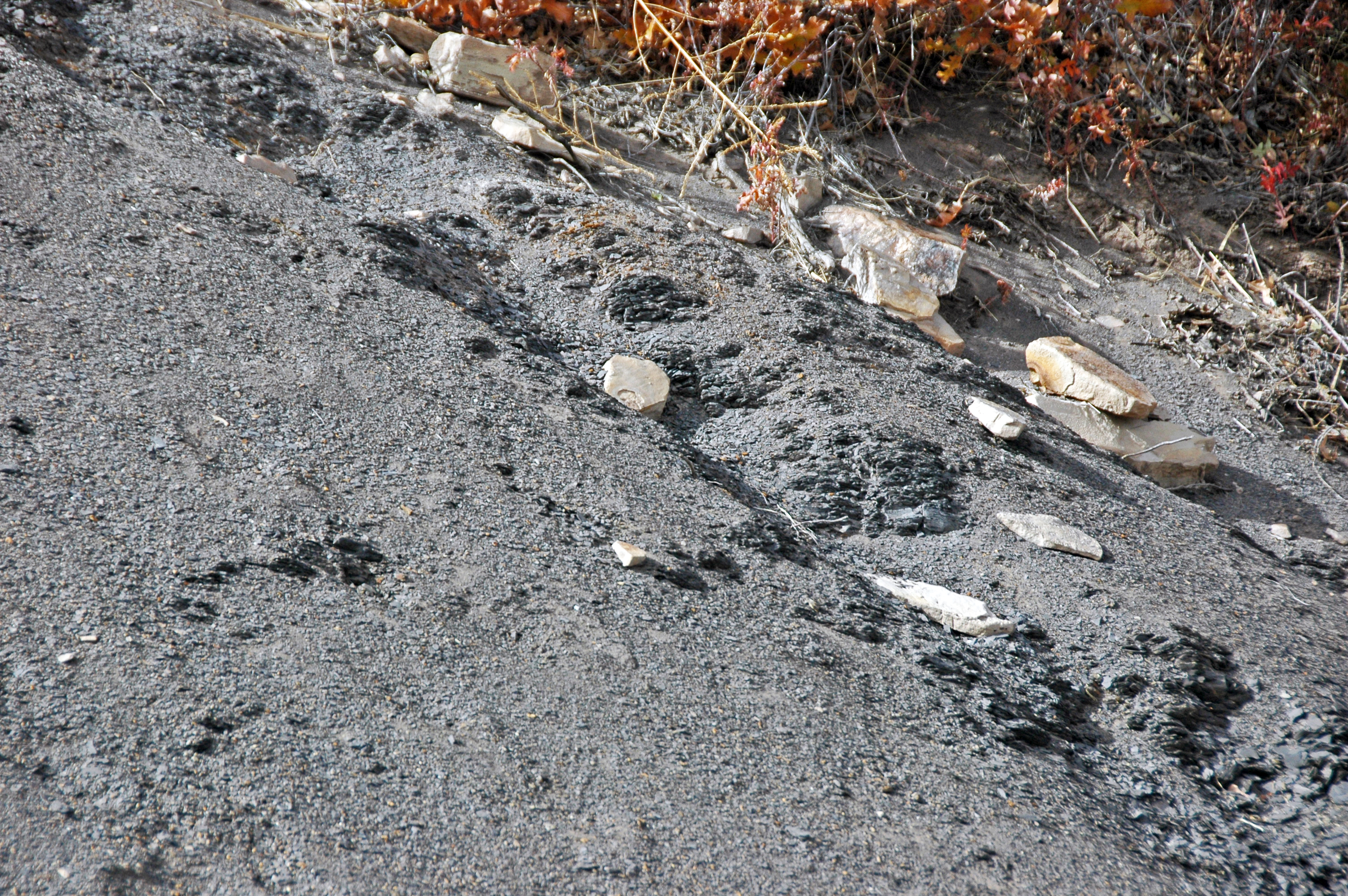
Gray Benton Shale

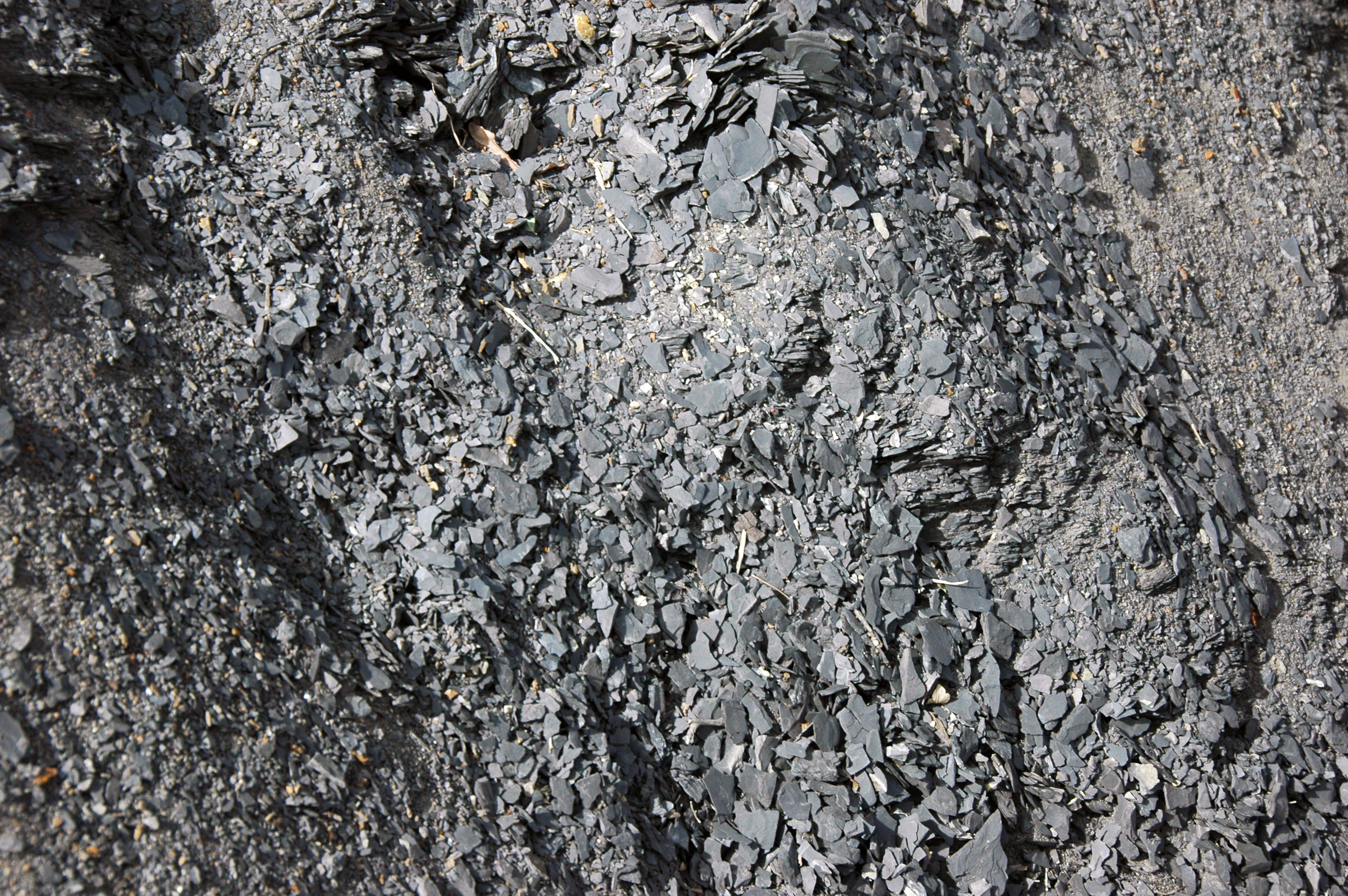
Gray Benton Shale

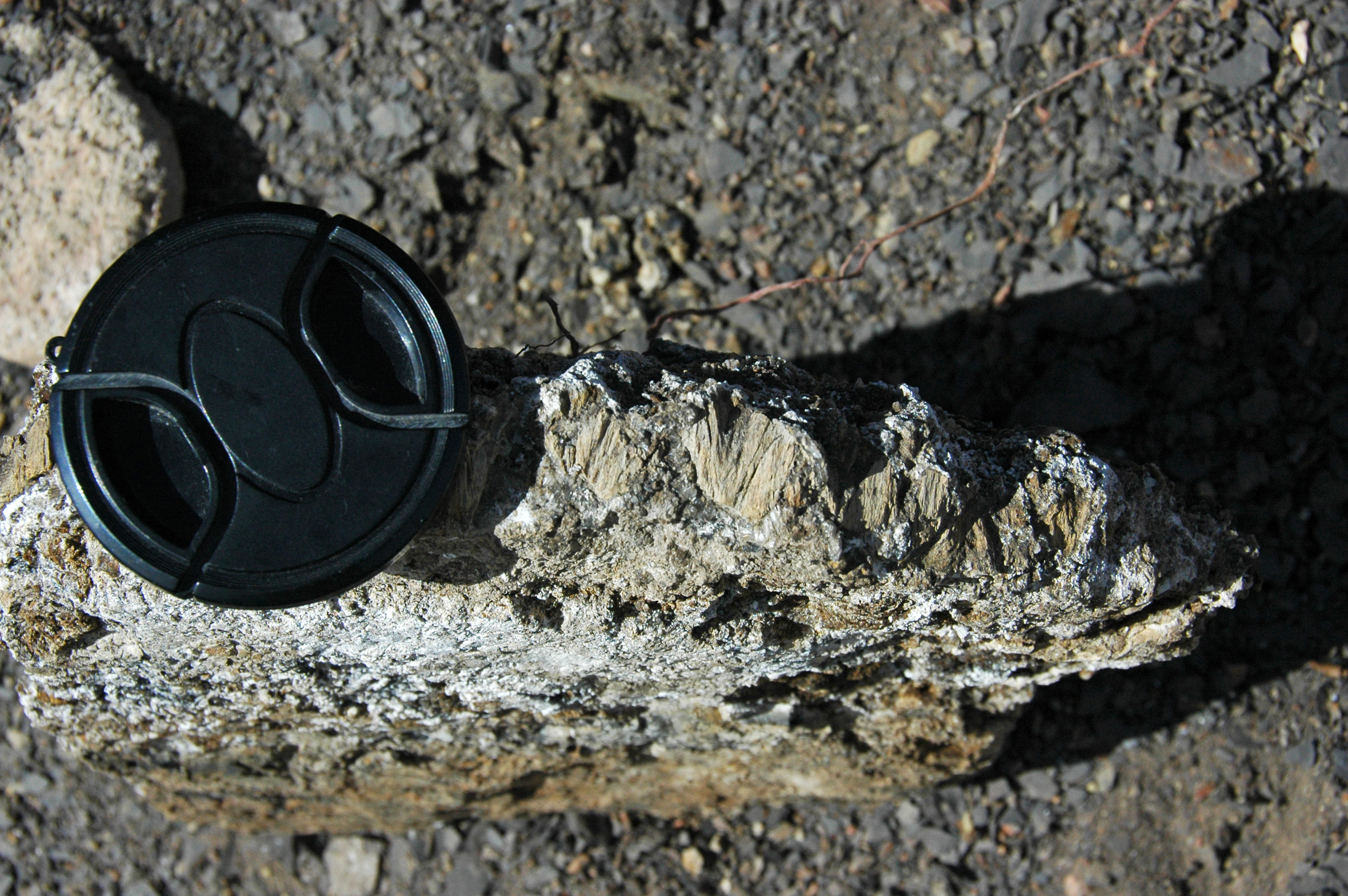
Concretionary cone-in-cone structures in Benton Shale

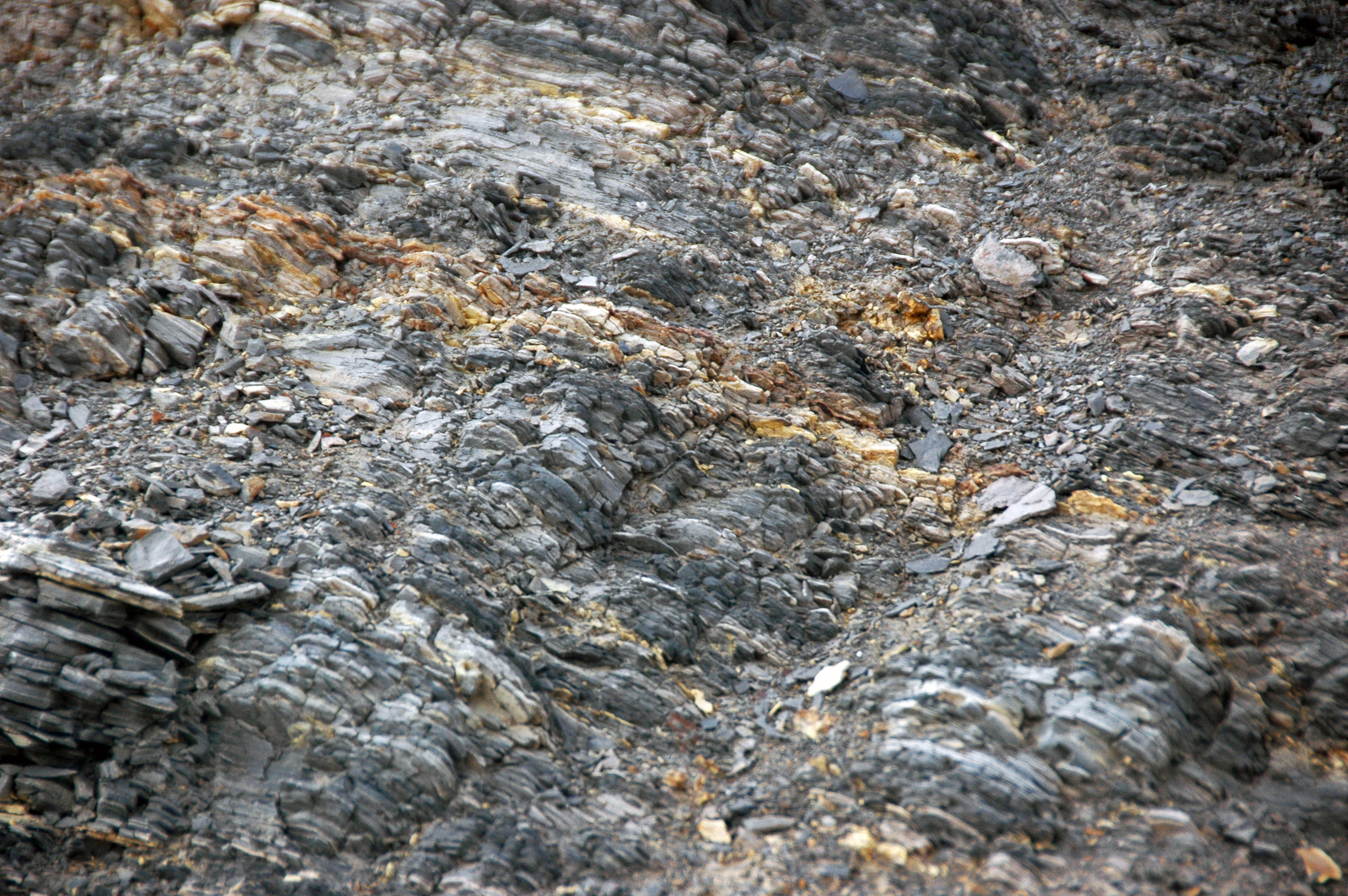
Bentonite seams in the Benton Shale
Other locations

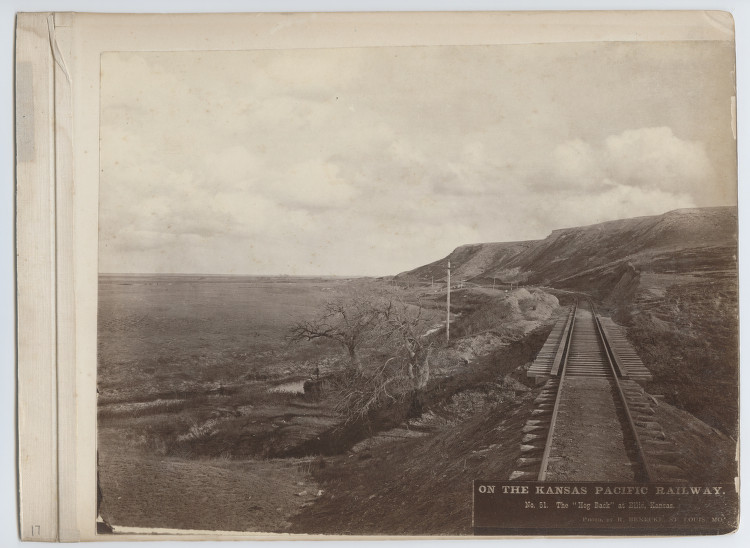
Benton Group identified at Ellis Co. "Hogback" in Kansas by F. V. Hayden in 1871 (Benecke, 1874)

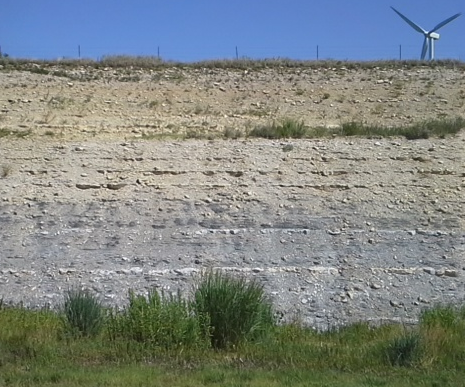
Chalk rhythmites in "old Benton" Greenhorn member in Lincoln County, Kansas

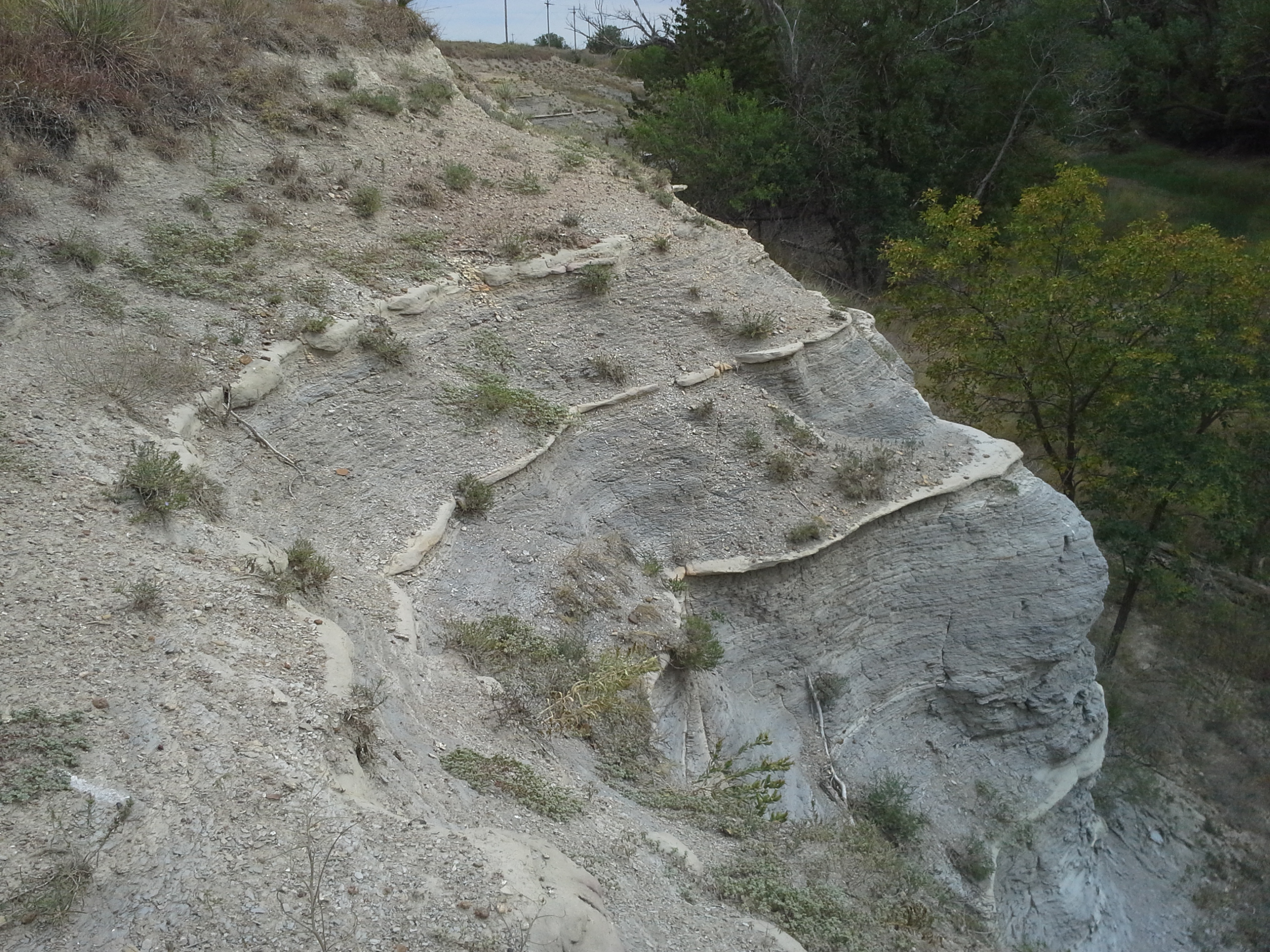
Chalk rhythmites in "old Benton" Lower Carlile member in Ellis County, Kansas

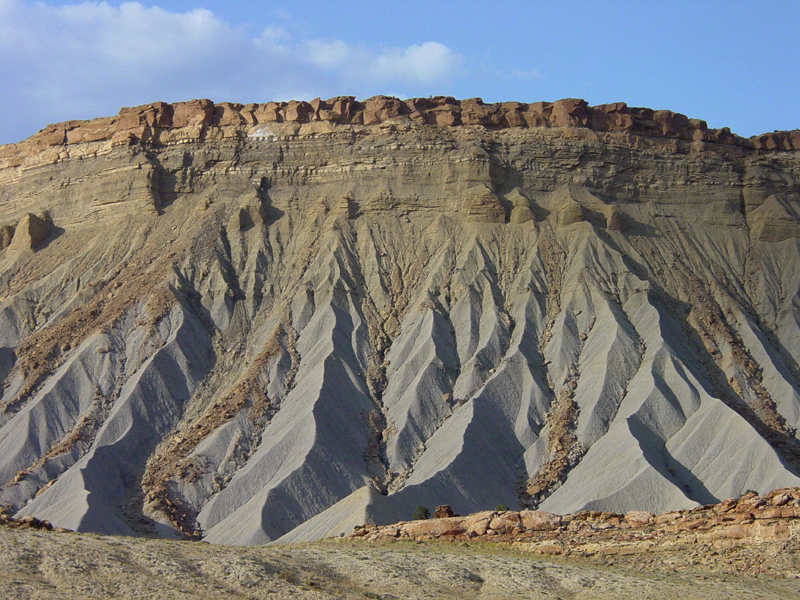
Correlated strata in Mancos Shale, southern Utah, 'compare with type location image at top of article

== See also ==
- List of fossiliferous stratigraphic units in Montana
- Paleontology in Montana
