= Juana Lopez Member =

Stratigraphic member of the Carlisle Shale

- Stratigraphic range: Turonian
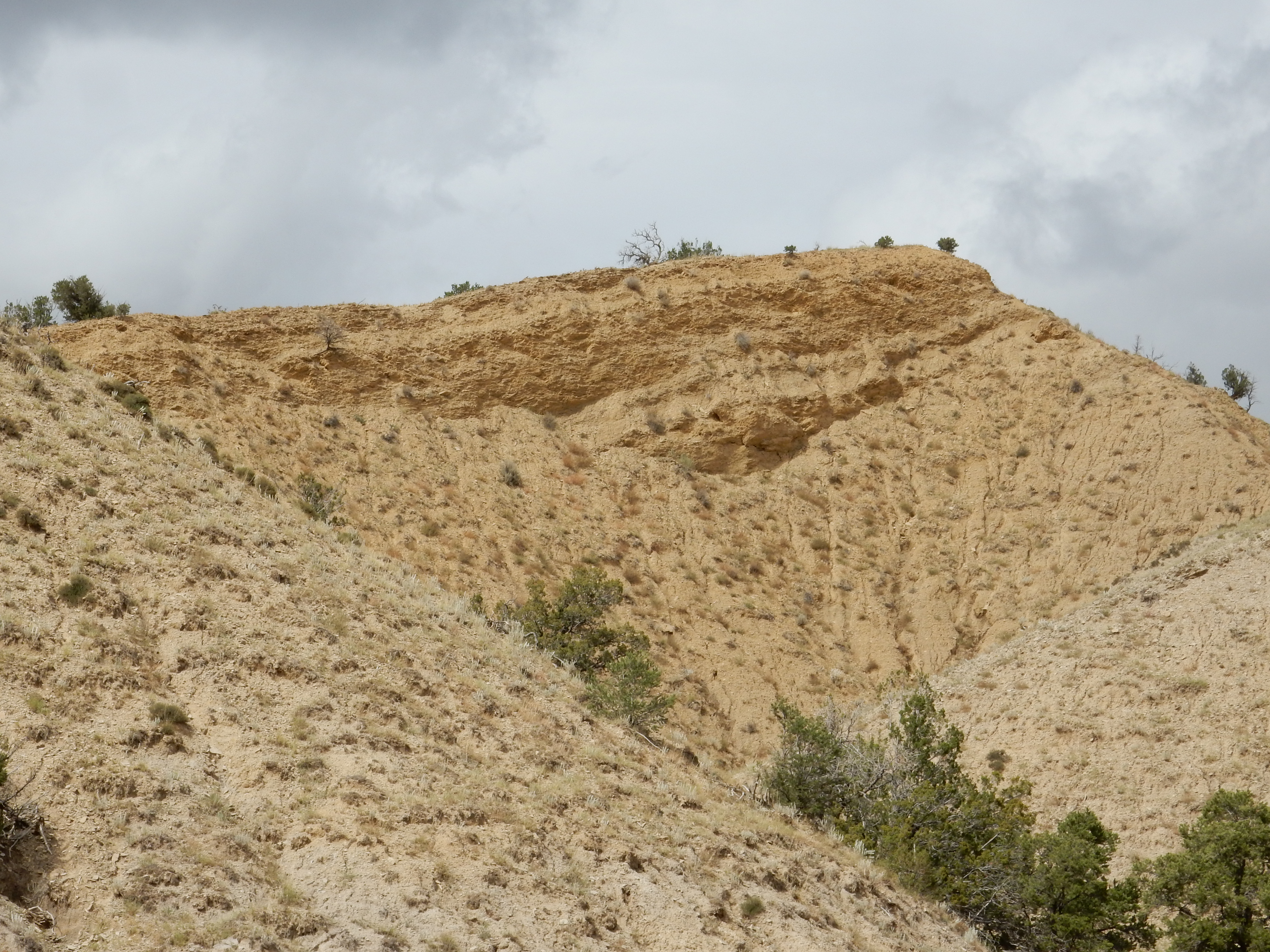
- Juana Lopez Member near its reference section south of Cuba, New Mexico
- Type: Member
- Unit of: Mancos Shale (San Juan basin); Carlile Formation (Denver and Raton Basins); Benton Shale (North Park Basin)
- Underlies: Niobrara Formation
- Overlies: Codel Sandstone member of the Carlile
- Thickness: 140 feet (43 m)

Lithology
- Primary: Sandstone with abundant carbonate fossil grains
- Other: Gravel, Codel fragments

Location
- Coordinates: 35.4866°N 106.2010°W
- Country: United States

Type section
- Named for: Mesita Juana Lopez Grant, six miles northwest of Los Cerrillos, New Mexico
- Named by: Rankin
- Year defined: 1944
- Juana Lopez Member (the United States) Juana Lopez Member (New Mexico)

Juana Lopez refers to both the uppermost member of the Carlile Shale formation and to the environment that caused it to form. The Juana Lopez Member is calcareous sandstone dated to the Turonian age of the Upper Cretaceous and is exposed in the southern and western Colorado, northern and central New Mexico, and northeastern Utah. The unit has been described as "the most enigmatic" member of the Carlile Shale.

== Description ==
The Juana Lopez Member consists of beds of calcarenite separated by intervals of mudstone. Calcarenite is a form of limestone composed mostly of sand-sized carbonate grains. In the Juana Lopez Member, these are mostly fragmented coral, shells (especially inoceramid prisms), shark teeth, bone, and other fragmented fossils. The Juana Lopez Member smells of sulfur when freshly broken. It formed on wide, shallow marine shelf, with strong wave action, but with little sediment coming in from land. It was exposed on the land surface between the retreat of the Greenhorn cycle and the advance of the Niobrara cycle of the Western Interior Seaway.

As originally defined, the unit included only the uppermost calcarenite bed, with a thickness of less than 10 feet (3.0 m). As currently defined, the unit includes the entire sequence of calcarenite beds separated by mudstone intervals, and is up to about 140 feet (43 m) thick.

The unit is one of the most extensive units of the Western Interior Seaway, being present in the Mancos Shale of the San Juan Basin, the Carlile Shale of the Denver Basin and Raton Basin, and the Benton Shale of the North Park Basin. Outcrops have been found as far east as Kansas and as far south as west Texas.

== Fossils ==
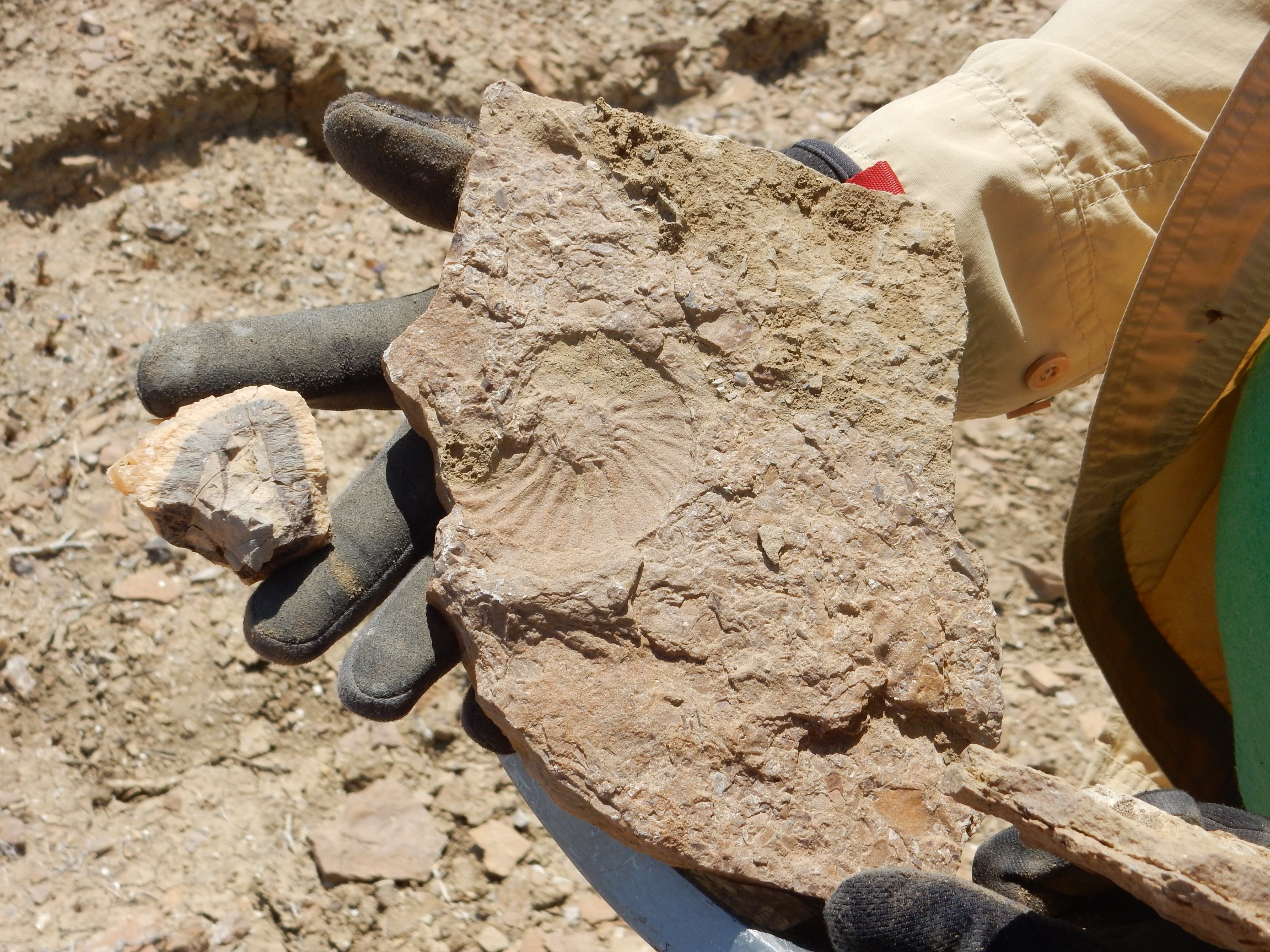
Concretion and ammonite cast from the Juana Lopez Member

The unit is highly fossiliferous. Fossils identified in the unit are primarily marine molluscs, including Prinocyclus, Inoceramus, Ostrea, Lopha lugubris, Coilopoceras, Hourcquia, and Scaphites. The fossils indicate that the member is upper Turonian in age. Teeth of the shark Ptychodus are also found.

== History of investigation ==
The distinctive beds and fossils of the member were first noted by John Strong Newberry in 1861. The member was first designated in 1944 by C.H. Rankin, Jr., who recognized the member throughout northern New Mexico and western Colorado. Rankin established the correlation between the Mancos Shale and the Colorado Group and was able to identify most of the units of the Colorado Group within the Mancos Shale, and identified the top of the Juana Lopez Member as the top of the Carlile Shale. In 1955, Dan Bozanic revised the definition of the member to include a much larger set of beds, and this revision has been widely accepted.
