= Fort Hays Limestone Member =

Fort Hays Limestone
- Stratigraphic range: Cretaceous
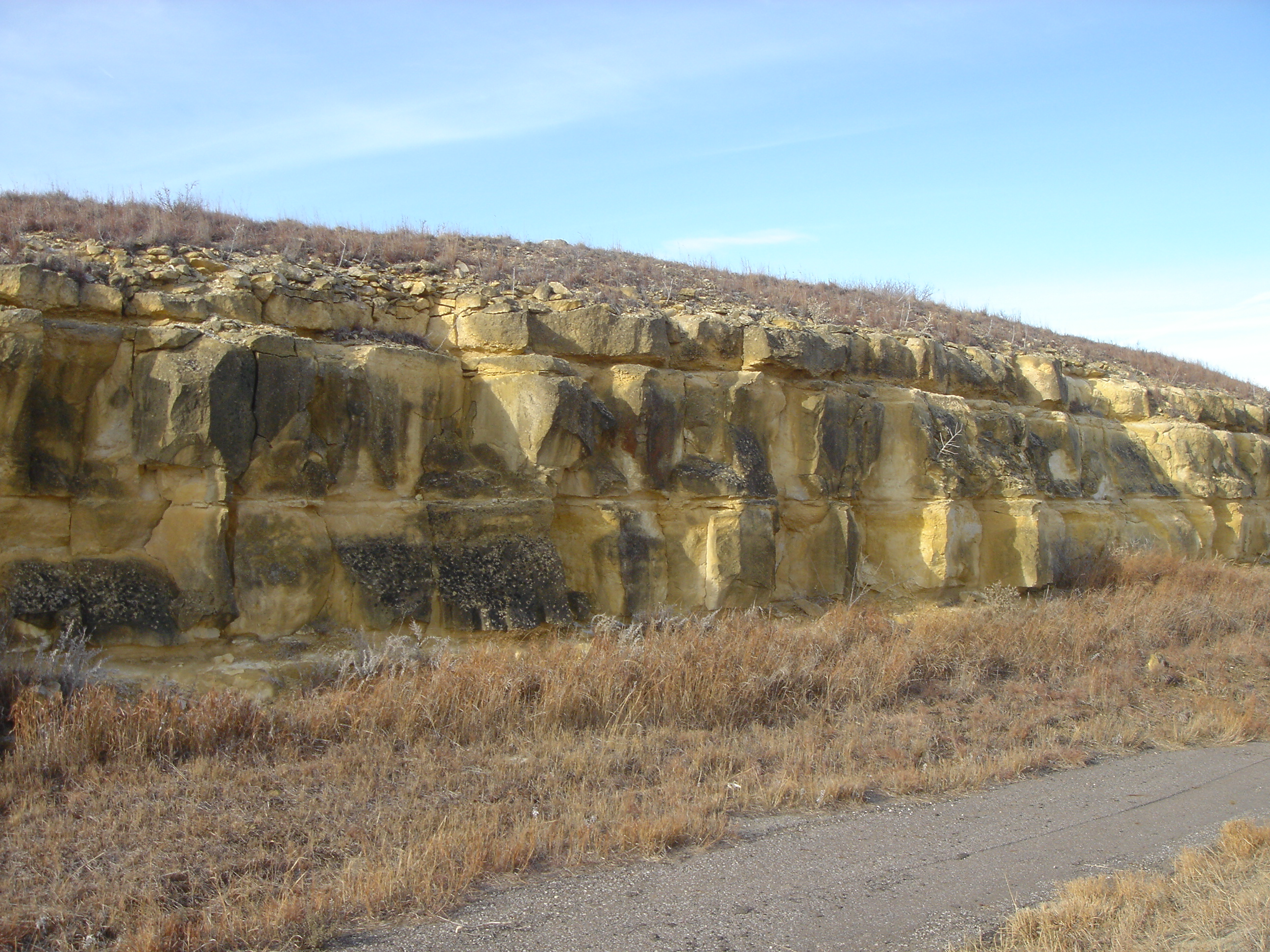
- Fort Hays Limestone in the K-147 road cut at the Cedar Bluff State Park, Kansas, USA.
- Type: Member
- Unit of: Niobrara Formation of the Colorado Group
- Underlies: Smoky Hill Chalk Member of the Niobrara Formation
- Overlies: Non-conformably, Codell Sandstone, Blue Hill Shale, or Juana Lopez members of the Carlile Formation

Lithology
- Primary: Limestone
- Other: Shale partings

Location
- Region: Mid-continental: Colorado, Kansas, Nebraska, South Dakota
- Country: United States

Type section
- Named for: Fort Hays
- Named by: S. W. Williston
- Location: Hogback ridge just west of old Fort Hays, Kansas
- Year defined: 1893

The Fort Hays Limestone is a member of the Niobrara Formation of the Colorado Group exposed in Colorado, Kansas, Nebraska, and South Dakota and is named for the bluffs near the old Fort Hays, a well-known landmark in western Kansas.

Defining the southeast border of the High Plains, the towering stone-capped bluffs of the Fort Hays Escarpment are "perhaps the most conspicuous physiographic boundary in Kansas."

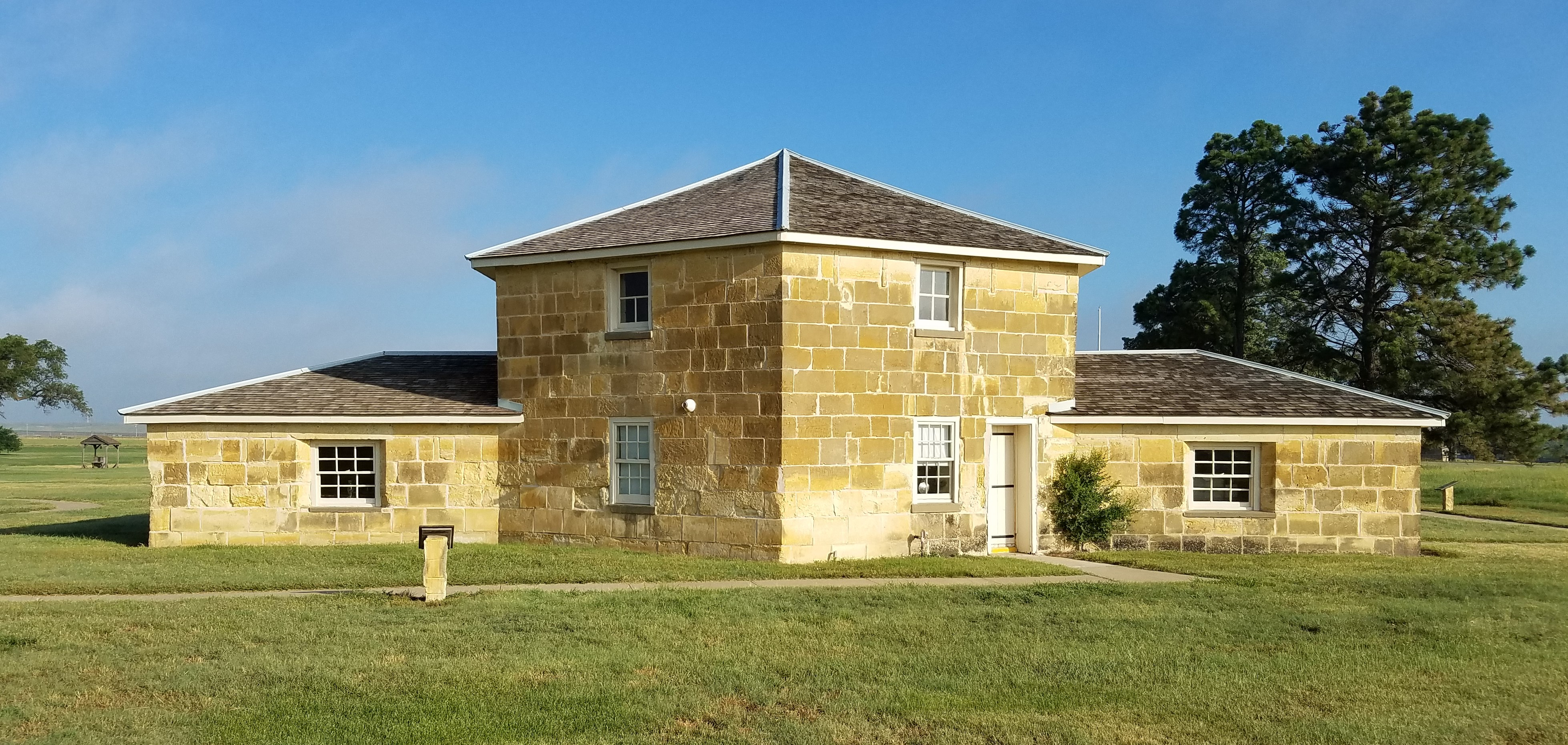
The iconic stone blockhouse of Fort Hays is built from the namesake limestone.

The Fort Hays Limestone was a generally practical building stone. However, it deteriorates when in contact with soil (note the repaired foundation on the Old Fort Hays Blockhouse). In contrast, the Fencepost limestone is quite durable in the ground, so, the Fencepost can be seen in foundation course of buildings that are otherwise faced with Fort Hays Limestone. Particularly in Hays and Ellis, where the Fort Hays and Fencepost outcrops are in close geographic proximity, the two limestones are seen in combination in buildings.

== See also ==
- List of fossiliferous stratigraphic units in Colorado
- List of fossiliferous stratigraphic units in Kansas
- List of fossiliferous stratigraphic units in Nebraska
- Paleontology in Colorado
- Paleontology in Kansas
- Paleontology in Nebraska
