= Mancos Shale =

Late Cretaceous geologic formation of the Western United States

- Stratigraphic range: Mid Albian-Campanian; ~110–80 Ma
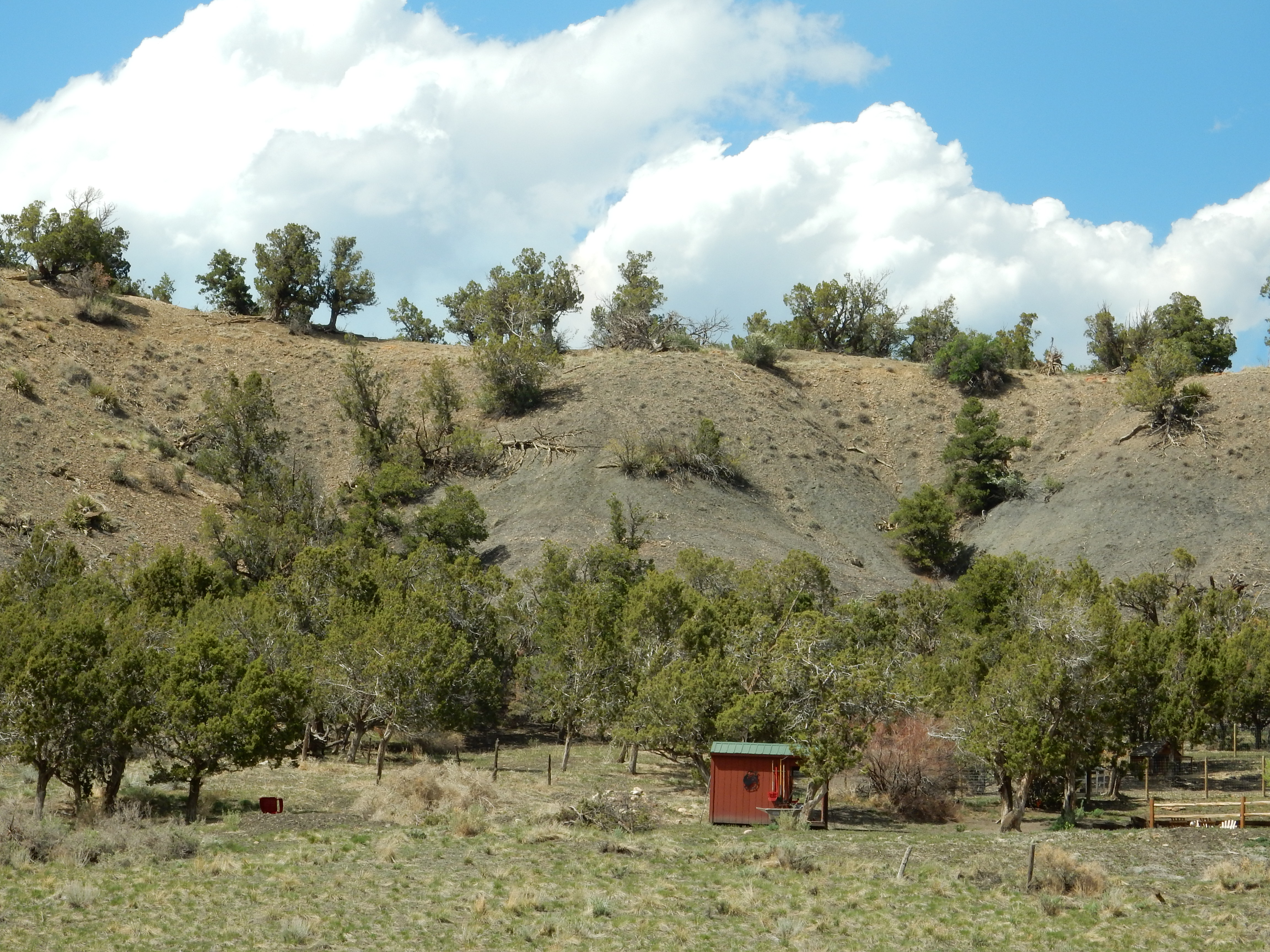
- Mancos Shale at its type location just north of Mancos, Colorado
- Type: Geologic formation
- Sub-units: See text
- Underlies: Mesaverde Formation
- Overlies: Dakota Group

Lithology
- Primary: Shale

Location
- Coordinates: 37.353°N 108.297°W
- Region: Arizona, Colorado, New Mexico, Utah, Wyoming
- Country: United States
- Extent: Basin and Range, Colorado Plateau and San Juan Mountains Provinces

Type section
- Named for: Mancos, Colorado
- Mancos Shale (the United States) Mancos Shale (Colorado)

The Mancos Shale or Mancos Group is a Late Cretaceous (Upper Cretaceous) geologic formation of the Western United States.

The Mancos Shale was first described by Cross and Purington in 1899 and was named for exposures near the town of Mancos, Colorado.

== Geology ==
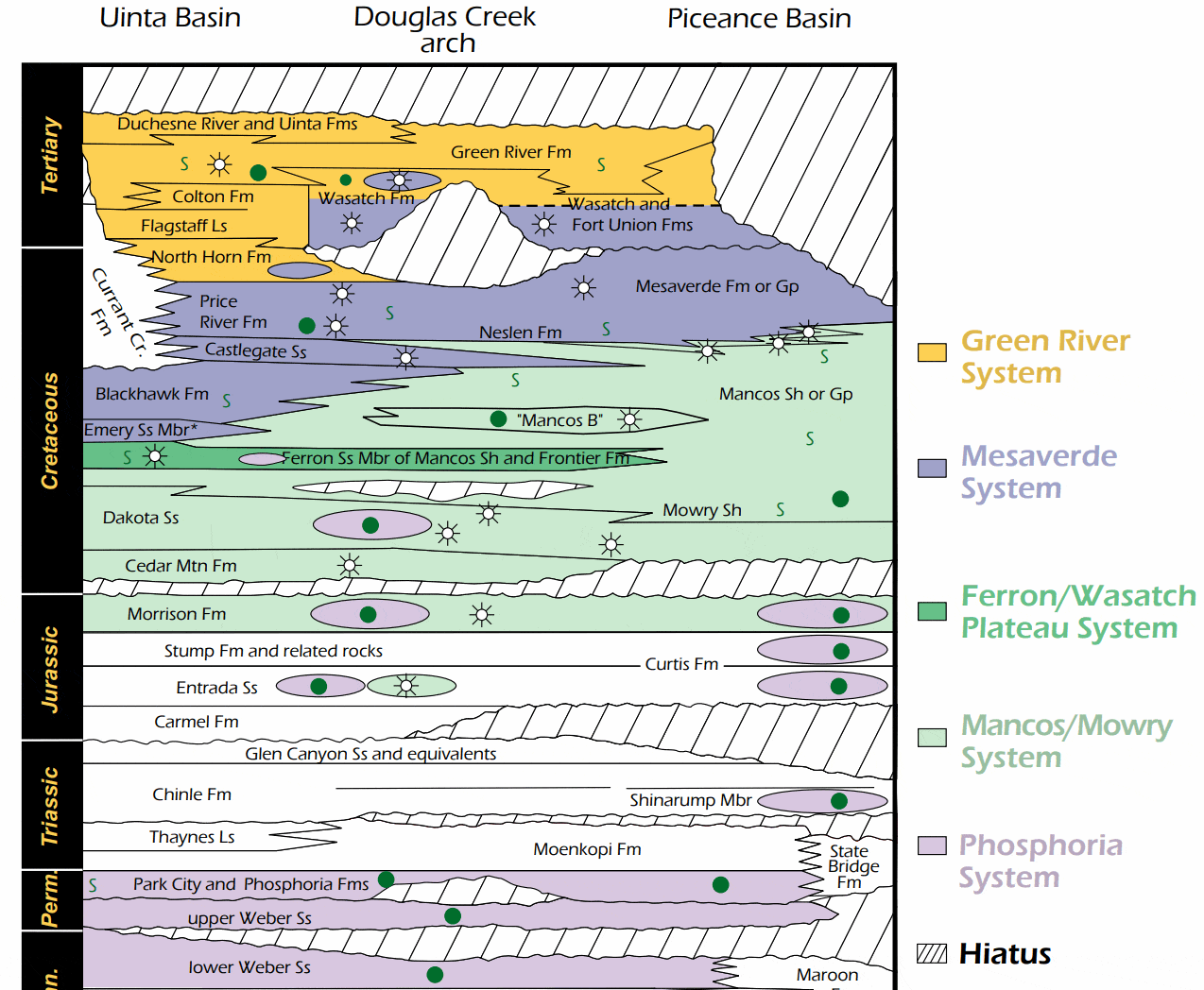
Stratigraphic column showing the relationship of the Mancos and Mowry shales

The unit is dominated by mudrock that accumulated in offshore and marine environments of the Cretaceous North American Inland Sea. The Mancos was deposited during the Cenomanian (locally Albian) through Campanian ages, approximately from 95 million years ago (Ma) to 80 Ma.

Stratigraphically the Mancos Shale fills the interval between the Dakota and the Mesaverde Group.

The lower marine Mancos Shale conformably intertongues with terrestrial sandstones and mudstones of the Dakota and in its upper part grades into and intertongues with the Mesaverde Group. The shale tongues typically have sharp basal contacts and gradational upper contacts. Whereas in the plains east of the Rocky Mountains certain mappable marine shales are identified as formations (e.g., Skull Creek, Graneros), correlated deposits within the distribution of the Mancos are named as tongues of the greater Mancos Formation.

Thus, the classification broadly corresponds with the Colorado Group classification of the Great Plains region. Accordingly, various units of the Colorado Group are recognized within the Mancos in those areas where their distinct facies can be recognized.

== Occurrences ==
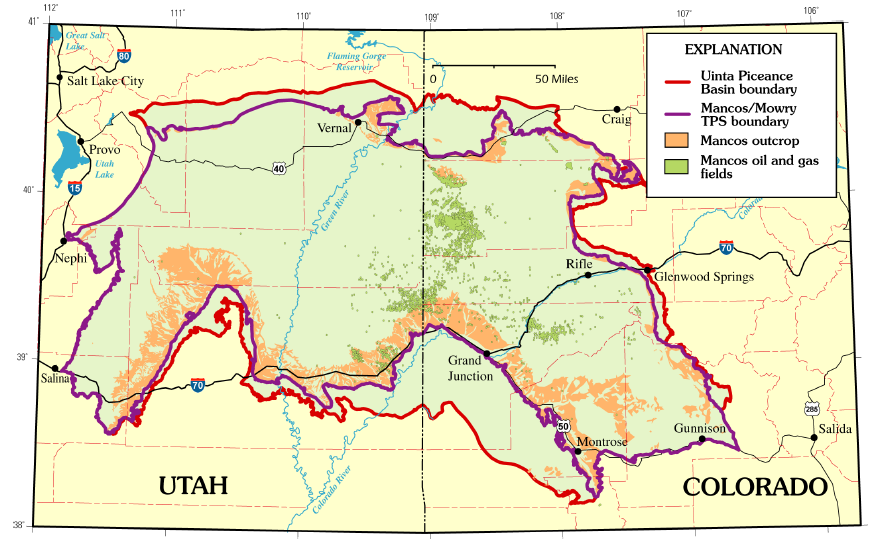
Mancos Shale and Mowry Shale oil and gas fields within the Uinta Basin and Piceance Basin

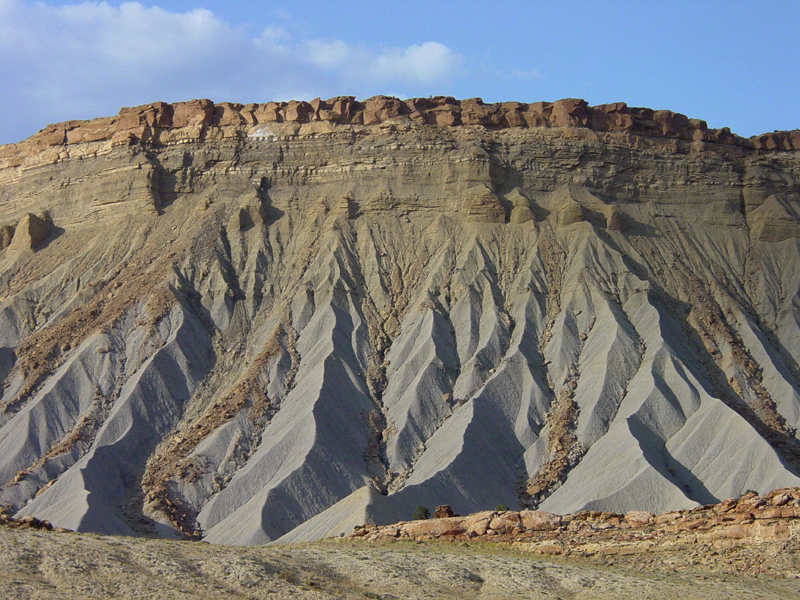
Mancos Shale badlands in Capitol Reef National Park, southern Utah.

The Mancos occurs in the Basin and Range Province, the Colorado Plateau Province, and the San Juan Mountains Province.

=== Structural basins ===
The Mancos is a diverse unit, with dozens of named subunits in different structural basins that often intertongue with other formations. The subunits and intertonguing formations (in italics) in each basin, in stratigraphic order, are:

- Black Mesa Basin

Upper shale member
Hopi Sandy Member
Middle shale member
Lower shale member

- Chama Basin

Upper shale unite
El Vado Sandstone Member
Middle shale unit
Cooper Arroyo Sandstone Member
Juana Lopez Member
Lower shale unit
Greenhorn Limestone
Graneros Shale

- Estancia Basin (Mancos Group)

Niobrara Formation
Carlile Shale
Greenhorn Limestone

- Paradox Basin

West and northwest

Masuk Member
Emery Sandstone
Blue Gate Shale
Ferron Sandstone
Tununk Shale

North

Buck Tongue
Castlegate Sandstone
Juana Lopez Member

Northeast and east

Juana Lopez Member
Greenhorn Limestone

- Piceance Basin

Buck Tongue
Anchor Mine Tongue
Main body

- San Juan Basin

Mulatto Tongue
Dilco Coal Member of Crevasse Canyon Formation
Niobrara Calcareous Shale
Carlile Shale
Greenhorn Limestone
Graneros Shale
Paguate Tongue of Dakota Formation
Clay Mesa Tongue

- Socorro Basin

D-Cross Tongue
Gallup Sandstone
Pescado Tongue
Tres Hermanos Formation
Rio Salado Tongue
Twowells Tongue of Dakota Formation
Whitewater Arroyo Tongue

- Uintah Basin

Anchor Mine Tongue
Sego Sandstone
Upper shale member
Frontier Sandstone
Middle shale member
Aspen Shale
Lower shale member
Mowry Shale

== History of investigation ==
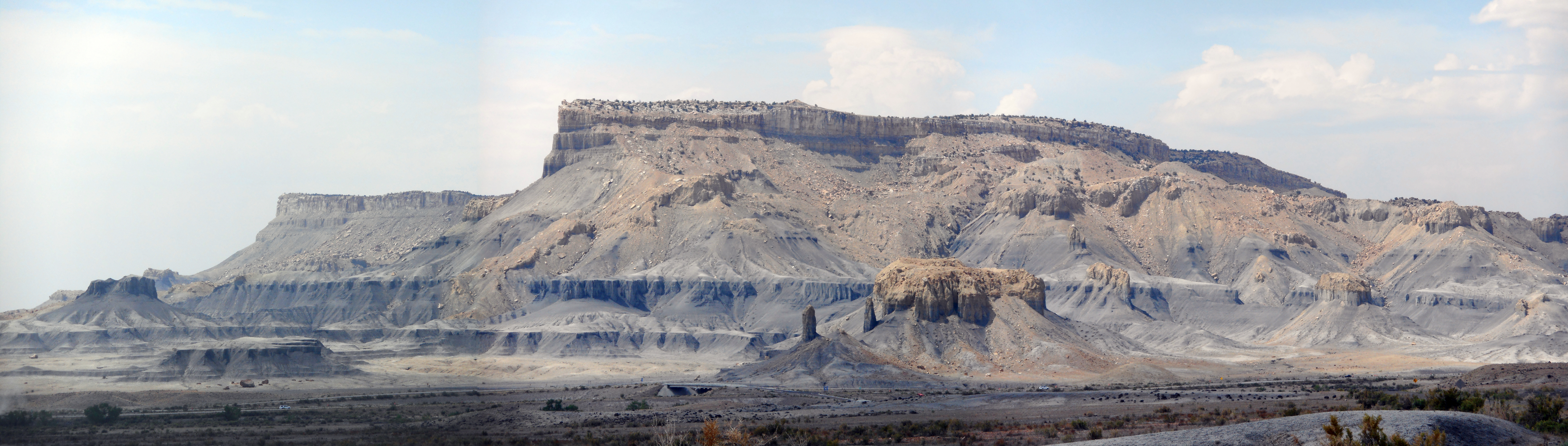
Tununk Member of the Mancos Shale below the capping Ferron Sandstone Member. West side of the San Rafael Swell, Emery County, Utah.

The Mancos Shale was first named by Charles Whitman Cross and C.W. Purington in 1899, for outcrops near the town of Mancos, Colorado, and along the Mancos River nearby. The two geologists also traced the unit into the Telluride, Colorado, area. W.T. Lee had traced the unit north into the Grand Mesa area, defining it as all marine shale between the Dakota and the Mesaverde. It was subsequently traced into Utah and New Mexico.

During their work in New Mexico in 1924, J.B. Reeside Jr., and F.H. Knowlton found that the Mancos Shale could be divided into biostratigraphic layers corresponding closely to formations of the Colorado Group further east. By 1944, Rankin had concluded that most of the formations of the Colorado Group could be identified as lithostratigraphic members of the Mancos Shale as well. The unit was raised to group rank by C.E. Jamison in 1911, and is sometimes given group rank in New Mexico and Utah as well.

== See also ==
- List of fossiliferous stratigraphic units in Arizona
- List of fossiliferous stratigraphic units in Colorado
- List of fossiliferous stratigraphic units in New Mexico
- List of fossiliferous stratigraphic units in Utah
- List of fossiliferous stratigraphic units in Wyoming
