= Ferron Sandstone =

Geologic unit in Utah, USA

- Stratigraphic range: Cretaceous
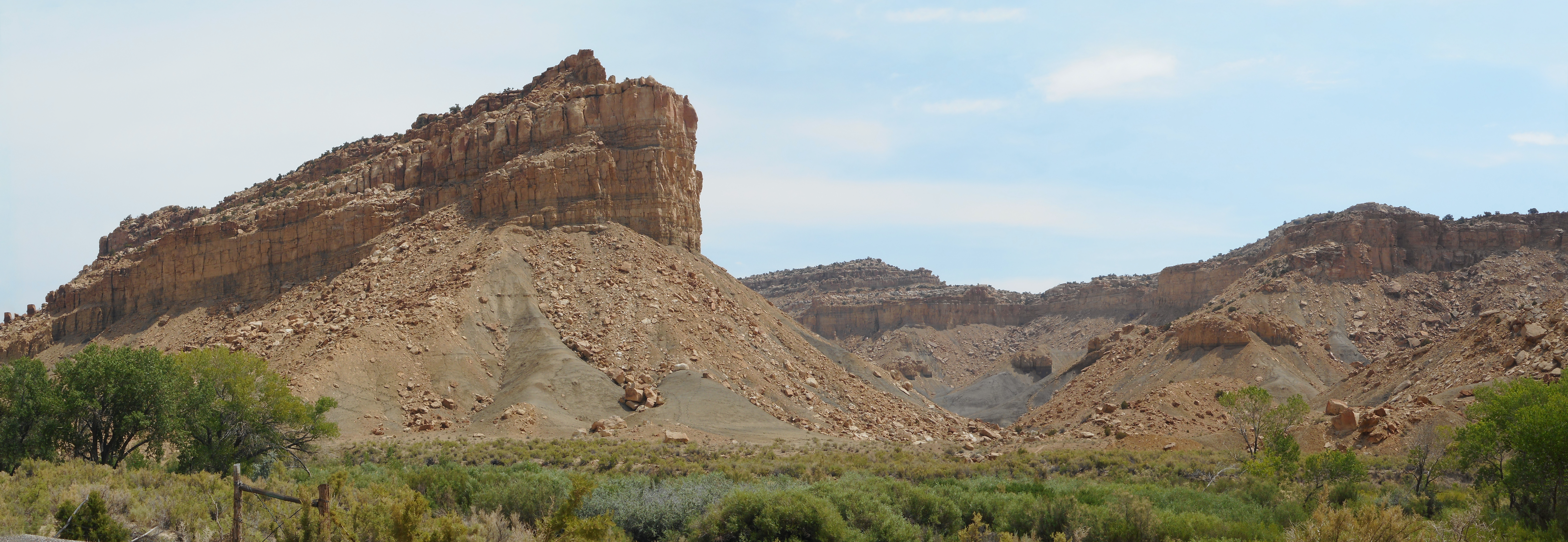
- Cliff of Ferron Sandstone 7 miles south of the type section, Emery County, Utah.
- Type: Member

Lithology
- Primary: sandstone

Location
- Region: Utah
- Country: United States

The Ferron Sandstone is a geological member of the Mancos Shale in Utah. It preserves fossils dating back to the Cretaceous period; and more specifically the middle Turonian. Named by Lupton (1916), the formation is readily divisible into upper and lower members on the basis of both lithologic character and depositional history. Tectonic rejuvenation of adjacent provenance areas near the present Mount Nebo and Fish Lake Plateau shed coarser clastics eastward into the shallow seaway. This resulted in deposition of the widespread and persistent basal regressive marine sandstone of the Ferron.

== Description ==
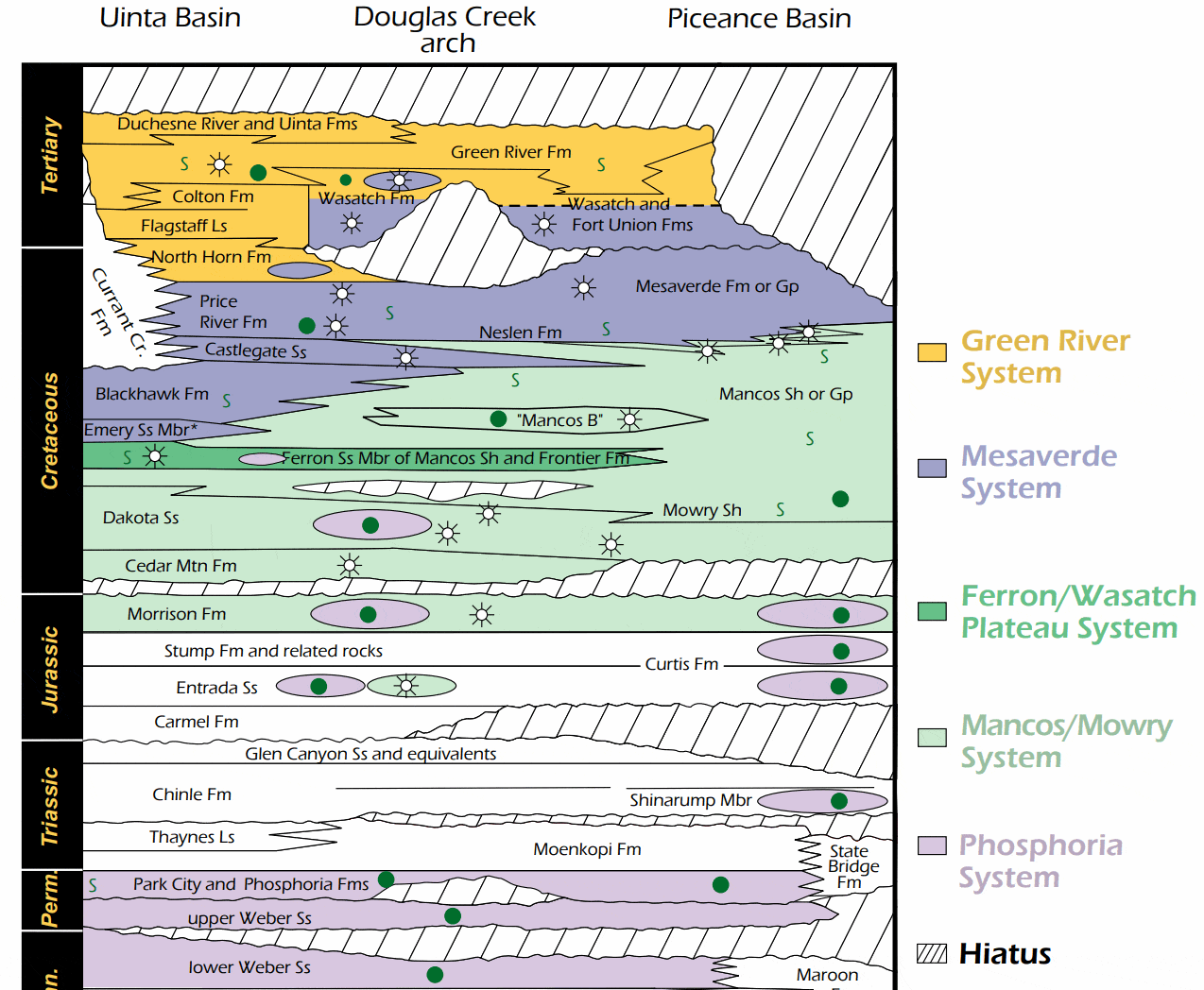
Uinta-Piceance Basin stratigraphic column showing the relationship of the Ferron Sandstone.

The Ferron Sandstone is bracketed by the overlying Blue Gate member of the Mancos Shale and the underlying Tununk Member of the Mancos Shale. It is composed of alternating yellow-gray, light-brown, and white sandstone, sandy gray shale, gray and carbonaceous shale, and coal. The sandstone is mostly fine to medium grained, calcareous, lenticular, thin to very thick bedded. It forms a resistant cliff above Tununk Member. The Ferron is 120 to 215 meters (394 to 705 ft) thick, thickening to the southwest. It is believed to represent flood dominated, marine-current and wave influenced deltas that drained the Cretaceous landscape.

== Paleontology ==
A diverse collection of 13 species of shark teeth from the lower part of the Ferron Sandstone include: Hybodus sp., Ptychodus cf. P. mammillaris Agassiz, 1843, Ptychodus whipplei Marcou, 1858, cf. Chiloscyllium sp., Scapanorhynchus raphiodon (Agassiz, 1843), Cretodus crassidens (Dixon, 1850), cf. Leptostyrax sp., cf. Cretalamna appendiculata (Agassiz, 1835), Squalicorax sp., Pseudohypolophus mcnultyi (Thurmond, 1971), Protoplatyrhina hopii Williamson, Kirkland and Lucas, 1993, Ischyrhiza schneideri (Slaughter and Steiner, 1968), and Ptychotrygon triangularis (Reuss, 1844). The assemblage is typical of Turonian shark fauna.

A trackway made by a medium-sized ornithopod is known near the Moore Road Cutoff near the type section. Other vertebrates include a pteranodontoid pterosaur represented by wing bones, crocodilian teeth, a turtle shell fragment, and a small ornithopod ilium.

Fossil plants include giant 1.8 m diameter log of the angiosperm Paraphyllanthoxylon, angiosperm leaves, and shoots of the confier Elatides curvifolia. These fossils indicate a mixed forest of angiosperm and conifer forests on the Turonian deltas.

== See also ==
- List of fossiliferous stratigraphic units in Utah
- Paleontology in Utah
