= Graneros Shale =

Geological formation

- Stratigraphic range: Cenomanian
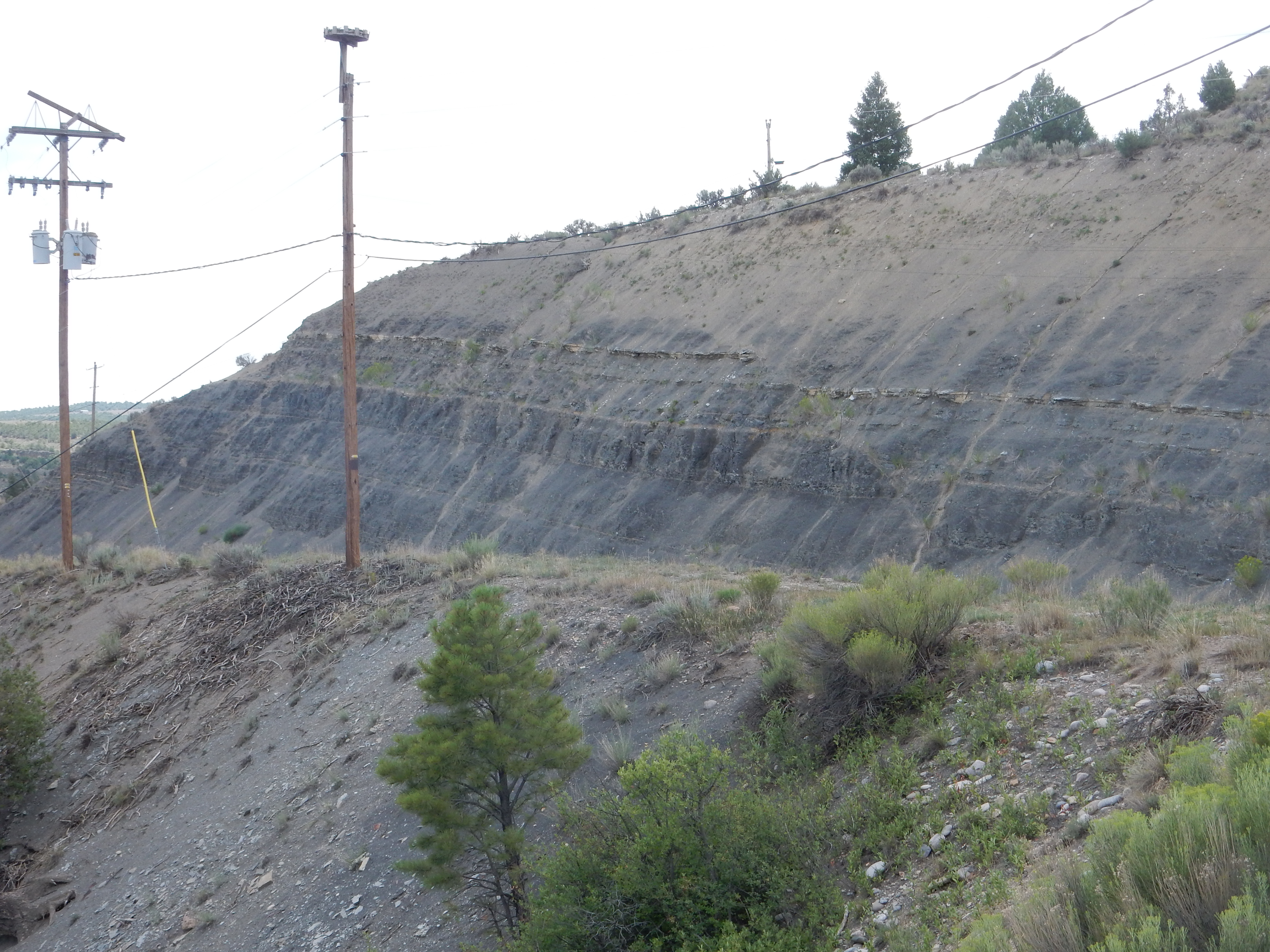
- Graneros Shale at outlet of El Vado Reservoir, New Mexico, USA
- Type: Formation
- Unit of: Colorado Group (Great Plains); Benton Group (Colorado, South Dakota); Mancos Group (Colorado, New Mexico)
- Sub-units: See text
- Underlies: Greenhorn Formation
- Overlies: Dakota Formation
- Thickness: 114–1,000 feet (35–305 m)

Lithology
- Primary: Shale
- Other: Sandstone, limestone

Location
- Coordinates: 38.2763°N 104.7121°W
- Region: Colorado, Iowa, Kansas, Minnesota, Montana, New Mexico, Nebraska, North Dakota, South Dakota, Wyoming
- Country: United States

Type section
- Named for: Graneros Creek, Walsenburg quadrangle, Pueblo Colorado
- Named by: G.K. Gilbert (from R.C. Hills)
- Year defined: 1896
- Graneros Shale (the United States) Graneros Shale (Colorado)

The Graneros Shale is a geologic formation in the United States identified in the Great Plains as well as New Mexico that dates to the Cenomanian Age of the Cretaceous Period. It is defined as the finely sandy argillaceous or clayey near-shore/marginal-marine shale that lies above the older, non-marine Dakota sand and mud, but below the younger, chalky open-marine shale of the Greenhorn. This definition was made in Colorado by G. K. Gilbert and has been adopted in other states that use Gilbert's division of the Benton's shales into Carlile, Greenhorn, and Graneros. These states include Kansas, Texas, Oklahoma, Nebraska, and New Mexico as well as corners of Minnesota and Iowa. North Dakota, South Dakota, Wyoming, and Montana have somewhat different usages — in particular, north and west of the Black Hills, the same rock and fossil layer is named Belle Fourche Shale.

== Naming and Rank ==
F.B. Meek and F.V. Hayden originated the scientific names for the series of Cretaceous rocks in the central Great Plains of the North American Continent. They gave the name "Benton" to the great shale deposits between the sandstone bluffs at Dakota City, Nebraska, and the chalk bluffs at the junction of the Niobrara and Missouri rivers. At that time, the early 1860s, Meek and Hayden's "lower Cretaceous" series of the upper Missouri River, Dakota-Benton-Niobrara, was already widely observed from Canada to New Mexico over the Great Plains up to the foothills of the Rocky Mountains.

In southcentral Colorado, southeast of Pueblo, this series expresses topographical patterns that inspired subdivision of the Benton shales. Wind and rivers rapidly erode the shales, producing bluffs: massive blocks of Niobrara Chalk cap high slopes of non-chalky Benton shale leading down a flatter plain that stretches miles to another bluff of chalky shale with many thin limestones. Particularly, in places where rivers have cut deeply through this lower chalky shale, and furthermore have cut into the bases of the bluffs, 100 feet (30 m) banks of non-chalky shale can be found. In 1896, G.K. Gilbert named this lower argillaceous shale Graneros (from R.C. Hills) for the exposures in Graneros Creek, a tributary of the Arkansas River near Pueblo. Thus, the Graneros records the opening transgression of the Greenhorn Marine Cycle of the Western Interior Seaway, and is therefore the complement of the similar Blue Hills Shale of the Carlile Formation that records the regression of the same Greenhorn Sea.

By 1938, the Graneros had been mapped into eastern Wyoming, southeastern Montana, South Dakota, Nebraska, Kansas, and northeastern New Mexico. The same Benton topography is also found in the Smoky Hills of Northcentral Kansas, and the same Graneros Formation is found on the river banks there. In Iowa and Nebraska, the Graneros grades into the middle-Cenomanian rock of the Woodbury Member of the Dakota Formation. As discussed in the Description section, the Graneros exceptionally demonstrates Walther's Law of Facies. As the Greenhorn Cycle of the Western Interior Seaway advanced eastward, formation of the Graneros also shifted eastward, but also upward in elevation and time, to such an extent that the top of the Graneros at Pueblo is older than the lowest Graneros in Iowa.

North of Kansas, the application of the name has been somewhat different. In 1904, describing the geology of the Black Hills of South Dakota, N.H. Darton applied the name Graneros Group to descending members; marine Belle Fourche Shale and Mowry Shale, terrestrial Newcastle Sandstone (a tongue of Dakota Formation from the southeast of South Dakota), and marine Skull Creek Shale. This group definition was a wide departure from the preceding applications of the early-Cenomanian Graneros name by applying it to late-Albian units. Robert M. Grace (1952) explains the basis for this association; previous studies associated these units by their fossil species rather than their lithological sequence. The late-Albian Skull Creek Shale in the Black Hills is seen with "microfauna identical to" that of the Newcastle, which, in sequence, traces to the Dakota type in the east. By the 1960s, Darton's definition was recognized as problematic, but many geologists continued to use this classification. It is understood that the listed formations are widely known individually, most with little relationship to the original Graneros Formation definition; and, the same or equivalent units are classified in Wyoming and Colorado as the Dakota Group. As a result, newer reports include the Belle Fourche (Graneros equivalent), Mowry, Newcastle, and Skull Creek within the Dakota Group of this region.

== Description ==
The Graneros Shale is primarily dark gray sandy and silty shale with minor sandstone and limestone lenses, with visible crystalline minerals (pyrite, marcasite, selenite, calcite). It also features septarians and other concretions. It rests on the Dakota Group and is in turn overlain by the Greenhorn Limestone. The thickness varies from 114–1,000 feet (35–305 m).

Because the Graneros Shale is nearly monolithologic, only one member and one bed have ever been named.

- Thatcher Limestone Member: Rather than calcite precipitates, the limestones of the Graneros (similar to the limestones of the Lincoln "Marble" just above the formation) are sorted skeletal remains of marine animals. These skeletal limestones indicate repeated disturbances of the bottom that washed away the silt, leaving mostly Inoceramidae shell fragments. Ostrea beloiti beds are a particular index fossil for the formation. The middle limestones of the formation are sufficiently developed in southcentral Colorado and northcentral New Mexico to be named Thatcher Limestone Member. Ammonites from the Thatcher Limestone Member are indicative of Cenomanian age.
- X-bentonite: While the formation has several thin bentonite beds, one unique bed is sufficiently thick, widespread, and widely used as a marker bed to be informally named "X", the commonly applied quotation marks indicating the lack of formal classification of the bed. A feature of bentonite beds is that they mark specific instants in geological time; that is, all locations where a particular bentonite bed is found are therefore known to record the same date in Earth history. The X-bentonite is radiometrically dated to 96 or 95 million years ago, and it is identifiable throughout the Western Interior Seaway marine sediments. At the Graneros type location, which was generally the deepest part of the Western Interior Seaway, the X-bentonite is actually in the lowest beds of the overlying Greenhorn Formation. However, progressing eastward from Pueblo, the X-bentonite is found within the top of the Graneros, then lower into the unit, and by Iowa, the X-bentonite is found at the bottom of the Graneros. This pattern is evidence that the Graneros was deposited in different locations in time and space; as the sea levels of the Greenhorn Cycle rose, the Graneros environment moved eastward in space and upwards in geologic time. The same is observed West of Pueblo; the base of the Graneros equivalent in the Mancos Shale rises to meet the X-bentinite in Utah and Arizona. In other words, before the X-bentonite ashfall, the Graneros shoreline environment was advancing east and west, leaving the central seaway, and by the time of the X-bentonite ashfall, it was in the process of advancing into the regions of modern Iowa and Utah, respectively.

As discussed in the previous Naming and Rank section, the Graneros name was applied in South Dakota to a group of other units; however, this has no relation to the description of the Graneros Shale formation.

== Hydrocarbon exploration ==
The Graneros/Belle Fouche Shale is an important hydrocarbon source rock in the High Plains production basins.

== Fossils ==
The upper part of the formation contains abundant oyster fossils and the ammonoids Tarrantoceras sellardsi Adkins, Desmoceras, Anthoceras, and Borissiakoceras. The mollusks Inoceramus rutherfordi Warren, Ostrea beloiti Logan, and Turrilites acutus americanus are also present. Fossils become more scarce in Wyoming.

== See also ==
- Belle Fourche, the unit's name in its northern range
- List of fossiliferous stratigraphic units in Colorado
- Paleontology in Colorado
