= Frontier Formation =

Geological formation in the United States

- Stratigraphic range: Cenomanian-Coniacian
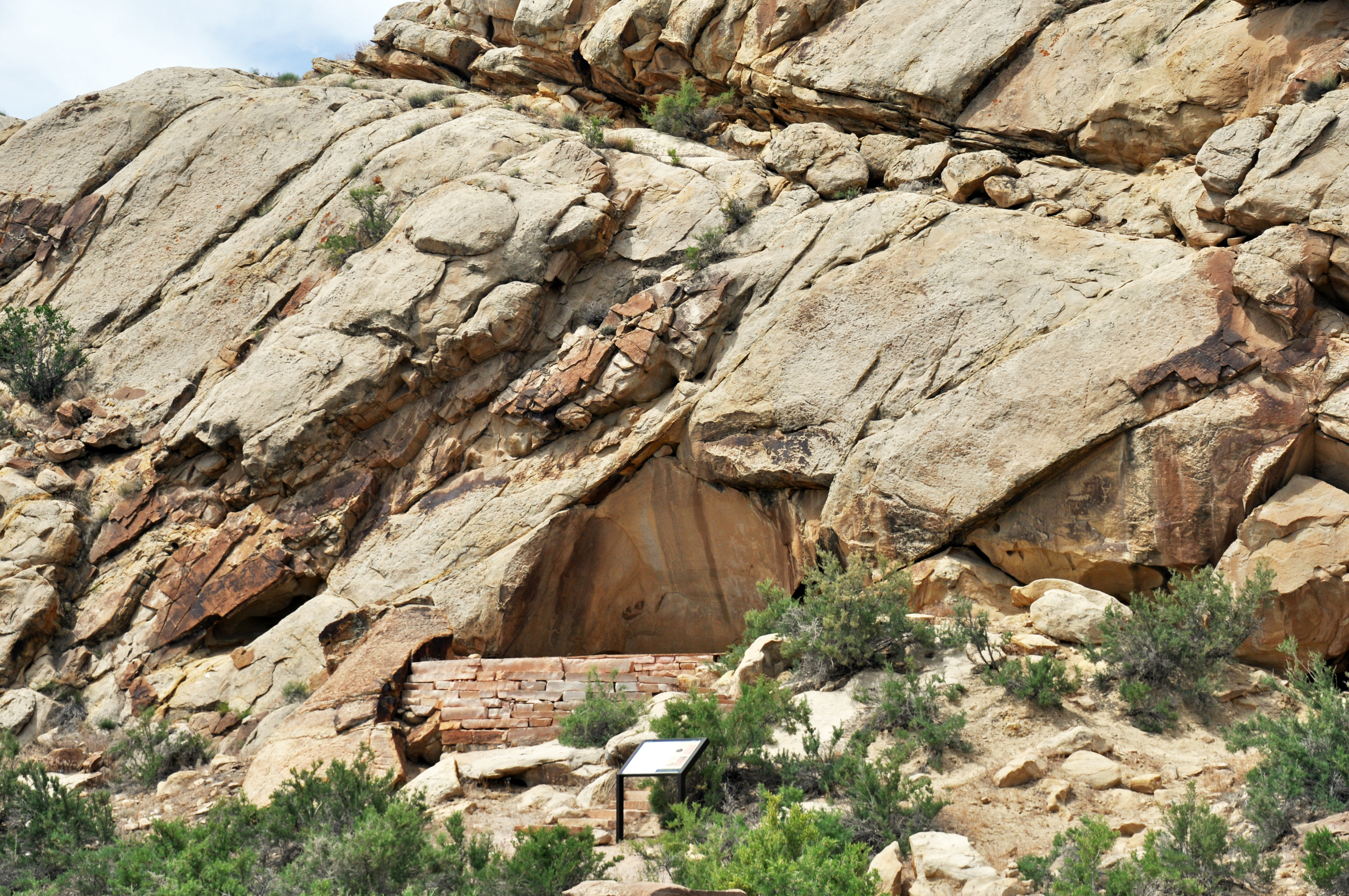
- Frontier Formation in Utah (Dinosaur National Monument)
- Type: Geological formation
- Sub-units: Torchlight Sandstone Member, Peay Sandstone Member
- Underlies: Cody Shale
- Overlies: Mowry Shale, Thermopolis Shale

Lithology
- Primary: Sandstone
- Other: Shale

Location
- Region: North America
- Country: United States
- Extent: see text

Type section
- Named by: W. C. Knight, 1902

Giant concretions in the Frontier Formation, northern end of the San Rafael Swell, Emery County, Utah.

The Frontier Formation is a sedimentary geological formation whose strata date back to the Late Cretaceous. The formation's extents are: northwest Colorado, southeast Idaho, southern Montana, northern Utah, and western Wyoming. It occurs in many sedimentary basins and uplifted areas.

The formation is described by W.G. Pierce as thick, lenticular, grey sandstone, gray shale, carbonaceous shale, and bentonite.

Dinosaur remains are among the fossils that have been recovered from the formation.

== Vertebrate paleofauna ==
- Nodosaurus textilis
- Stegopelta landerensis - "Partial postcranium, osteoderms, [and] fragments of skull."
- Hadrosauroidea indet. Footprints (Upper)

== Other paleofauna ==
- Callichimaera perplexa
- Collignoniceras woollgari

== See also ==
- List of dinosaur-bearing rock formations
