= Carlile Shale =

Geologic formation in the western US

- Stratigraphic range: Turonian; ~93.9–89.8 Ma
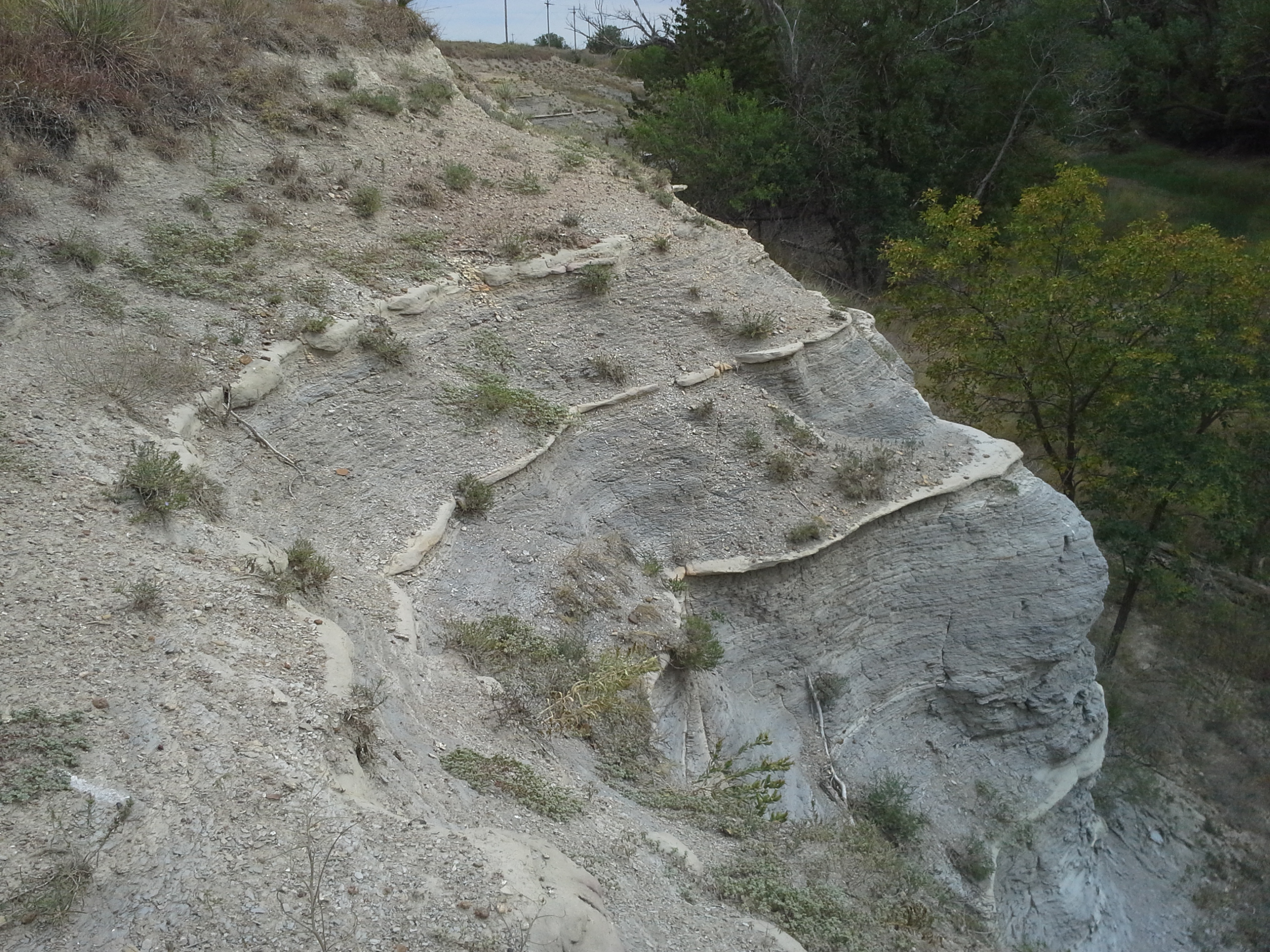
- Rare exposure of the Fairport Chalk member of the Carlile Shale in southern Ellis County, Kansas
- Type: Geological formation
- Unit of: Colorado Group (lower); or Benton Formation; Mancos Group (NM)
- Sub-units: Juana Lopez (CO, NM); Codell Sandstone; Blue Hill Shale; Fairport Chalk
- Underlies: Niobrara Formation
- Overlies: Greenhorn Limestone
- Thickness: 170–230 feet (52–70 m)

Lithology
- Primary: Shale, chalky to carbonaceous
- Other: Limestone; Sandstone; Siltstone; Septarians; Bentonite

Location
- Coordinates: 38.376°N 104.979°W
- Region: Mid-continental
- Country: United States

Type section
- Named for: Carlile Spring and Carlile Station, 21 mi west of Pueblo, Colorado
- Named by: Gilbert
- Year defined: 1896
- Carlile Shale (the United States) Carlile Shale (Colorado)

The Carlile Shale is a Turonian age Upper/Late Cretaceous series shale geologic formation in the central-western United States, including in the Great Plains region of Colorado, Kansas, Nebraska, New Mexico, North Dakota, South Dakota, and Wyoming.

== History of investigation ==
The Carlile Shale was first named by Grove Karl Gilbert for exposures at Carlile Spring, located about 21 miles (34 km) west of Pueblo, Colorado. He described it as a medium gray shale, capped with limestone or sandstone, and assigned it to the Benton Group. By 1931, William Walden Rubey and his coinvestigators had mapped it into Kansas and the Black Hills. Rubey also first assigned it to the Colorado Group. C.H. Dane assigned it to the Mancos Shale in New Mexico in 1948.

== Description ==
The formation is composed of marine deposits of the generally retreating phase (hemi-cycle) of the Greenhorn cycle of the Western Interior Seaway, which followed the advancing phase of the same cycle that formed the underlying Graneros Shale and Greenhorn Formation. As such, the lithology progresses from open ocean chalky shale (with thin limestones) to increasing carbonaceous shale to near-shore sandstone. Near the center of the seaway, currents in the remnant shallows sorted skeletal remains into a mass of calcareous sand. The contact between the Carlile Shale and the overlying Niobrara Formation is marked by an unconformity in much of the outcrop area, but where an unconformity is not discernible, the boundary is typically placed at the first resistant, fine-grained limestone bed at the base of the Niobrara Formation.

== Gallery ==
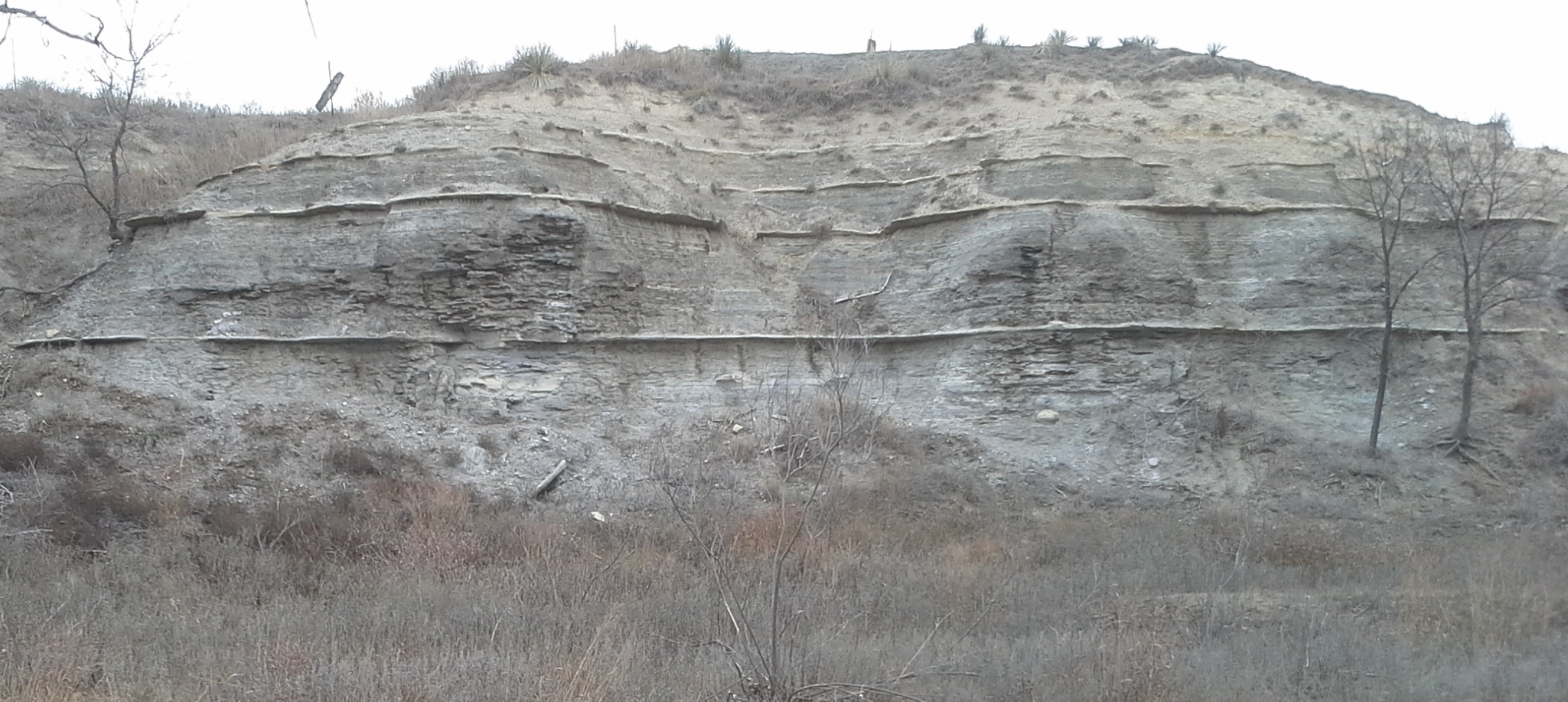
The lower 25 feet (7.6 m) of the Fairport Chalk member in southern Ellis County, Kansas.

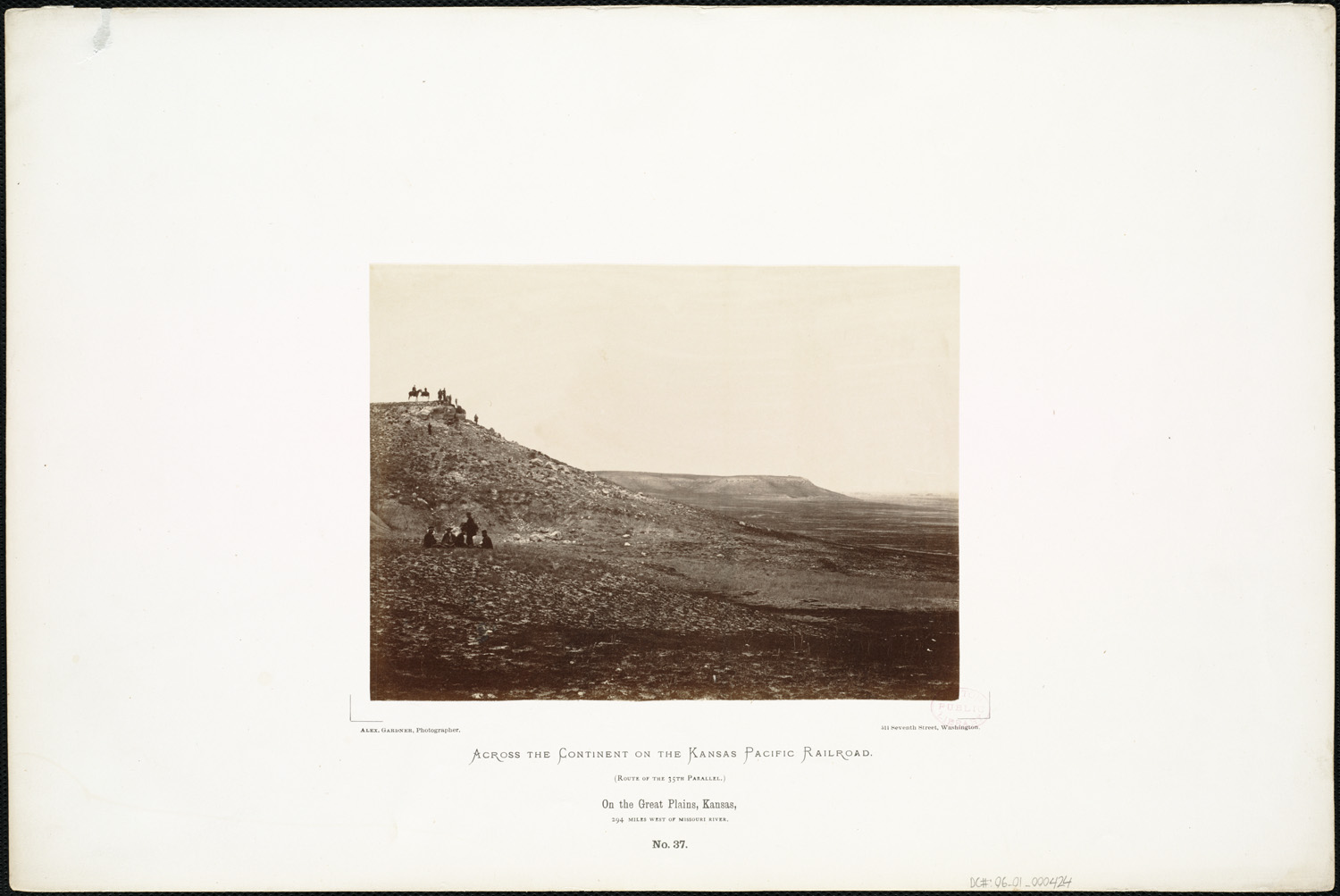
1867, bluffs west of Hays, behind the seated soldiers is pre-settlement digging in the Blue Hill Shale, possibly for selenite.

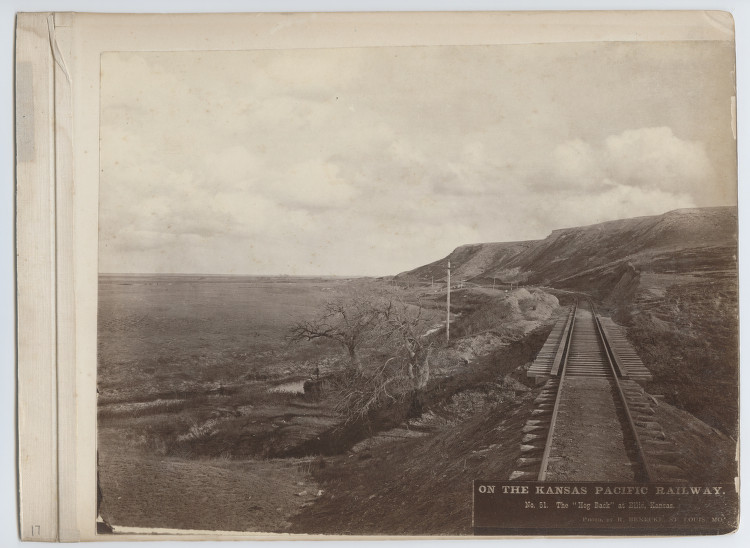
The bare Blue Hill Shale slopes at Yocemento as they appeared in 1873 to Robert Benecke.

== Fossil content ==
Upper Turonian series plesiosaur remains are among the fossils that have been recovered from the strata of its Blue Hill Shale Member in Kansas. The Carlile in eastern South Dakota contains shark teeth, fossil wood and leaves, and ammonites.

=== Reptiles ===
==== Crocodyliforms ====
Crocodyliforms
Genus	Species	Location	Stratigraphic position	Material	Notes	Images
Terminonaris	T. cf. T. browni	Russell County, Kansas.	Fairport Chalk Member.	A partial rostrum.	A pholidosaur.	

==== Plesiosaurs ====
Plesiosaurs
Genus	Species	Location	Stratigraphic position	Material	Notes	Images
Megacephalosaurus	M. eulerti	Near Fairport, Kansas.	Fairport Chalk Member.	A skull & anterior cervical material (FHSM VP-321).	A pliosaurid.	
Plesiosauria		Mitchell County, Kansas.	Blue Hill Member.	Portions of a rib (FHSM VP-17299).	May represent a large elasmosaur or pliosaur.	

==== Squamates ====
Squamates
Genus	Species	Location	Stratigraphic position	Material	Notes	Images
Coniasaurus	C. cf. C. crassidens	Russell County, Kansas.	Fairport Chalk Member.	2 incomplete vertebrae (FHSM VP-4418).	A dolichosaurid.	
Russellosaurina		Ellis County, Kansas.	Middle of the Fairport Chalk Member.	7 successive proximal caudal vertebrae (FHSM VP-17564).	A russellosaurine mosasaur.	

=== Fish ===
==== Cartilaginous fish ====
Cartilaginous fish
Genus	Species	Location	Stratigraphic position	Material	Notes	Images
Cretodus	C. houghtonorum	North-central Kansas.	Blue Hill Shale.	A partial skeleton consisting of 134 disarticulated teeth, 61 vertebrae, 23 placoid scales, and fragments of calcified cartilage.	A mackerel shark.	
Cretoxyrhina	C. mantelli	Dixon County, Nebraska.	Fairport Chalky Shale Member.	A tooth (UNSM 129549).	A large mackerel shark.	
Ptychodus	P. latissimus	Kansas.	Codell Sandstone Member.	3 teeth.	A ptychodontid.	
Ptychodus	P. mammillaris	North of Schoenchen, Ellis County, Kansas.	Fairport Chalk Member.	A medial tooth (FHSM VP-15284).	A ptychodontid.	
Ptychodus	P. sp.	Ellis County, Kansas.	Blue Hill Shale Member.	A tooth contained in a coprolite (FHSM VP-13325).	A ptychodontid.	

== See also ==
- Volcanic mineralization of the Greenhorn cycle:
  - Bentonite, sedimentary volcanic ash (named for the original Graneros/Greenhorn/Carlile classification), generally showing some weathered iron stain in the Colorado Group
  - Pyrite, precipitation of volcanic sulfuric acid with oceanic iron as FeS_{2}
  - Limonite, pyrite in limestone weathered to HFeO_{2} (rust stain or yellow ochre)
  - Selenite, CaSO_{4} associated with Bentonite seams and ochre
- Plesiosaur stratigraphic distribution
