= Greenhorn Limestone =

Geologic formation in the United States

- Stratigraphic range: Cenomanian-Turonian, around 94.3–89.3 Ma
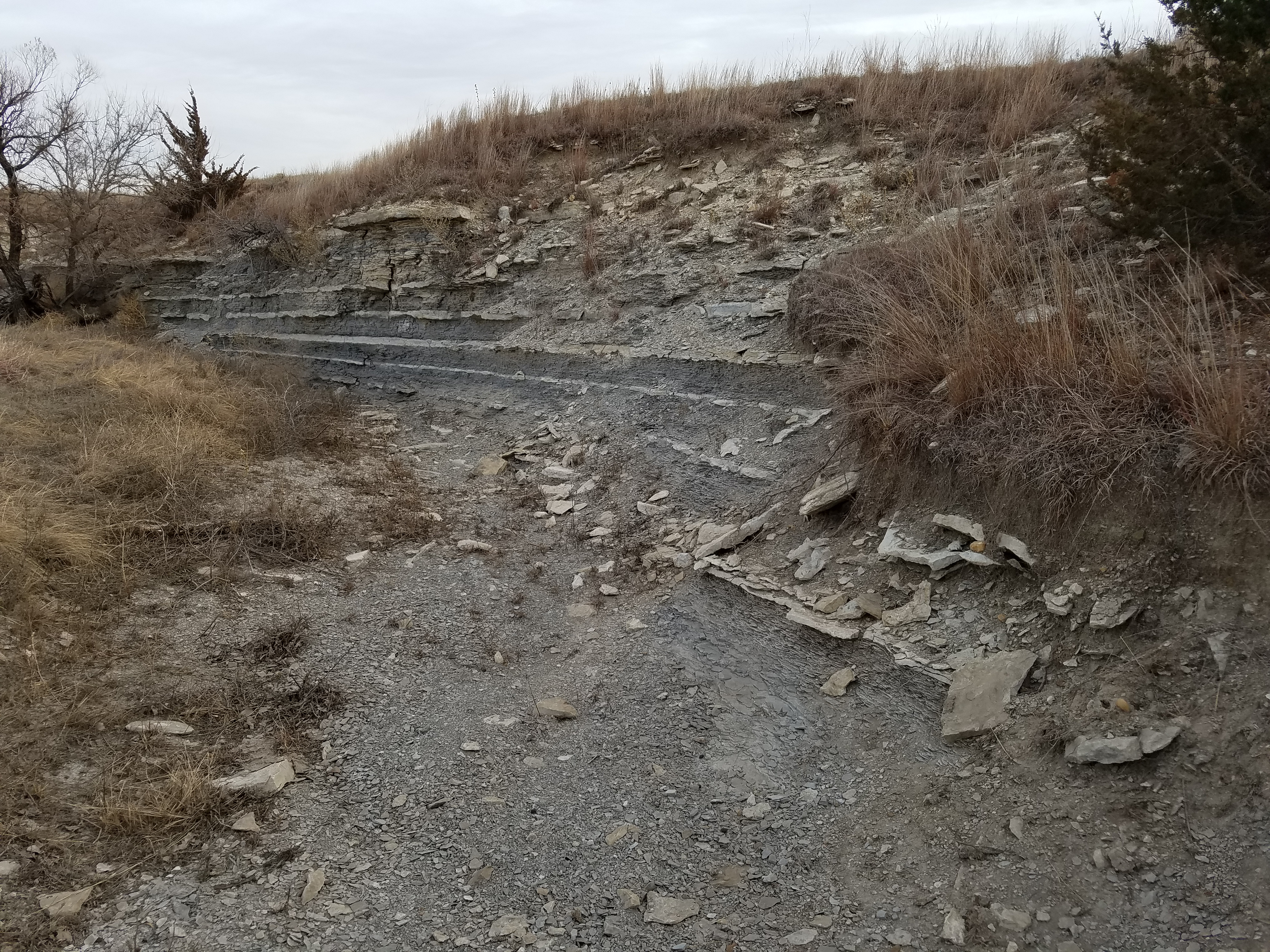
- The Jetmore Chalk Member of the Greenhorn Formation in Kansas.
- Type: Formation
- Unit of: Colorado Group (lower), Benton Formation/Group, Mancos Shale (lower), or Cody Shale
- Sub-units: Colorado members: Bridge Creek Limestone; Hartland Shale; Lincoln Limestone; Kansas members: Pfeifer Shale (with Fencepost ls); Jetmore Chalk; Hartland Shale; Lincoln Limestone
- Underlies: Carlile Shale
- Overlies: Graneros Shale

Lithology
- Primary: Shale to chalky shale Limestone, chalk to marl
- Other: bentonite

Location
- Coordinates: 38.277°N 104.713°W
- Region: mid-continental
- Country: United States

Type section
- Named for: Greenhorn Station, 14 mi south of Pueblo, CO, and for Greenhorn Creek
- Named by: Grove Karl Gilbert
- Year defined: 1896
- Greenhorn Limestone (the United States) Greenhorn Limestone (Colorado)

The Greenhorn Limestone or Greenhorn Formation is a geologic formation in the Great Plains Region of the United States, dating to the Cenomanian and Turonian ages of the Late Cretaceous period. The formation gives its name to the Greenhorn cycle of the Western Interior Seaway.

== Description ==
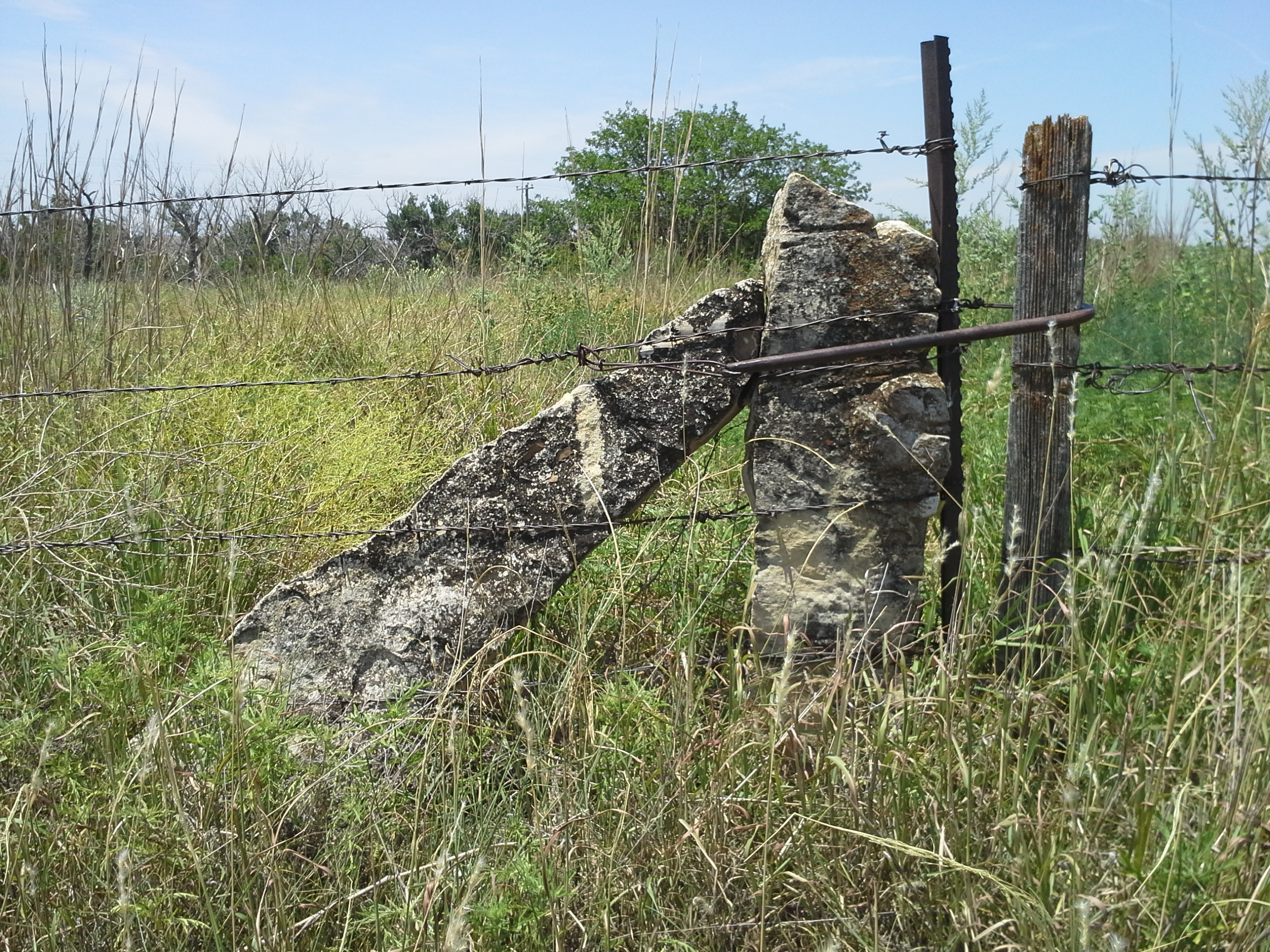
The iconic stone posts of Kansas were cut from a layer in the Greenhorn.

The formation was named for the Greenhorn Station on Greenhorn Creek in Colorado in 1896 by Grove Karl Gilbert; and it is the namesake of the Greenhorn Marine Cycle of the Cretaceous Western Interior Seaway. With the underlying Graneros Shale and Dakota Formation, it records the progressive stage of Greenhorn Marine Cycle while the overlying Carlile Shale records the regressive stage.

The Greenhorn unit name is recognized in the Great Plains Region from Minnesota and Iowa to New Mexico to Montana and the Dakotas. In much of Alberta and Saskatchewan, the "Second White-Specked Shale" contains limy equivalents of the Greenhorn.

In Kansas, the Greenhorn Formation is divided into the (lowest) Lincoln Limestone, Hartland Shale, Jetmore Chalk, and (highest) Pfeifer shale members, each noted by changes in chalkiness and limestone rhythmite patterns. In eastern Colorado and western Kansas Hydrocarbon exploration, the divisions are Lincoln Limestone, Hartford Shale, and Bridge Creek Limestone. In other states, where the formation is less developed, the unit is not subdivided and is named the Greenhorn Limestone, as a formation or as a member of another formation, e.g., Cody Shale, Colorado Shale, and Mancos Shale.

Within Kansas and a small neighboring portion of Nebraska, the Greenhorn Formation is particularly noted for its uppermost bed, the Fencepost limestone, from which the Kansas stone posts were quarried. The combination of the toughness of the Fencepost limestone with the softness of the chalk and shale above and below as resulted in the formation of the main range of the Smoky Hills north and west of Salina. In 2018, Kansas Legislation HB 2650 designated the Greenhorn Limestone formation, specifically "the famous "post rock" limestone" bed of that unit, to be the state rock of Kansas.

== Lithologic character ==
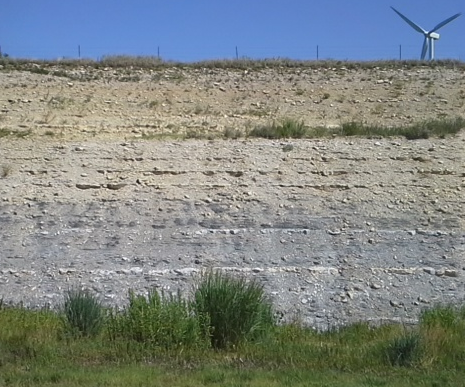
This I-70 road cut shows the chalky rhythmites of the formation.

The Greenhorn Formation is characterized as shale to chalky shale, light bluish-gray in color, with rhythmically repeating beds of chalk or limestone that become marly closer to the Rocky Mountains. The shale can weather to buff color under hilltops.

Exposures show many thin, rust-colored bentonite beds (named for the Old Benton Limestone classification that the Greenhorn and other names replaced), several of which are consistent and widespread marker beds. These orange seams in the weathered shale and the yellow/orange stainings of some of the weathered limestones in the Greenhorn are associated with volcanic events in the Sevier orogeny. The oceanic iron (Fe) and volcanic sulfur (S) that precipitated with the volcanic ash into the calcareous mud (CaCO_{3}) formed pyrite (FeS_{2}), which later altered to selenite (CaSO_{4}·2H_{2}O), siderite (FeCO_{3}), and limonite (FeO(OH)·nH_{2}O), leading to the yellow to orange staining.

== Paleofauna ==
The formation is recognized for its sequence of index fossils, including oysters, Ammonoidea, Belemnitida, and Inoceramidae.

- Ammonoidea and Belemnitida were common, free-swimming pelagic predators, reflecting abundant fish populations in a broad sea.
- The occasionally low oxygen bottom was soft mud to which the broad, flat Inoceramidae were particularly adapted. These stationary filter feeders are evidence of currents sufficient to carry enough food to support such very large invertebrates, but not so strong as to suffocated them with drifting mud.
- Oysters are smaller filter feeders. Several species were common. Larval oysters require clear, mud-free hard surfaces to attach and develop into mature oysters. Ostrea congesta was particular for colonizing the top valve of large Inoceramidae and oyster-encrusted shell fragments litter slopes of eroded Greenhorn.
- In 2022, Schumacher & Everhart described Plesioelasmosaurus based on a partial skeleton previously known as the "Holyrood elasmosaur" from the Greenhorn Limestone (Lincoln Limestone Member, Calcarenite beds).

The Greenhorn marine cycle was the deepest and broadest stage of the Western Interior Seaway, and supported large sharks and the largest of marine reptiles, including Mosasauridae and Pliosauroidea.

Fossilized driftwood and dinosaur remains have been recovered from the formation; such remains are presumed washed into the sea by rivers swollen by the heavy rainfalls of the hothouse Cretaceous.

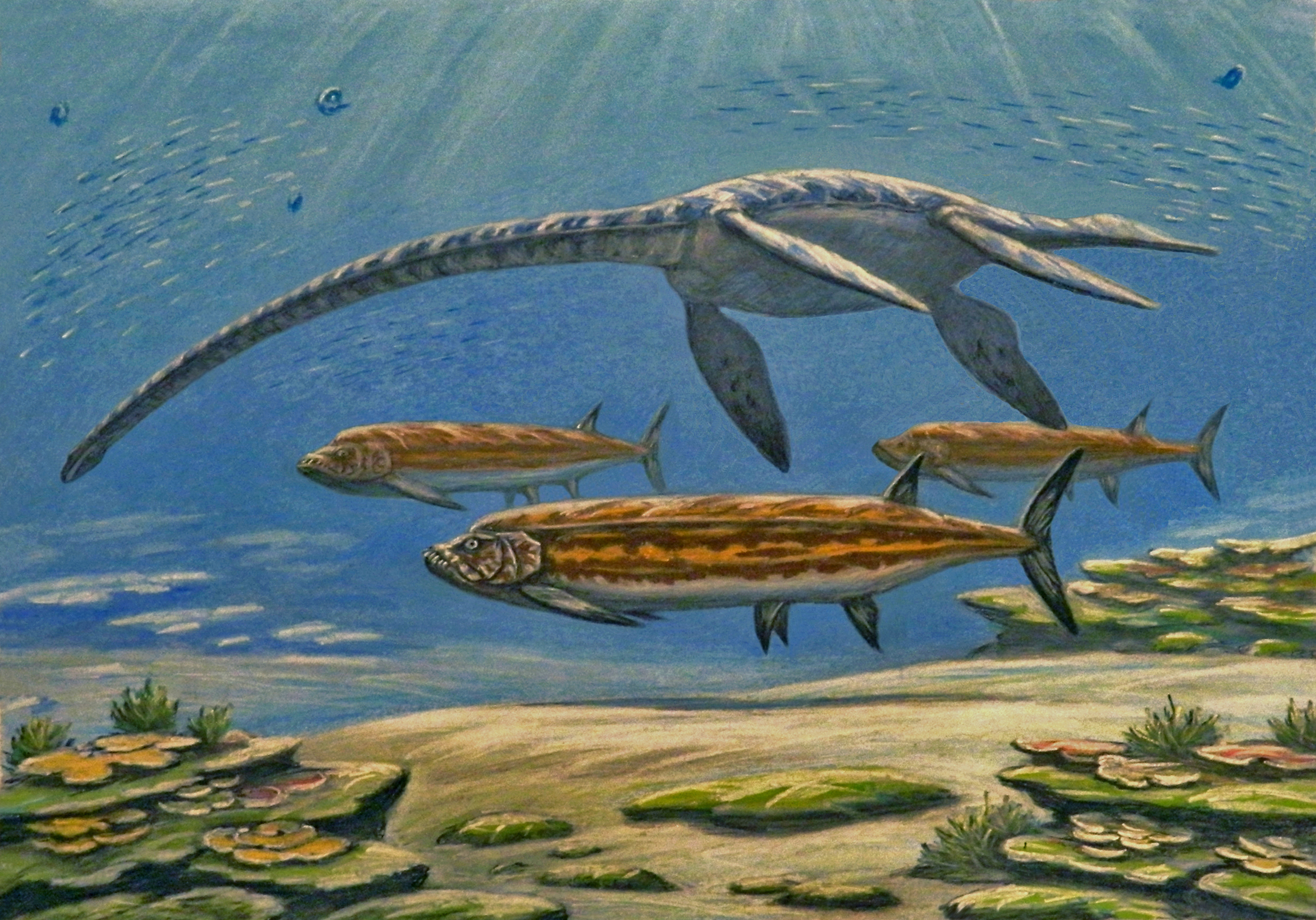
Paleoart depicting two large marine predators of the late Cretaceous; Elasmosauridae and Xiphactinus.

== See also ==
- Volcanic mineralization of the Greenhorn sequence:
  - Bentonite, sedimentary volcanic ash, general showing some weathered iron stain in the Colorado Group
  - Pyrite, precipitation of volcanic sulfuric acid with oceanic iron as FeS_{2}
  - Limonite, pyrite in limestone weathered to HFeO_{2} (rust stain or yellow ochre)
  - Selenite, CaSO_{4} associated with Bentonite seams and ochre
- List of dinosaur-bearing rock formations
- List of fossiliferous stratigraphic units in Colorado
- List of fossiliferous stratigraphic units in Kansas
- List of fossiliferous stratigraphic units in Minnesota
- Paleontology in Colorado
- Paleontology in Kansas
- Paleontology in Minnesota
