= Belle Fourche Formation =

Geologic formation classification in Wyoming

- Stratigraphic range: Cretaceous
- Type: Formation

Location
- Region: Montana, North Dakota, South Dakota, Wyoming
- Country: United States

The Belle Fourche Formation or Belle Fourche Shale is a fossiliferous early Late-Cretaceous geologic formation classification in Wyoming. Named for outcrops in Belle Fourche River, Wyoming, this unit name is also used in Montana, North Dakota, and South Dakota.

The unit records the gradual opening and expansion of the Greenhorn Cycle of the Western Interior Seaway, and as such is lithologically identical to the Graneros Shale Formation (that is, it is the same formation under a different name).

== See also ==
- List of fossiliferous stratigraphic units in Montana
- Paleontology in Montana
- Paleontology in North Dakota
- Paleontology in South Dakota
- Paleontology in Wyoming
