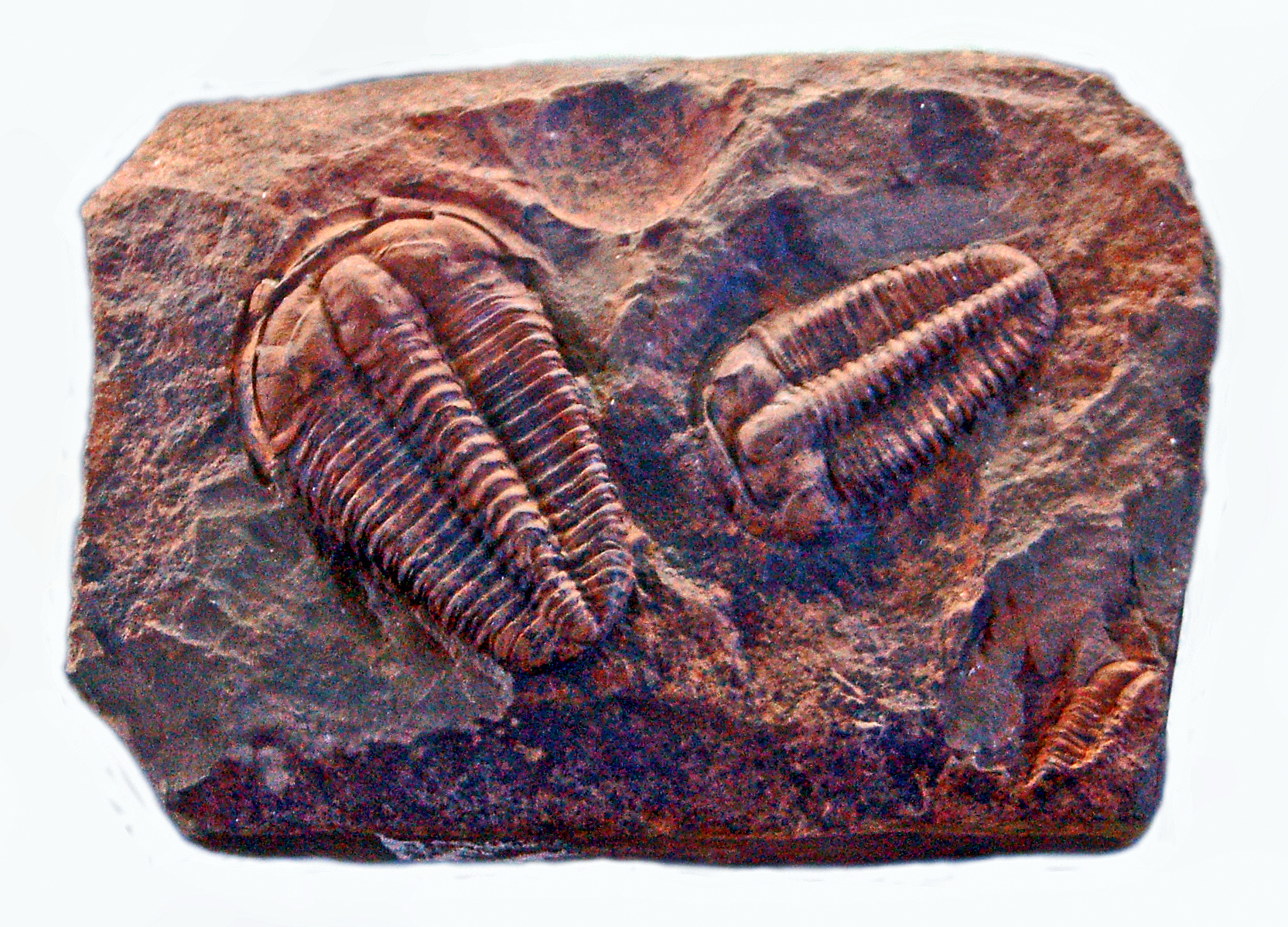
- Ptychoparia striata from Czech Republic, at the National Museum (Prague)

Scientific classification
- Kingdom: Animalia
- Phylum: Arthropoda
- Clade: †Artiopoda
- Class: †Trilobita
- Order: †Ptychopariida
- Family: †Ptychopariidae
- Genus: †Ptychoparia; Hawle and Corda, 1847

Type species
- Conocephalus striatus

Species
- P. striata (Emmrich, 1839) = Conocephalus striatus, Trilobites sulzeri var. γ, P. gracilis, P. lobifera, Lobocephalus cylindricus; P. dubinka Kordule, 2006; P. tuberosa Feniak, 1952; P. clusia Walcott, 1917; P. homfrayi (Hicks [Salter ms.]), 1872

= Ptychoparia =

Ptychoparia Temporal range: Middle Cambrian

Extinct genus of trilobites

Ptychoparia is a genus of ptychopariid trilobites, and is the type genus of the family Ptychopariidae, and the order Ptychopariida.

Fossils of the various species are found in Middle Cambrian-aged marine strata of Eurasia and North America, about 513 ± 0.3 to 499 ± 1.7 million years ago.

== Description ==
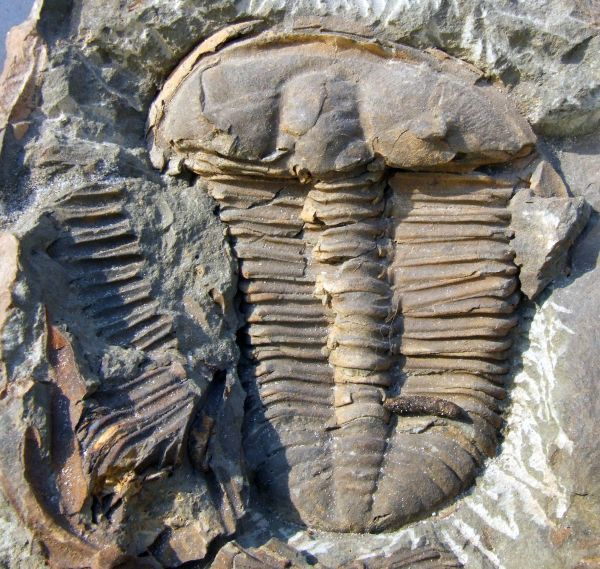
Ptychoparia striata

Like all Ptychopariidae, the dorsal exoskeleton in Ptychoparia has an inverse egg-shaped outline. The central raised axis, that is defined by a furrow, is moderately convex and narrow, at its widest about 1/8 of the maximum width of the headshield (or cephalon). The part of the axis in the cephalon, called glabella, tapers forward, is rounded-truncate at its front, is inserted by for pairs of furrows that do not contact across the midline, and one at the back that defines the occipital ring. The fourth pair of lateral furrows curve strongly inward until parallel with the midline. A border is defined by a furrow running parallel to the margin of the cephalon, and this border furrow is deep at the front. The areas outside the axis are almost flat. Between the front of the glabella and the border, is a somewhat convex area of the cheek that is comparable in length (along the midline) to the occipital ring. In well preserved specimens the cheeks in front of the eye are adorned with very fine ridges (or striae) that probably represent parts of the digestive system (see Kordule, 2006, p. 283, figure 2.a/f). The eye ridges are threadlike, evenly curved, extending from the anterior corners of the glabella to halfway the genal angles, while the visual surface makes an abrupt angle, is shaped like a bracket parallel to the midline and ±1/8 of the length of the cephalon. Like in most trilobites, the division between the outer free cheek (or librigena) and the inner fixed cheek (or fixigena) is a line (or suture) where the exoskeleton splits to assist in moulting. It always follows the inside of the visual surface of the eye. In Ptychoparia, the part of this suture behind the eye cuts to the posterior margin just to the inside of the genal spine (or the suture is gonatoparian), and the part in front of the eye diverges from the midline. There is a spine in the back corners of the cephalon (or genal spine) that reaches approximately to the third thorax segment, and is confluent with the outer margin of the cephalon. The articulate midsection of the body (or thorax) has 13 (P. striata) or 14 (P. dubinka) segments. Tail shield (or pygidium) is slightly over half as wide as the cephalon (a state called micropygous). The pygidial axis (or rachis) has 5 or 6 rings and a termination and 4 or 5 ribs in the outlying pleural regions. The pygidium in Ptychoparia lacks a border.

== Distribution ==
Fossils have been found in Middle Cambrian marine strata of the Czech Republic, India, Mexico, Norway, South Korea, the United Kingdom, United States (Montana, New York, Virginia, and possibly Pennsylvania).

=== Reassigned species ===
Several species of trilobite that were originally assigned to Ptychoparia have now been moved to other genera.

- P. annio = Angusteva annio
- P. attleborensis = Hebediscus attleborensis
- P. batia = Chuangia batia
- P. breviceps = Oligometopus breviceps
- P. carolinensis = Etheridgaspis carolinensis
- P. enantiopa = Enantiaspis enantiopa
- P. fitchi = Hamptonella fitchi
- P. housensis = Bolaspidella housensis
- P. laeviceps = Asaphiscus laeviceps
- P. ligea = Probowmania ligea
- P. linnarssoni = Eldoradia linnarssoni
- P. llanoensis = Orygmaspis llanoensis
- P. matheri = Elvinia roemeri
- P. meglitzkii = Triangulaspis meglitzkii
- P. metra = Meteoraspis metra
- P. mutica = Mikaparia mutica
- P. occidentalis = Elrathia occidentalis
- P. oweni = Modocia nevadensis
- P. panope = Deadwoodia panope
- P. pernasutus = Dokimocephalus pernasutus
- P. pero = Wilbernia pero
- P. pia = Piaziella pia
- P. piochensis = Alokistocare piochensis
- P. prospectensis = Eldoradia prospectensis
- P. roemeri = Elvinia roemeri
- P. rogersi = Braintreella rogersi
- P. similis = Iddingsia similis
- P. spinifera = Annamitia spinifera
- P. suada = Dellea wilbernsensis
- P. subcoronatus = Alokistocare subcoronatum
- P. titiana = Inouyops titiana
- P. theano = Emmrichella theano
- P. toxeus = Solenoparia toxeus
- P. urania = Burnetiella urania
- P. unisulcata = Elvinia roemeri
- P. yunnanensis = Yunnanocephalus yunnanensis
