= Eoproetus =

Eoproetus Temporal range: Cambrian

Scientific classification
- Kingdom: Animalia
- Phylum: Arthropoda
- Clade: †Artiopoda
- Class: †Trilobita
- Order: †Ptychopariida
- Family: †Asaphiscidae
- Genus: †Eoproetus; Zhang & Wang, 1983

Extinct genus of trilobite

Eoproetus is an extinct genus of ptychopariid trilobite in the family Ptychopariidae. It lived what is now China during the Cambrian Period, which lasted from approximately 539 to 485 million years ago.
