= Mangelia albicincta =

Scientific classification
- Kingdom: Animalia
- Phylum: Mollusca
- Class: Gastropoda
- Subclass: Caenogastropoda
- Order: Neogastropoda
- Superfamily: Conoidea
- Family: Mangeliidae
- Genus: Mangelia
- Species: M. albicincta

Binomial name
- Mangelia albicincta A.A. Gould, 1860

Species of gastropod

Mangelia albicincta is a species of sea snail, a marine gastropod mollusk in the family Mangeliidae.

This species was collected by William Stimpson, during the North Pacific Exploring Expedition. The type was destroyed in the 1871 Great Chicago Fire.

== Description ==
The length of the shell attains 4 mm, its diameter is 2 mm.

== Distribution ==
This marine species occurs off the Ryukyus, Japan.
