= Kolpura =

Kolpura Temporal range: Cambrian

Scientific classification
- Kingdom: Animalia
- Phylum: Arthropoda
- Class: Trilobita
- Order: Ptychopariida
- Superfamily: Ptychoparioidea
- Family: Proasaphiscidae
- Genus: Kolpura Resser & Endo, 1935

Kolpura is an extinct genus from a well-known class of fossil marine arthropods, the trilobites. It lived during the Cambrian Period, which lasted from approximately 542 to 488 million years ago.
