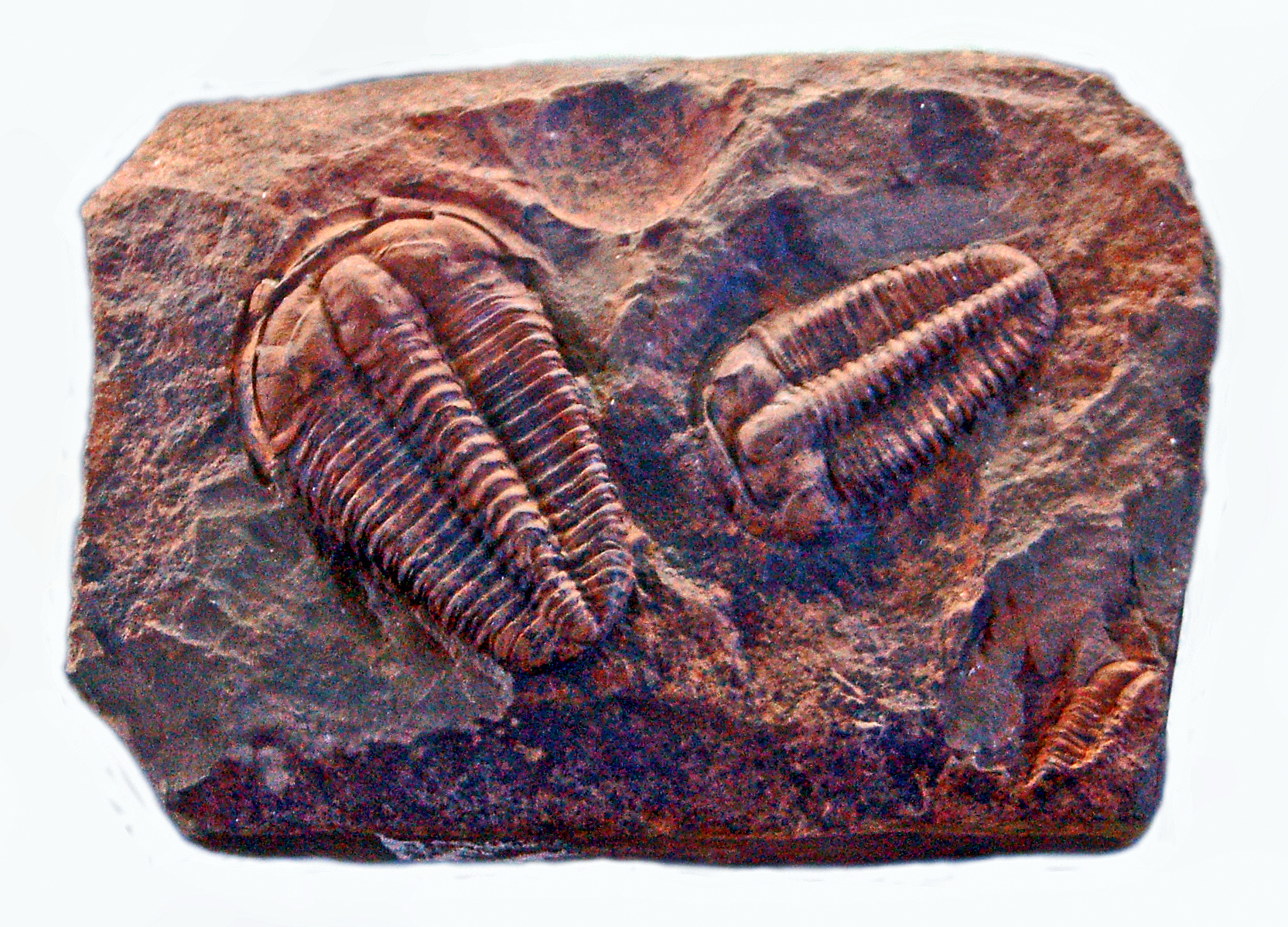
- Ptychoparia striata from Czech Republic, at the National Museum (Prague)

Scientific classification
- Kingdom: Animalia
- Phylum: Arthropoda
- Clade: †Artiopoda
- Class: †Trilobita
- Order: †Ptychopariida
- Suborder: †Ptychopariina
- Superfamily: †Ptychoparioidea
- Family: †Ptychopariidae; Matthew, 1887

= Ptychopariidae =

Ptychopariidae is a family of trilobites, containing the following genera:

- Achlysopsis
- Altikolia
- Altitudella
- Amecephalites
- Asthenopsis
- Austinvillia
- Balangcunaspis
- Bashania
- Bathyholcus
- Bathyocos
- Billingsaspis
- Binodaspis
- Blairella – see Neoblairella
- Bolaspidina
- Brunswickia
- Bulkuraspis
- Caborcella
- Callidaspina
- Callidaspis
- Cathayanella
- Champlainia
- Chengshanaspis
- Chinghisicus
- Chunghwaella
- Conopolus
- Dananzhuangia
- Deltina
- Douposiella
- Elrathina
- Entsyna
- Eodouposiella
- Eokochaspis
- Eosoptychoparia
- Eospencia
- Eurostina
- Finecrestia
- Gaotanaspis
- Gaphuraspis
- Gedongaspis
- Gunnia
- Hadrocephalites
- Hadrokraspedon
- Hamptonella
- Hejinaspis
- Hemicricometopus
- Hewenia
- Holasaphus
- Horbusonia
- Illtydaspis
- Jangudaspis
- Jialaopsis
- Jianchangia
- Jimaoshania
- Jiumenia
- Kermanella
- Kochaspis
- Kochiella
- Kochiellina
- Kochina
- Kounamkites
- Kunmingaspis
- Laminurus
- Laoyingshania
- Lianglangshania
- Loriella
- Luguoia
- Luxella
- Lyriaspis
- Majiangia
- Manailina
- Meitania
- Metisella – see Rasettiella
- Mexicella
- Monanocephalus
- Mopanshania
- Mrassina
- Mufushania
- Nangaocephalus
- Nangaoia
- Nangaops
- Nanoqia
- Nassovia
- Nelsonia – see Paleonelsonia
- Neoblairella
- Neoregina
- Neokochina
- Nyella – Palmerara
- Olenekina
- Onchocephalites
- Ontoella
- Orienturus
- Orlovia
- Orloviella
- Pachyaspidella
- Pachyaspis
- Palmerara
- Palmeraspis
- Paleonelsonia
- Panacus
- Paraeosoptychoparia
- Paragunnia
- Paramecephalus
- Paraperiomma
- Paraplagiura
- Parapoulsenia
- Parashuiyuella
- Paraziboaspis
- Perimetopus
- Periommella
- Piazella
- Pingluaspis
- Piochaspis
- Plagiura
- Pokrovskayaspis
- Poulsenella
- Poulsenia
- Poulseniella
- Probowmania
- Probowmaniella
- Probowmanops
- Proliostracus
- Promeitania
- ?Protohedinia
- Pseudoliostracus
- Psilostracus
- Ptychoparella
- Ptychoparia
- Qiaotouaspis
- Qingshuiheia
- Rasettiella
- Reedus
- Regina – Neoregina
- Regius
- Runnania
- Salankanaspis
- Sanhuangshania
- Sanwania
- Schistometopus
- Semisphaerocephalus
- Seriaspis
- Shanganella
- Shantungaspis
- Shuiyuella
- Sinoptychoparia
- Spencella
- Spencia
- Stoecklinia
- Sujaraspis
- Suluktella
- Taijiangia
- Taniaspidella
- Townleyella
- Trachyostracus
- Trigonyangaspis
- Tukalandaspis
- ?Ulrichaspis
- Variopelta
- Vermontella
- Vica
- Volocephalina
- Wanhuaia
- Weijiaspis
- Wuhaina
- Xiangshanaspis
- Xingrenaspis
- Yaoyiayuella
- Yohoaspis
- Yuknessaspis
- Ziboaspidella
- Ziboaspis
