= M. mercenaria =

M. mercenaria may refer to:

- Menippe mercenaria, the Florida stone crab, an edible crab species found in the western North Atlantic, from North Carolina to Belize, including Texas, the Gulf of Mexico, Cuba and the Bahamas
- Mercenaria mercenaria, the hard clam, quahog, round clam or hard-shell clam, an edible marine bivalve mollusk species native to the eastern shores of North America, from Prince Edward Island to the Yucatán Peninsula

== See also ==
- Mercenaria
