= Tosotychia =

Tosotychia Temporal range: Cambrian

Scientific classification
- Kingdom: Animalia
- Phylum: Arthropoda
- Class: Trilobita
- Order: Ptychopariida
- Superfamily: Ptychoparioidea
- Family: Papyriaspididae
- Genus: Tosotychia Öpik, 1961

Tosotychia is an extinct genus from a well-known class of fossil marine arthropods, the trilobites. It lived during the Cambrian Period, which lasted from approximately 539 to 485 million years ago.
