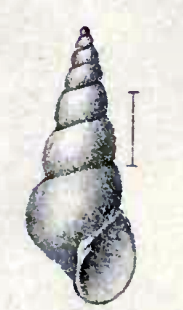
- Drawing of Odostomia dealbata

Scientific classification
- Kingdom: Animalia
- Phylum: Mollusca
- Class: Gastropoda
- Family: Pyramidellidae
- Genus: Odostomia
- Species: O. dealbata

Binomial name
- Odostomia dealbata (Stimpson, 1851)

= Odostomia dealbata =

Species of gastropod

Odostomia dealbata is a species of sea snail, a marine gastropod mollusc in the family Pyramidellidae, the pyrams and their allies.

This is a nomen nudum, a naked name that has not been published with an adequate description (or a reference to such a description). Therefore, it cannot be accepted as it currently stands.

== Description ==
The white shell is smooth and pellucid. There are six, rather convex whorls 6 with an inconspicuous fold The length of the shell is 4 mm.

== Distribution ==
This species occurs in the following locations:

- Northwest Atlantic

== Notes ==
Additional information regarding this species:

- Distribution: Range: 42.3°N to 41.3°N; 72°W to 71°W. Distribution: USA: Massachusetts, Connecticut
