= Henry Ulke =

Prussian-American photographer and painter

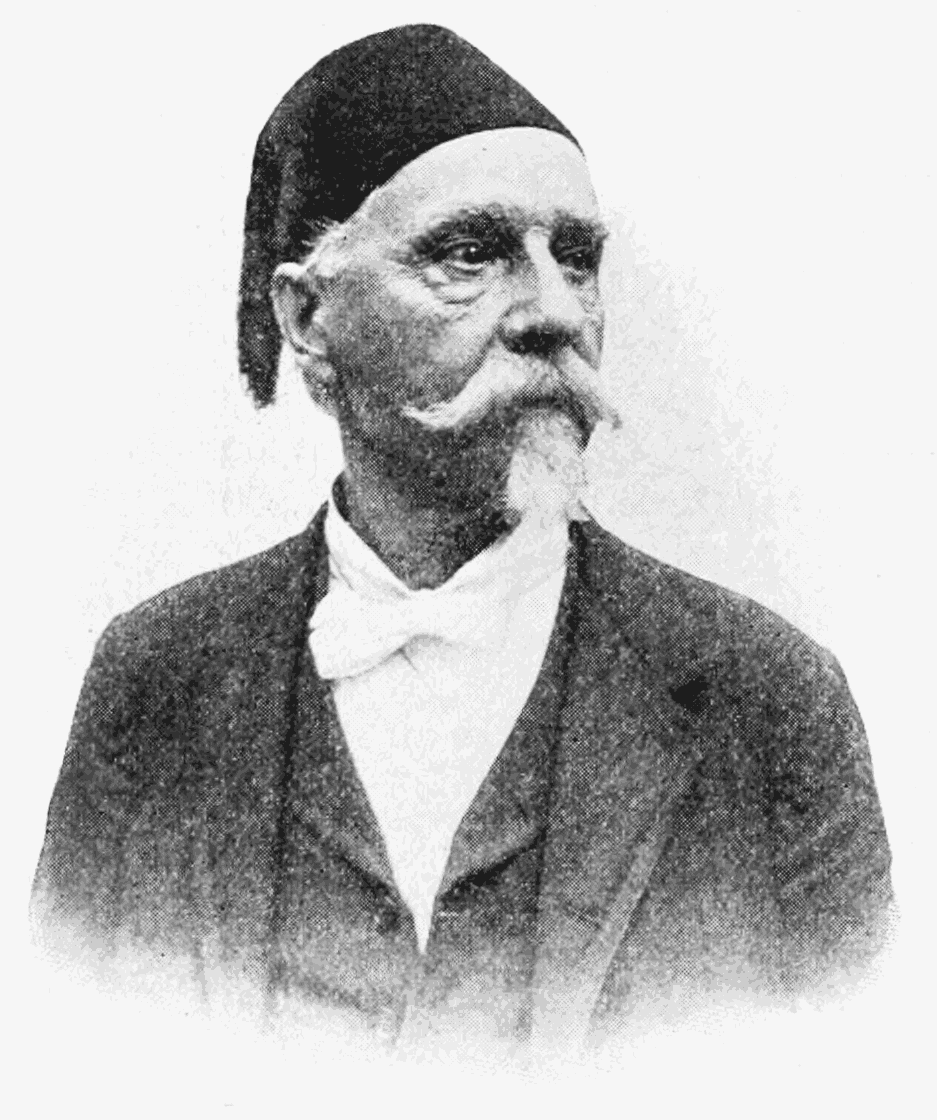
- Born: January 29, 1821; Frankenstein in Schlesien, Prussia
- Died: February 17, 1910 (aged 89); Washington, D.C., U.S.
- Resting place: Oak Hill Cemetery; Washington, D.C., U.S.
- Known for: "Painter of Presidents"

Henry Ulke (January 29, 1821 – February 17, 1910) was an American photographer and portrait painter.

== Biography ==
Henry Ulke was born in Frankenstein in Schlesien, Prussia, and studied painting in Breslau, and also in Berlin under Wach. For a time he was occupied in decorating the Royal Museum of Berlin, but became involved in the Revolution of 1848, and was compelled to leave his native land.

Ulke and his brothers Julian and Lee moved from Germany to the United States in 1852. Ulke worked in New York designing banknotes, then illustrations for Harper's and Leslie's weeklies in Philadelphia from approximately 1853 to 1860. They settled in Washington, D.C., in 1860, finding residence in the Petersen boarding house at 516 Tenth Street, NW, across the street from Ford's Theater, where President Abraham Lincoln was shot by John Wilkes Booth on April 14, 1865. It is presumed that Julian Ulke took a famous photo of the Petersen house room in which Lincoln died on the morning of April 15.

The brothers had a portrait studio in Washington, D.C. at 1111 Pennsylvania Avenue, N.W., around the corner from their boarding house. For 40 years, Ulke painted portraits of a series of American politicians, scientists and noteworthy individuals — some from his own photos. Portraits include Earls Elgin and Gray, Sir Frederick Bruce, Robert Kennicott, William Stimpson, Edwin M. Stanton, Charles Sumner, James G. Blaine, Treasury Secretaries Crawford, Taney, Bibb, Chase, and Carlisle, Generals Grant, Rawlins, and Blair, as well as Samuel D. Ingham (1893).

Ulke collected beetles, was a member of the Smithsonian Megatherium Club, and later the Entomological Society of Washington. His beetle collection has been called "one of the largest and most perfect collections of the beetles of North America in existence". He donated his collection to the Carnegie Museum. Ulke photographed Mary Lincoln in mourning after Willie Lincoln's death.

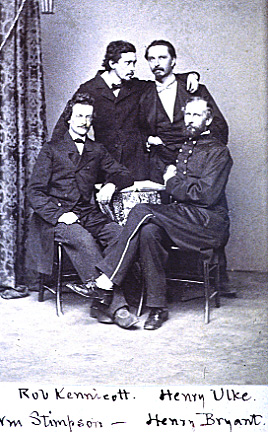
Henry Ulke, upper right — a member of the Megatherium Club, Smithsonian Institution, approximately 1864

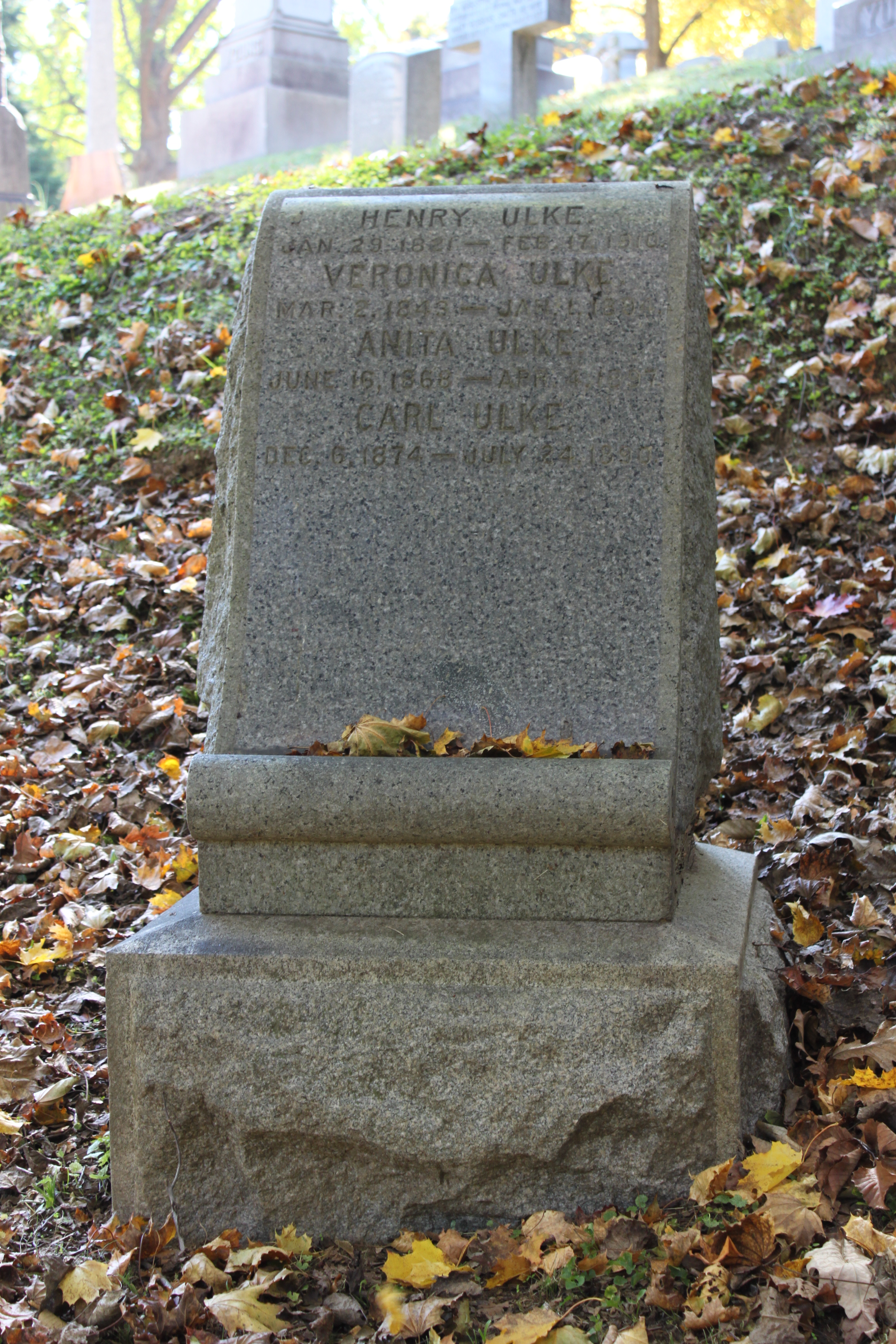
Grave of Ulke at Oak Hill Cemetery

Ulke died in Washington, D.C. in 1910. His New York Times obituary says, "Henry Ulke, whose portraits of Presidents and Cabinet Ministers at Washington gained for him the soubriquet of 'Painter of Presidents,' died ... as the result of a fall at his home... He was 89 years old. Mr. Ulke was a personal friend of Abraham Lincoln, and at the time of the assassination the dying President was carried into the famous Tenth Street house, where he was boarding. One of Mr. Ulke's best paintings was a portrait of President Grant, which now hangs in the long gallery of the White House..." Ulke was buried at Oak Hill Cemetery in Washington, D.C.

== Family ==
Ulke married Veronica Schultze in 1865.
