= Ehmaniella =

Ehmaniella Temporal range: Burgess Shale

Scientific classification
- Kingdom: Animalia
- Phylum: Arthropoda
- Clade: †Artiopoda
- Class: †Trilobita
- Order: †Ptychopariida
- Family: †Alokistocaridae
- Genus: †Ehmaniella; Resser, 1937

Genus of trilobites

Ehmaniella is a genus of trilobite known from the Middle Cambrian Burgess Shale. 392 specimens of Ehmaniella are known from the Greater Phyllopod bed, where they comprise 0.74% of the community.

Ehmaniella's major characteristics are a wide cranidium, heavy eye ridges, longitudinal striae on the pre-glabellar area, and a small pygidium with few segments.
