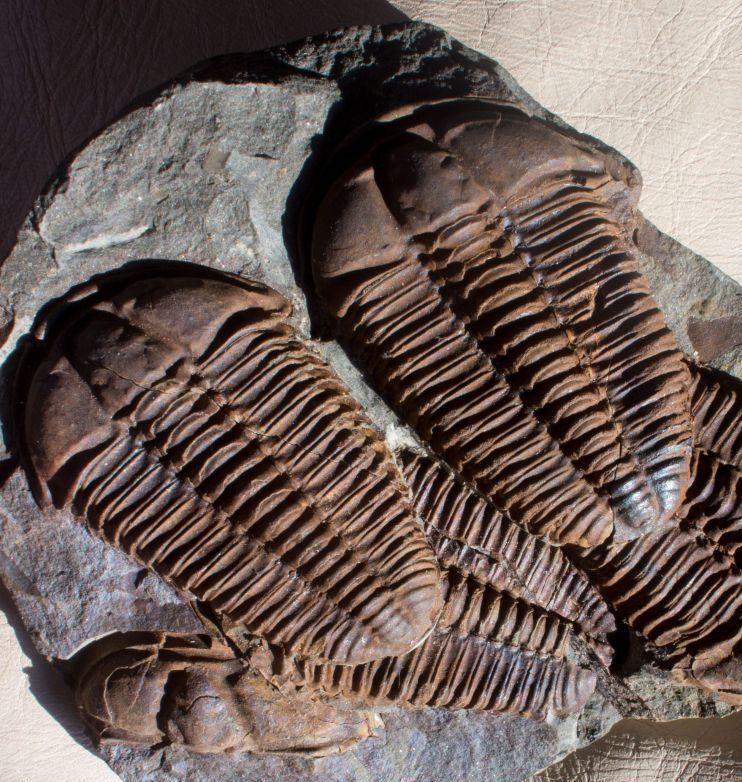
- Conocoryphe sulzeri

Scientific classification
- Kingdom: Animalia
- Phylum: Arthropoda
- Clade: †Artiopoda
- Class: †Trilobita
- Order: †Ptychopariida
- Suborder: †Ptychopariina; Swinnerton, 1915

Superfamilies
- Ellipsocephaloidea†; Ptychoparioidea†

= Ptychopariina =

Ptychopariina Temporal range: Lower Cambrian–Middle Ordovician

Suborder of trilobites (fossil)

Ptychopariina is an extinct suborder of trilobites of the order Ptychopariida. Also known as the primitive Ptychopariida, they are a notably wide and varied taxon. Some of the representative genera include Elrathia, Densonella, Norwoodia, Tricrepicephalus, Conocoryphe, and Modocia.

== Description ==
Specialization is common in the Ptychopariina, which has made it difficult for authors to develop a single type that can distinguish Ptychopariina from other clades. The thorax tends to be relatively long, with the pygidium generally smaller in size than the thorax.
