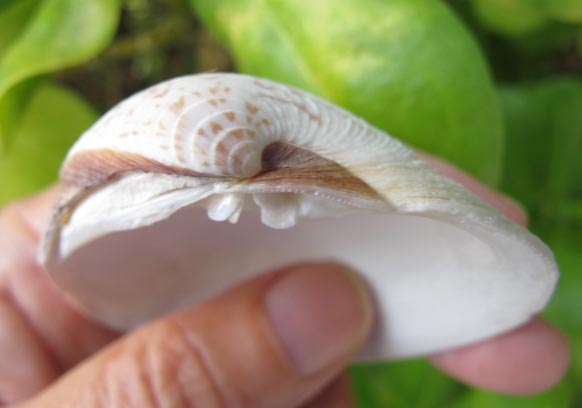

Scientific classification
- Domain: Eukaryota
- Kingdom: Animalia
- Phylum: Mollusca
- Class: Bivalvia
- Order: Venerida
- Family: Veneridae
- Genus: Mercenaria
- Species: M. campechiensis

Binomial name
- Mercenaria campechiensis (Gmelin, 1791)

Synonyms
- Venus campechiensis Gmelin, 1791

= Mercenaria campechiensis =

Species of bivalve

Mercenaria campechiensis, also known as the southern hardshell clam, southern hard clam, and southern quahog, is a species of bivalve belonging to the family Veneridae. The species is found in western North Atlantic north to New Jersey (USA), including the Caribbean and the Gulf of Mexico in waters shallower than 20 meters.

Mercenaria campechiensis is harvested commercially for human consumption. It can hybridize with Mercenaria mercenaria where their local distributions overlap. However, it typically occurs in nearshore open-ocean waters, whereas Mercenaria mercenaria is found in embayments and estuaries.

== Description ==
Mercenaria campechiensis can grow to a total length of 15–18 cm (5.9–7.1 in). It can reach at least 28 years in age. The shell is roundish. The presence of anterior concentric ridges can be used to differentiate Mercenaria campechiensis from Mercenaria mercenaria (ridges absent).

Right and left valve of the same specimen:

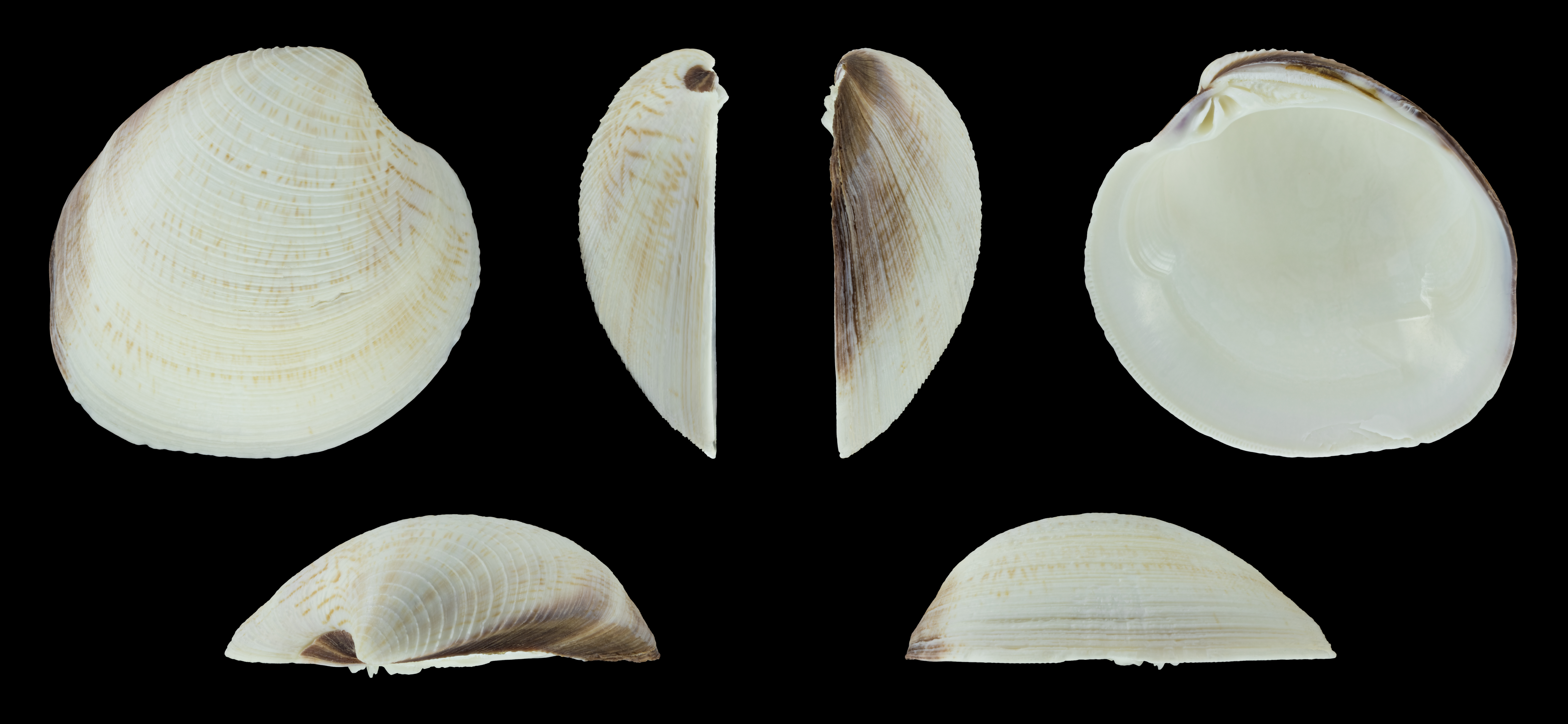
Right valve

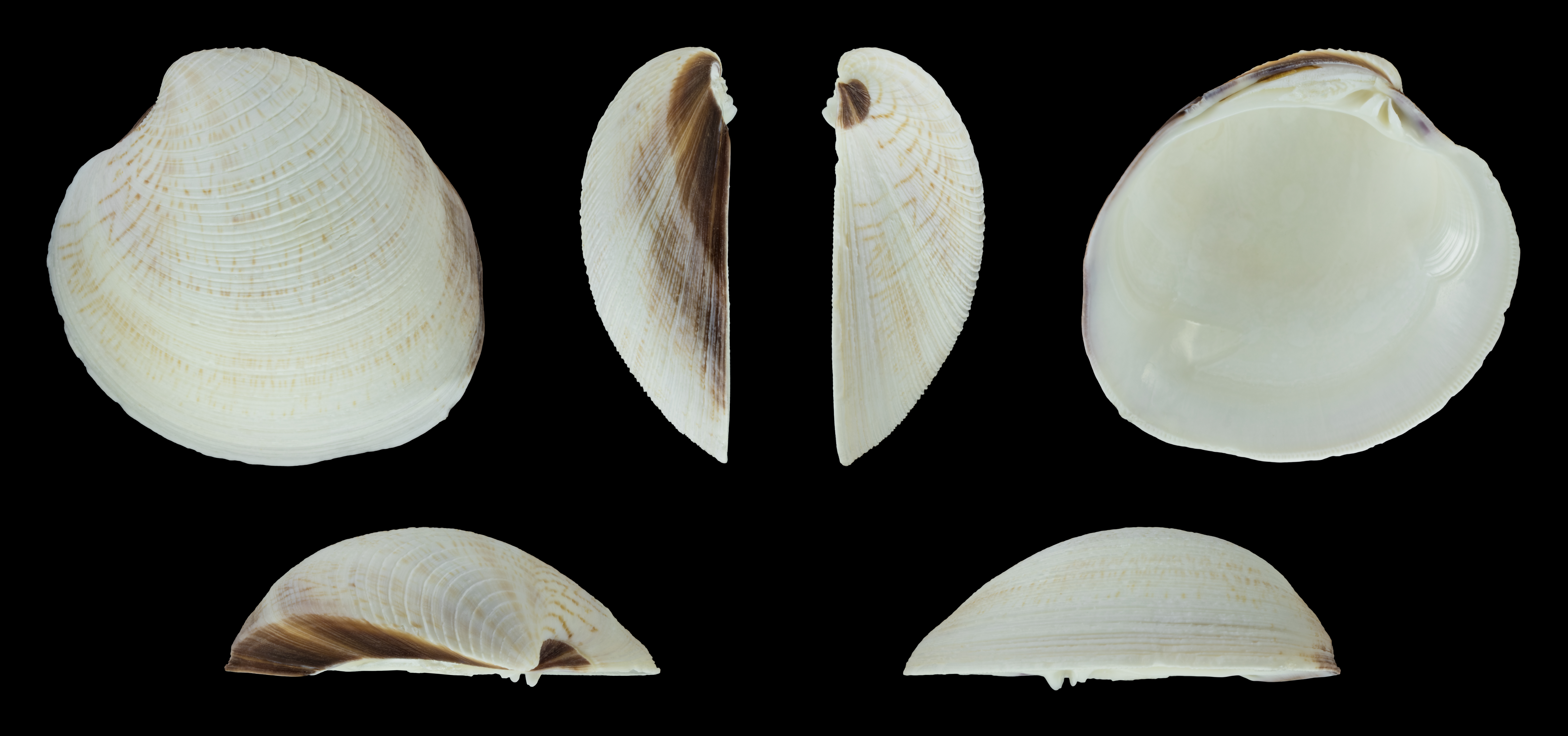
Left valve
