= Paleonelsonia =

Scientific classification
- Domain: Eukaryota
- Kingdom: Animalia
- Phylum: Arthropoda
- Class: †Trilobita
- Order: †Ptychopariida
- Family: †Ptychopariidae
- Genus: †Paleonelsonia; Özdikmen, 2008

Extinct genus of trilobites

Paleonelsonia is a fossil genus of trilobites belonging to the family Ptychopariidae.
