= Ontoella =

Scientific classification
- Kingdom: Animalia
- Phylum: Arthropoda
- Clade: †Artiopoda
- Class: †Trilobita
- Order: †Ptychopariida
- Family: †Ptychopariidae
- Genus: †Ontoella; Chernysheva, 1961
- Species: †O. triangulata

Binomial name
- †Ontoella triangulata Chernysheva, 1961

Extinct genus of trilobites

Ontoella is an extinct genus of trilobite in the class Trilobita. There is at least one described species in Ontoella, O. triangulata.
