= Ferdinand Vandeveer Hayden =

American geologist and surgeon (1829–1887)

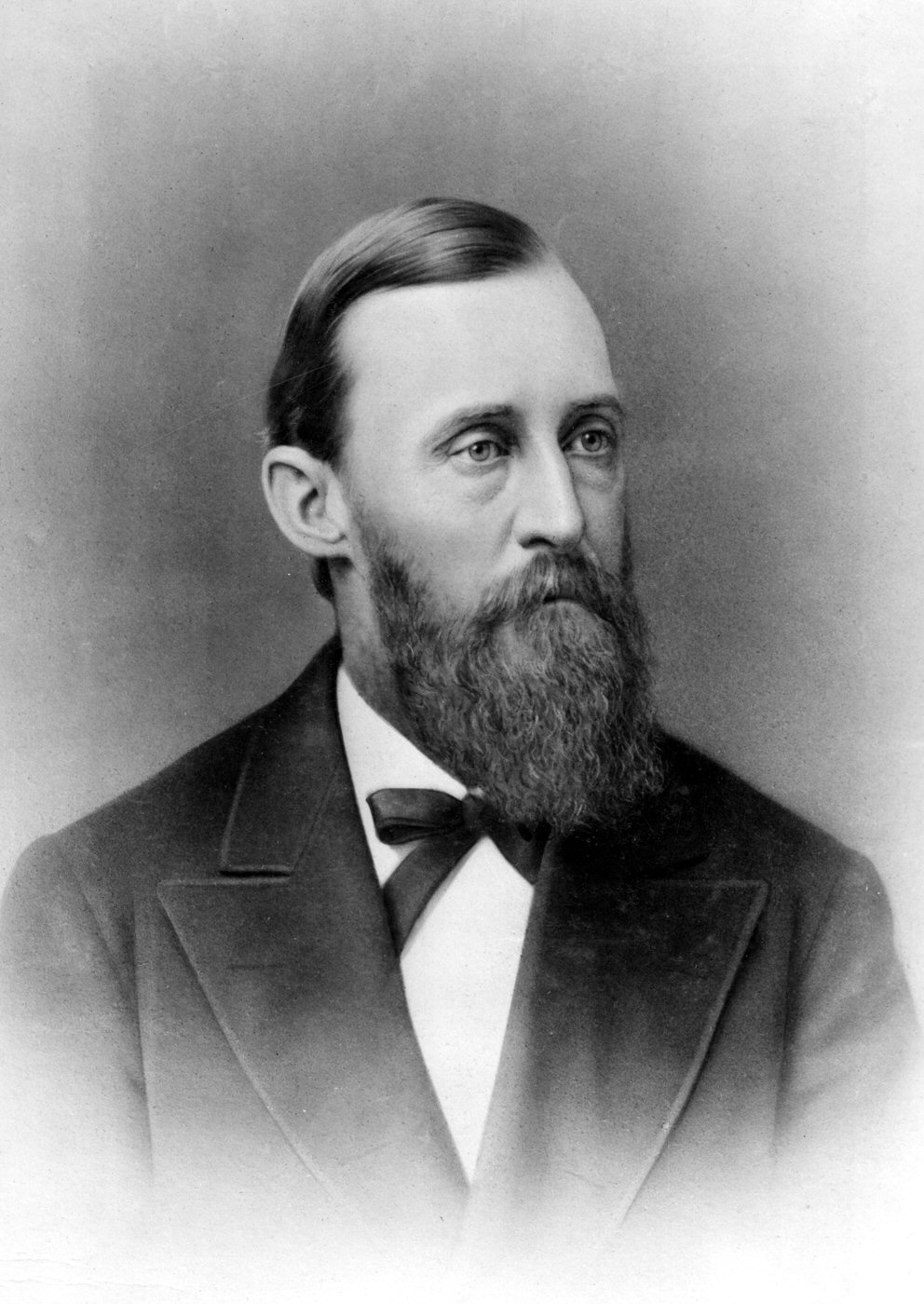
- Hayden in 1870
- Born: September 7, 1829; Westfield, Massachusetts, U.S.
- Died: December 22, 1887 (aged 58)
- Other name: "Man Who Picks Up Stones Running"
- Known for: Survey expeditions of the Rocky Mountains
- Scientific career
- Fields: Geology

Ferdinand Vandeveer Hayden (September 7, 1829 – December 22, 1887) was an American geologist noted for his pioneering surveying expeditions of the Rocky Mountains in the late 19th century. He was also a physician who served with the Union Army during the Civil War.

== Early life ==
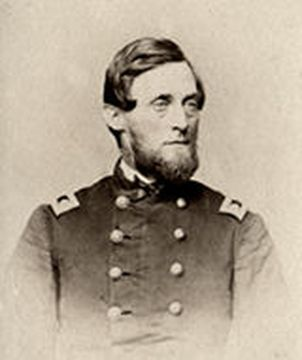
Hayden during the Civil War

Ferdinand Hayden was born in Westfield, Massachusetts. As a young boy he was fascinated with all nature and wildlife, which led him into the field of medicine. He worked in Cleveland under Jared Potter Kirtland and thereafter in Albany, NY, where he worked under James Hall, of the Geological Survey of New York.

He graduated from Oberlin College in 1850 and from the Albany Medical College in 1853, where he attracted the notice of Professor James Hall, state geologist of New York, through whose influence he was induced to join in an exploration of Nebraska Territory, with Fielding B. Meek to study geology and collect fossils.

Hall sent him on his first geological venture in the summer of 1853. Being of independent mind Hayden ended his commission with Hall, and with the encouragement of S. F. Baird, and a partial sponsorship from the Smithsonian Institution, he spent the remainder of the 1850s on various exploring and collecting expeditions in the northern Missouri River areas.

In 1856 and 1857, Hayden accompanied exploration expeditions led by Lieutenant Gouverneur K. Warren and in 1859, the Raynolds Expedition of 1860 led by Captain William F. Raynolds, both of the Topographical Engineers. One result of the expedition was his Geological Report of the Exploration of the Yellowstone and Missouri Rivers in 1859–1860 (1869).

During the Civil War he served as an army surgeon. He rose to be chief medical officer of the Army of the Shenandoah and received a brevet to lieutenant colonel.

== Geological surveys ==
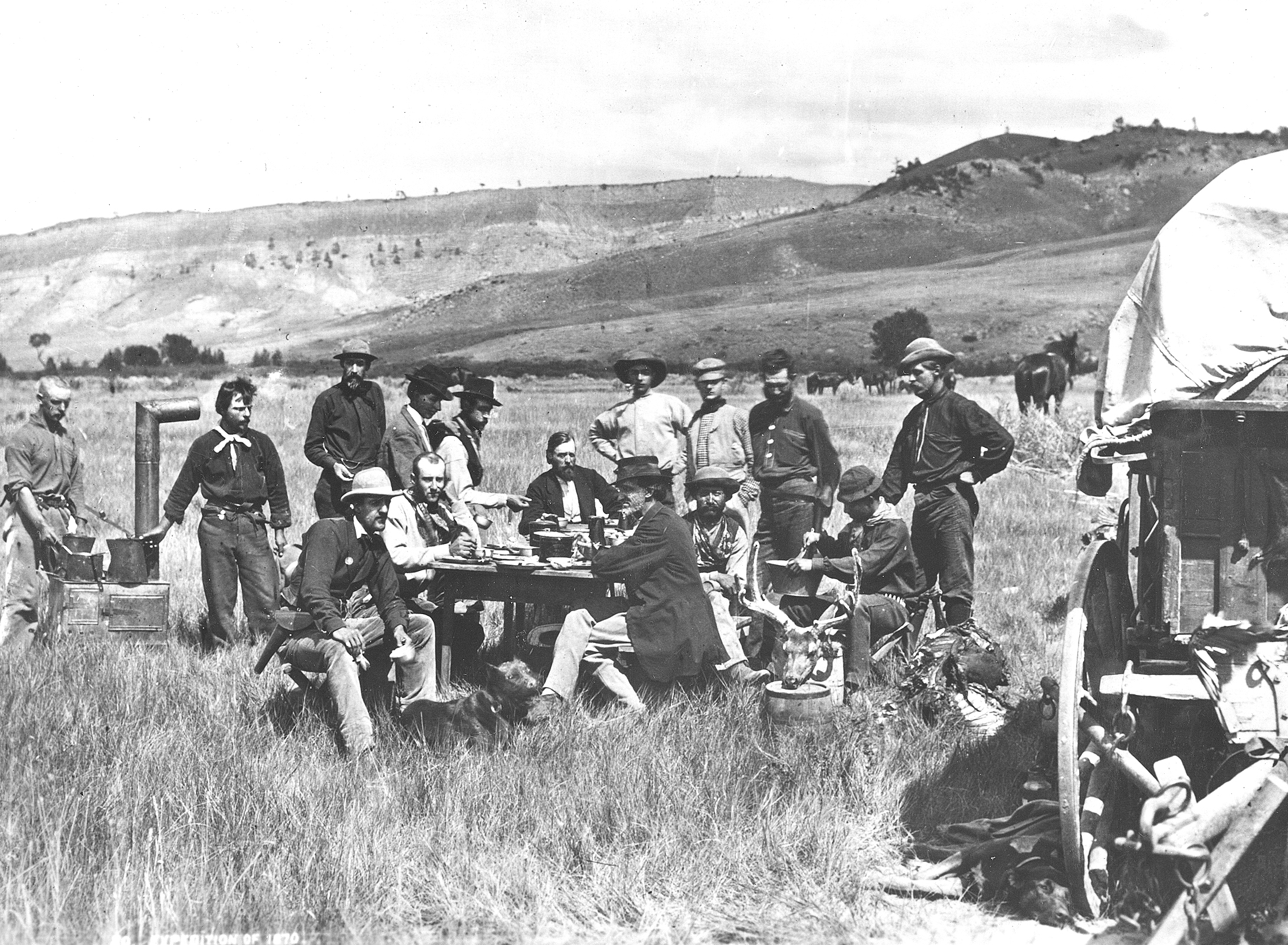
A noon meal in Ferdinand V. Hayden's camp of the U.S. Geological and Geophysical Survey. Red Buttes, Wyoming Territory, August 24, 1870. Hayden sits at far end of table in dark jacket. (Photo by William Henry Jackson, standing at far right)

After the American Civil War Hayden led geographic and geologic surveys of the Nebraska and Western Territories for the United States Government. In 1867 he was appointed geologist-in-charge of the United States Geological and Geographical Survey of the Territories.

In 1869, Hayden led an expedition along the Front Range to Denver and Santa Fe. In 1870 he received a $25,000 governmental grant to lead a 20-man expedition to South Pass, Fort Bridger, Henry's Fork, and back to Cheyenne.

About this time, he also became identified with the Megatherium Club at the Smithsonian Institution in Washington, D.C. To measure distances during their journeys into the western frontier Hayden employed the use of an odometer, a device used by mappers to estimate distances traveled. The device was mounted on a mule-drawn cart that measured distances as the cart wheels rolled along. Because of rough terrain the device was accurate to within about 3%.

=== Yellowstone ===
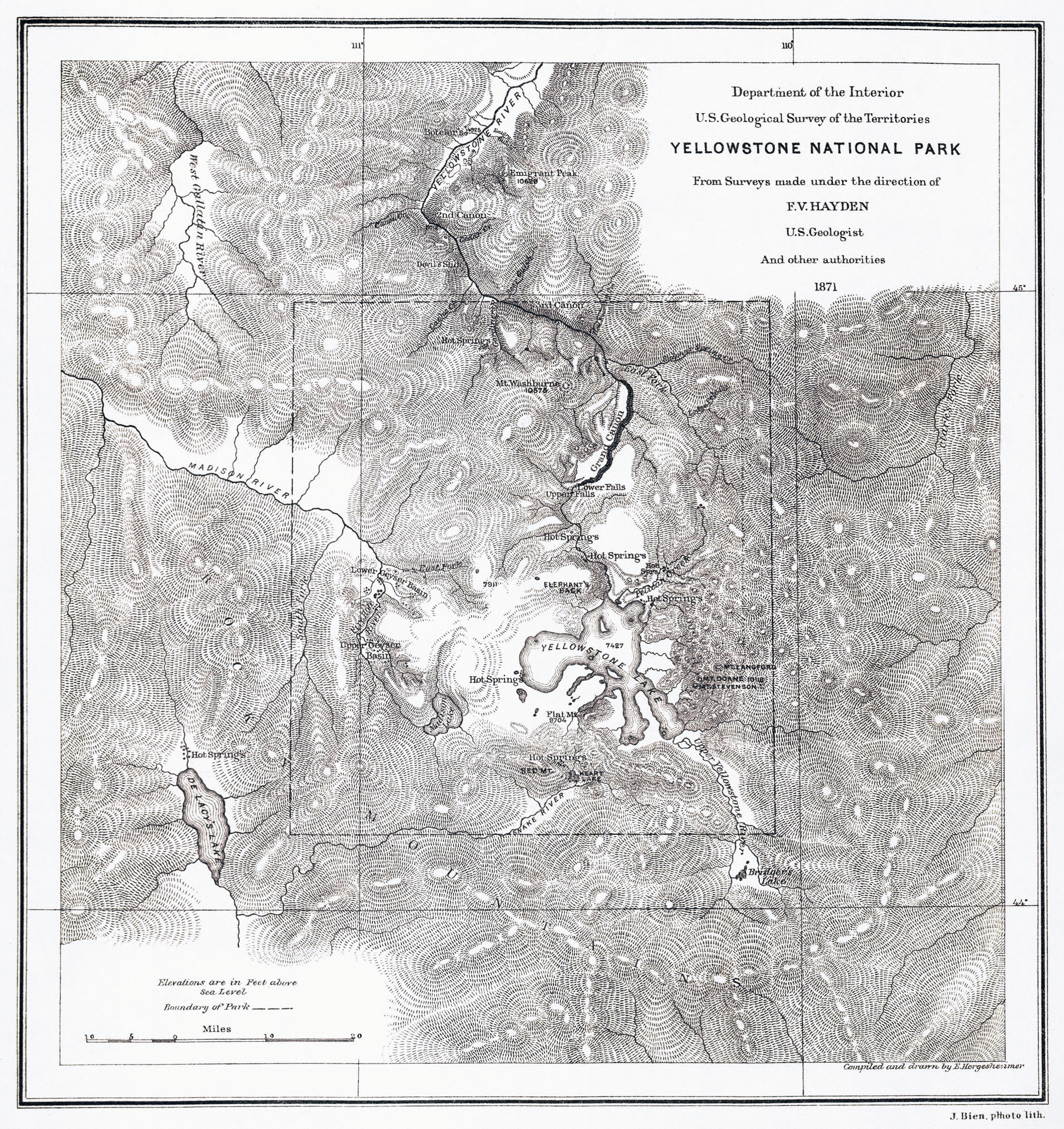
F.V. Hayden's map of Yellowstone National Park, 1871

In 1871, Hayden led America's first federally funded geological survey into the Yellowstone region of northwestern Wyoming, given directions by President Ulysses S. Grant's Secretary of Interior Columbus Delano. The survey consisted of some 50 men which included notables such as painter Thomas Moran and famous frontier/Civil War photographer William Henry Jackson. The following year, Hayden and his work, Preliminary Report of the United States Geological Survey of Montana and Portions of Adjacent Territories; Being a Fifth Annual Report of Progress was instrumental in convincing Congress to establish Yellowstone as the first U.S. National Park, aided by Jackson's stunning large-format photographs and Moran's dramatic paintings. These publications also encouraged the westward expansion of the United States.

== Later life ==
Hayden was elected to the American Philosophical Society in 1860. He was made professor of geology at the University of Pennsylvania in 1865 with the help of Leidy. Hayden was elected a member of the American Antiquarian Society in 1873. He was elected a Foreign Member of the Geological Society of London in 1879. Upon the reorganization and establishment of the United States Geological Survey in 1879 he acted for seven years as one of the geologists. He died in Philadelphia on December 22, 1887, and is interred at The Woodlands Cemetery.

== Legacy ==
From his twelve years of labor and annual survey journeys there resulted a most valuable series of volumes in all branches of natural history and economic science; and he issued in 1877 his Geological and Geographical Atlas of Colorado. The last of the annual survey journeys was in 1878. As a result of Hayden's extensive geological work, he uncovered numerous dinosaur fossils which he brought back east with him for further scientific study. Much of what he brought back is still housed in the collection of the Smithsonian Institution. American paleontologist Joseph Leidy obtained most of his fossil specimens from Hayden.

Hayden Valley in Yellowstone is named after him. In 2018, Native American leaders have called for it to be renamed, because he "advocated for the extermination of tribal people who refused to comply with federal dictates". The town of Hayden, Colorado, located in the Yampa River valley, is named for him. Many mountain peaks bear his name as well. The sedge Carex haydeniana was named for him by Stephen Thayer Olney, in 1871. A subspecies of garter snake, Thamnophis radix haydenii, was named for him by Robert Kennicott in 1860. A land snail, Oreohelix haydeni, was named for him by William Gabb in 1869. Hayden Hall at the University of Pennsylvania which formerly housed the dental school now houses the bioengineering and earth sciences departments. Hayden was eulogized by United States Geological Survey Director John Wesley Powell in an annual report to the United States Secretary of the Interior in 1889.

== Other publications ==
With FB Meek, he wrote (Smithsonian Institution Contributions, v. 14. Art. 4) "Palaeontology of the Upper Missouri, Pt. 1, Invertebrate." His valuable notes on Native American dialects are in The Transactions of the American Philosophical Society (1862) in The American Journal of Science (1862) and in The Proceedings of the American Philosophical Society (1869). With ARC Selwyn he wrote North America (1883) for Stanford's Compendium.

- Sun Pictures of Rocky Mountain Scenery (1870)
  - "Artworks Collection: Sun Pictures of Rocky Mountain Scenery". Amon Carter Museum of American Art.
- The Yellowstone National Park, illustrated by chromolithographic reproductions of water-colour sketches by Thomas Moran (1876)
- The Great West: its Attractions and Resources (1880)

== See also ==
- Exploration of North America
- A.D. Wilson a member of several of Hayden's surveys.
- Joseph Leidy, paleontologist
