= Theodore Gill =

American biologist

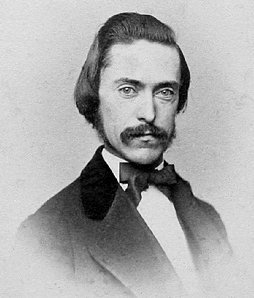
Theodore Nicholas Gill

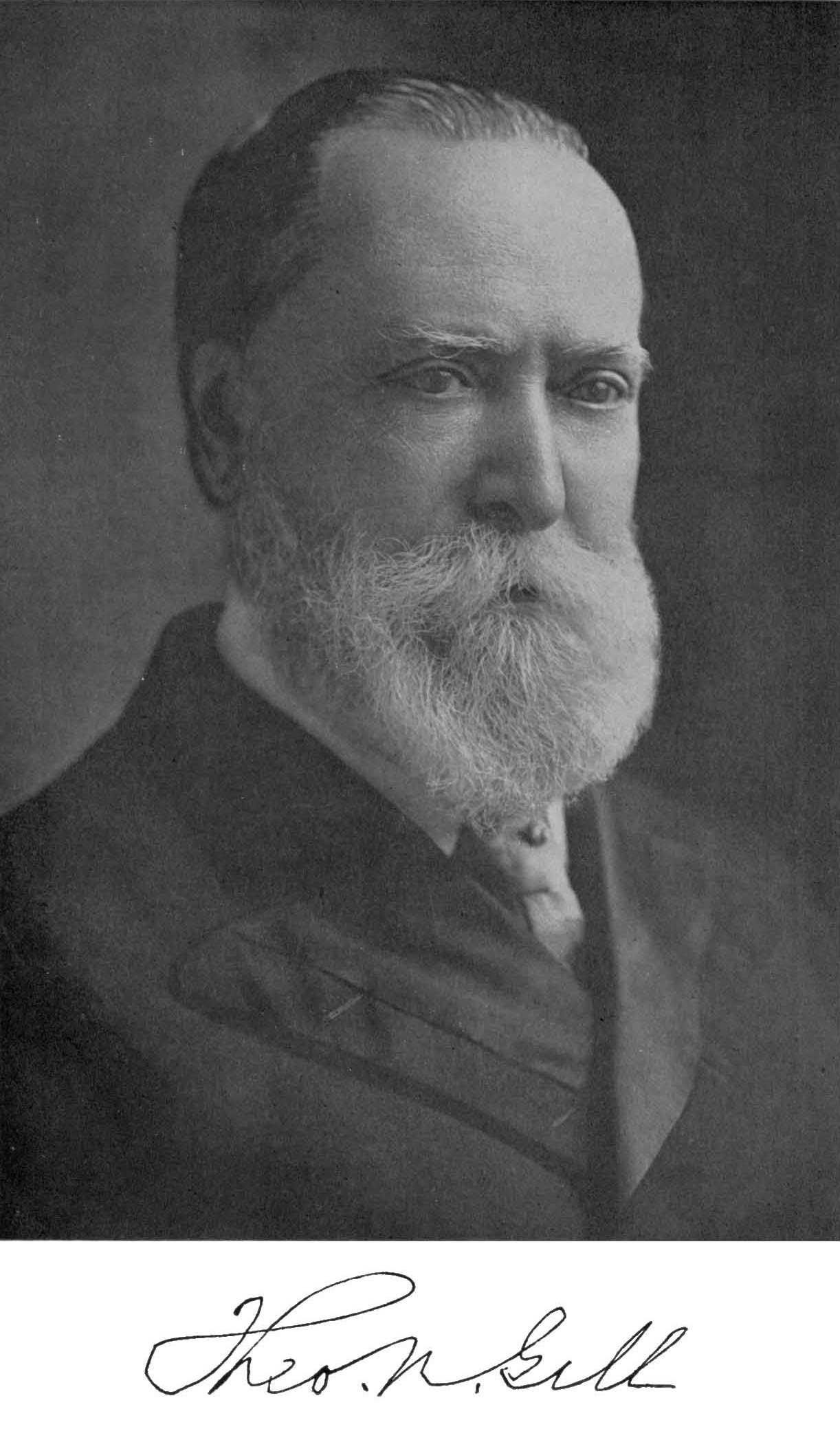
Theodore Nicholas Gill

Theodore Nicholas Gill (March 21, 1837 – September 25, 1914) was an American ichthyologist, mammalogist, malacologist, and librarian.

== Career ==
Gill was born in New York City to James Darrell and Elizabeth Vosburgh Gill. His father, the son of a Newfoundland merchant, descended from an old Devonshire family, while his mother was of old New York Dutch stock. Educated under private tutors, Gill showed an early interest in natural history. He was associated with J. Carson Brevoort in the arrangement of the latter's entomological and ichthyological collections before going to Washington, DC, in 1863 to work at the Smithsonian Institution. He catalogued mammals, fishes, and mollusks most particularly, although he maintained proficiency in other orders of animals. He was librarian at the Smithsonian and also senior assistant to the Library of Congress. He was elected as a member of the American Philosophical Society in 1867.

Gill was professor of zoology at George Washington University. He was also a member of the Megatherium Club at the Smithsonian Institution in Washington, DC. Fellow members frequently mocked him for his vanity. He was president of the American Association for the Advancement of Science in 1897.

He was a founding member of the Cosmos Club.

== Publications ==
Besides 400 separate papers on scientific subjects, his major publications include:

- 1871. Arrangements of the Families of Mollusks 49 pp.
- 1872. Arrangement of the Families of Mammals 98 pp.
- 1872. Arrangement of the Families of Fishes
- 1875. Catalogue of the Fishes of the East Coast of North America
- 1882. Bibliography of the Fishes of the Pacific of the United States to the End of 1879
- Reports on Zoology for the annual volumes of the Smithsonian Institution from 1879

== See also ==
- Category:Taxa named by Theodore Gill
