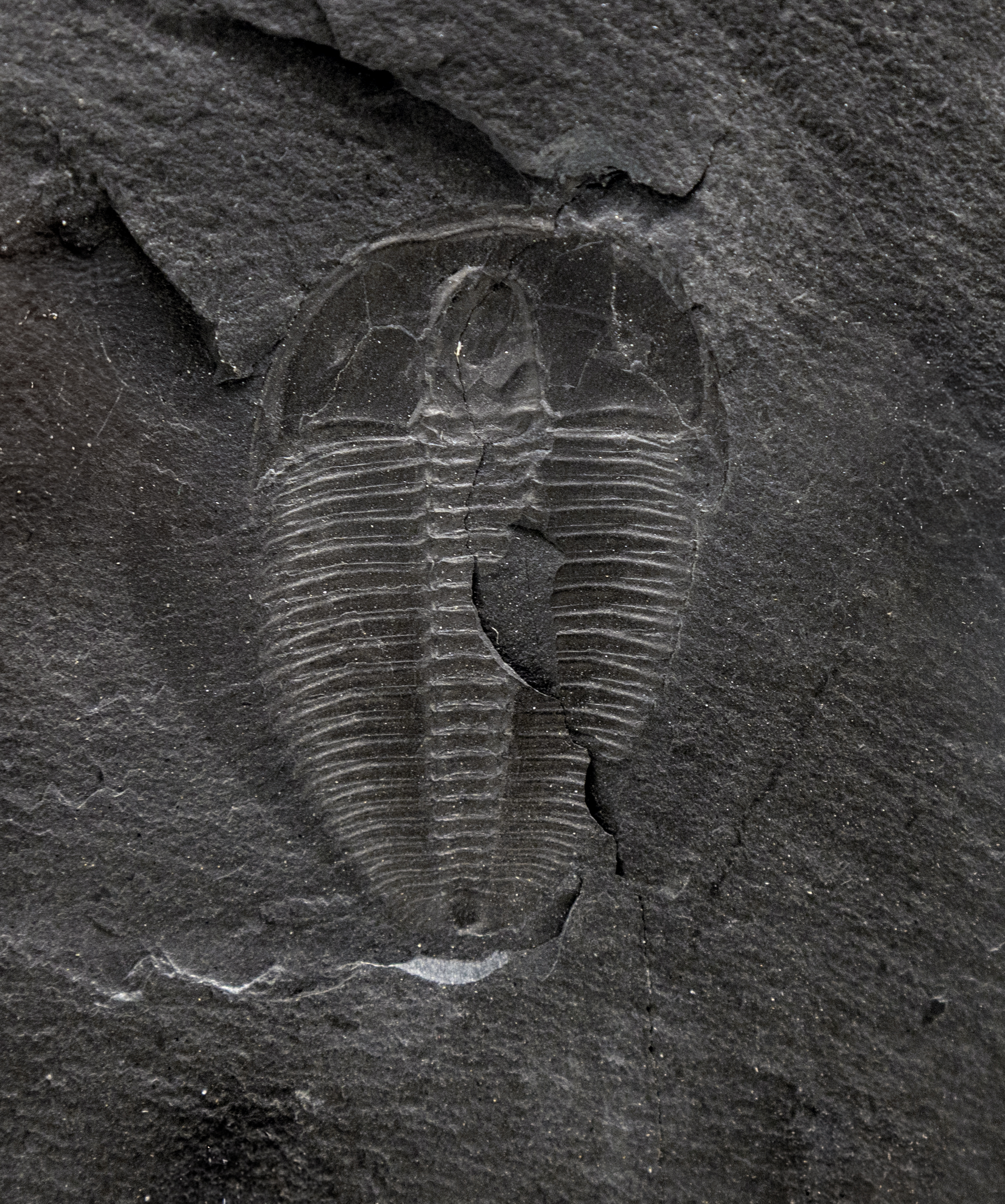
- C. palliseri, Royal Tyrrell Museum of Palaeontology

Scientific classification
- Kingdom: Animalia
- Phylum: Arthropoda
- Clade: †Artiopoda
- Class: †Trilobita
- Order: †Ptychopariida
- Family: †Alokistocaridae
- Genus: †Chancia; Walcott, 1924

Species
- Chancia rasettii (type) Walcott, 1924; Chancia ebdome (unrecognized); Chancia tuberculata (unrecognized)

= Chancia (trilobite) =

Chancia Temporal range: Cambrian

Genus of trilobites

Chancia is an extinct genus of Cambrian trilobite. It was a "fast-moving epifaunal detritivore" from Canada (British Columbia, specifically Burgess Shale, and Newfoundland) and the United States (Idaho, Pennsylvania, Utah, and Vermont). Chancia was a particle feeder. Its major characteristics are a normal glabella but an enlarged cephalon due to a pre-glabellar field in front of the glabella, as well as developed eye ridges, medium-sized genal spines, and an extremely small pygidium.
