= Champlainia =

Champlainia Temporal range: Cambrian

Scientific classification
- Kingdom: Animalia
- Phylum: Arthropoda
- Clade: †Artiopoda
- Class: †Trilobita
- Order: †Ptychopariida
- Family: †Ptychopariidae
- Genus: †Champlainia; Howell, 1937

Extinct genus of trilobites

Champlainia is an extinct genus from a well-known class of fossil marine arthropods, the trilobites. It lived during the Cambrian Period, which lasted from approximately 542 to 488 million years ago.
