= Megatherium Club =

Scientific society formed in 1857

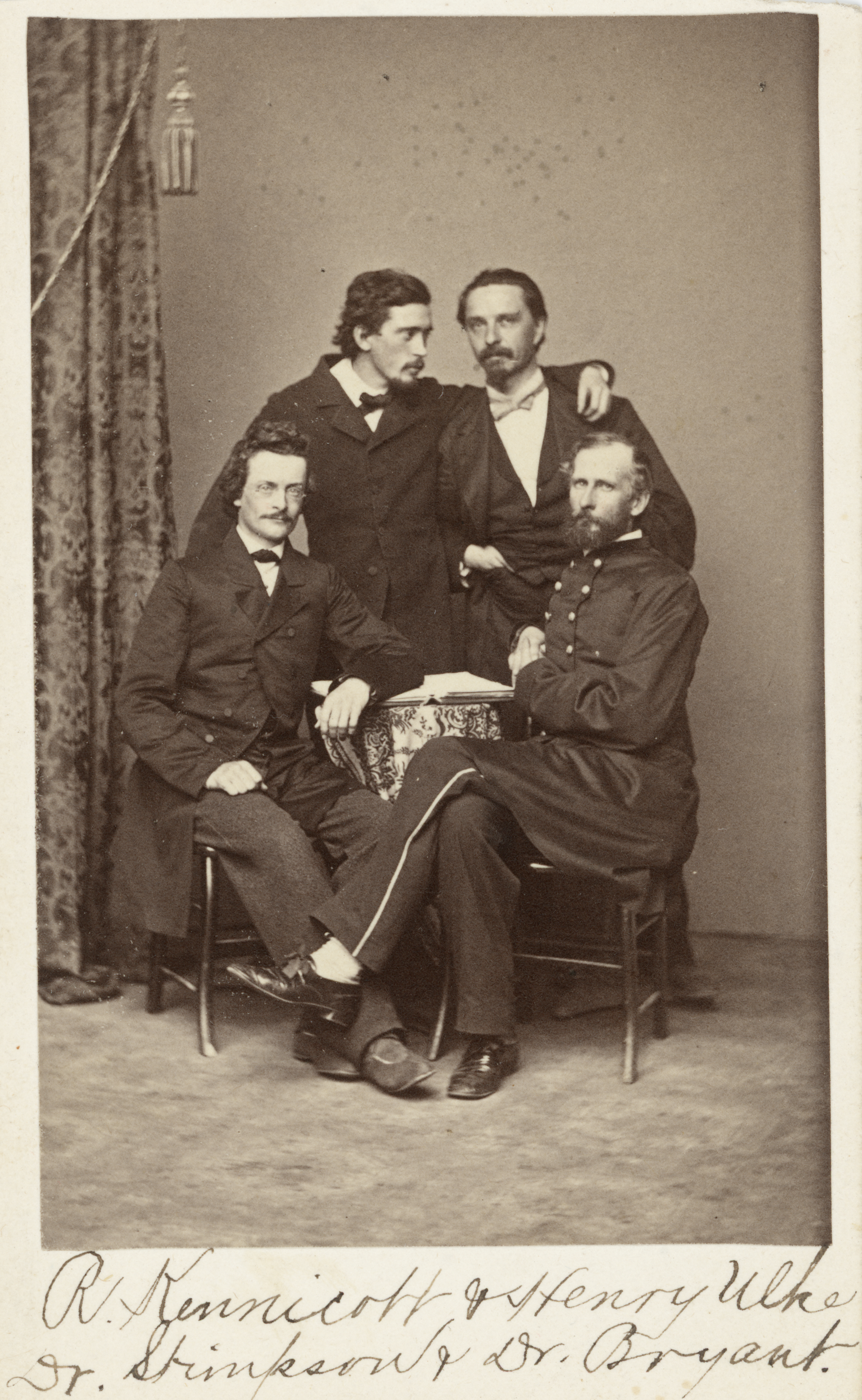
Robert Kennicott, Henry Ulke, William Stimpson, and Henry Bryant of the Megatherium Club, circa 1863.

The Megatherium Club was a group of scientists based in Washington, D.C. as a result of the Smithsonian Institution's rapidly growing collection, meeting from 1857 to 1866. It was founded by William Stimpson.

Many of the members had no formal education, but came by their expertise through extensive direct observation. They spent their weekdays in the rigorous and exacting work of describing and classifying species. But their nights were spent in revelry. They particularly enjoyed partaking in ale, oysters, eggnog, and whatever other fineries their meager budgets could afford. On Sundays, however, they recuperated from the week's stresses and excesses with long nature hikes.

The club was named for the Megatherium, an extinct genus of giant ground sloth.

The leading spirit of the club was marine biologist William Stimpson, who hosted its earliest meetings in his home. Members dubbed the place "The Stimpsonian." By 1863, though, Stimpson and others had taken up residence in the castle of the actual Smithsonian.

Club members were encouraged by Spencer Fullerton Baird, the institution's assistant secretary. And they attracted a variety of learned speakers to their meetings, including Louis Agassiz, John Torrey, and John Cassin. But they were eventually thrown out of their castle suites by the institution's secretary, Joseph Henry, who disapproved of the way members held sack races in the Great Hall and periodically serenaded his daughters.

Membership was transitory as individuals undertook independent studies abroad, sometimes for years at a time. Formal meetings ceased about the year 1866 when Stimpson moved to Chicago to oversee that city's Academy of Sciences.

Several other "Megatherium Clubs" exist; one formed of overseas Smithsonian researchers, yet another only in fiction, supposedly located in London, United Kingdom.

== Members ==
- Henry Bryant
- James E. Cooper, owner and manager of the Adam Forepaugh Circus, donated the elephant named Dunk to the National Zoo in 1891.
- Edward Drinker Cope
- Lawrence Humphrey Evers
- Theodore Gill
- Ferdinand Hayden
- Robert Kennicott
- Fielding Bradford Meek
- John Strong Newberry
- William Stimpson
- Henry Ulke
