= Fielding Bradford Meek =

American scientist

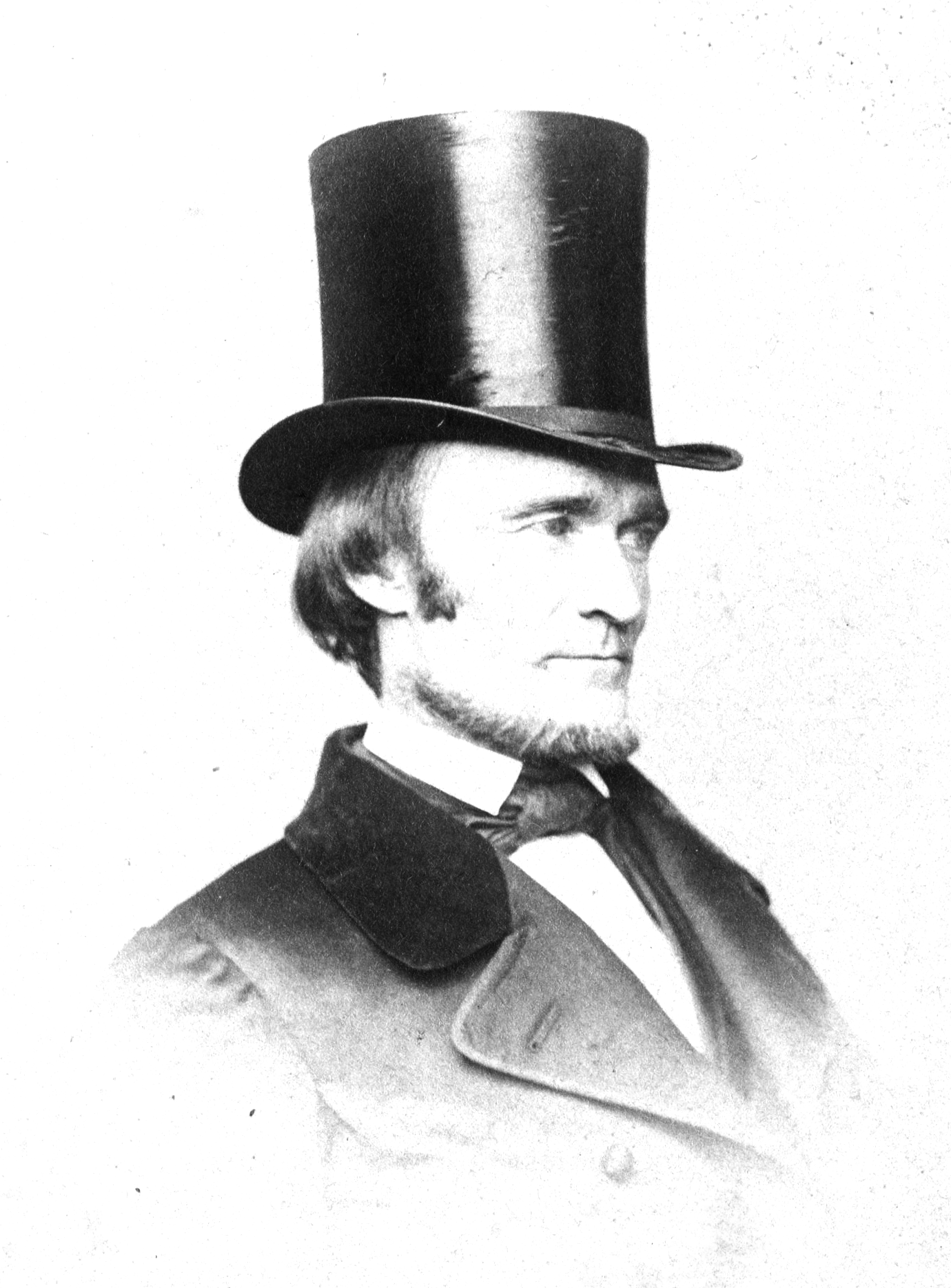
Fielding Bradford Meek

Fielding Bradford Meek (December 10, 1817 – December 22, 1876) was an American geologist and a paleontologist who specialized in the invertebrates.

== Biography ==
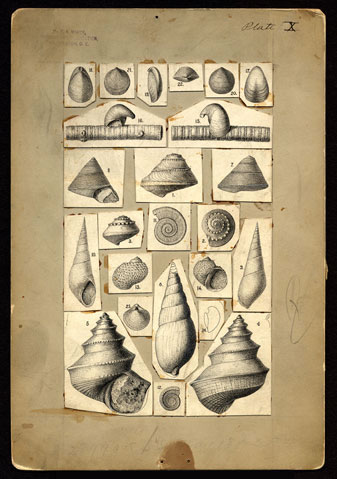
Drawings of mollusks by Fielding Bradford Meek

The son of a lawyer, he was born in Madison, Indiana. In early life he was in business as a merchant, but he became deaf and spent his leisure hours devoted to collecting fossils and studying the rocks of the neighborhood of Madison. Being unsuccessful in business with delicate health he turned his whole attention to science, and in 1848 he gained employment on the United States Geological and Geographical Survey of the Territories as an assistant to D. D. Owen in Iowa, and subsequently in Wisconsin and Minnesota. In 1852 he became assistant to Professor James Hall at Albany, New York, and worked at palaeontology with him until 1858. He received training in illustration from Frederick Swinton. Meanwhile, in 1853 he accompanied FV Hayden in an exploration of the badlands of Dakota and brought back valuable collections of fossils.

In 1858 following clashes with Hall he went to Washington, D.C., where he devoted his time to the palaeontological work of the United States geological and geographical surveys, his work bearing the stamp of the most faithful and conscientious research, and raising him to the highest rank as a palaeontologist. About this time, both he and Hayden joined the Megatherium Club at the Smithsonian Institution.

In 1867, he was elected as a member of the American Philosophical Society.

Besides many separate contributions to science, he prepared with WM Gabb (1839–1878) two volumes on the palaeontology of California (1864–1869) and a Report on the Invertebrate Cretaceous and Tertiary Fossils of the Upper Missouri Country (1876). He died of tuberculosis at Washington in 1876 and is interred at Congressional Cemetery.
