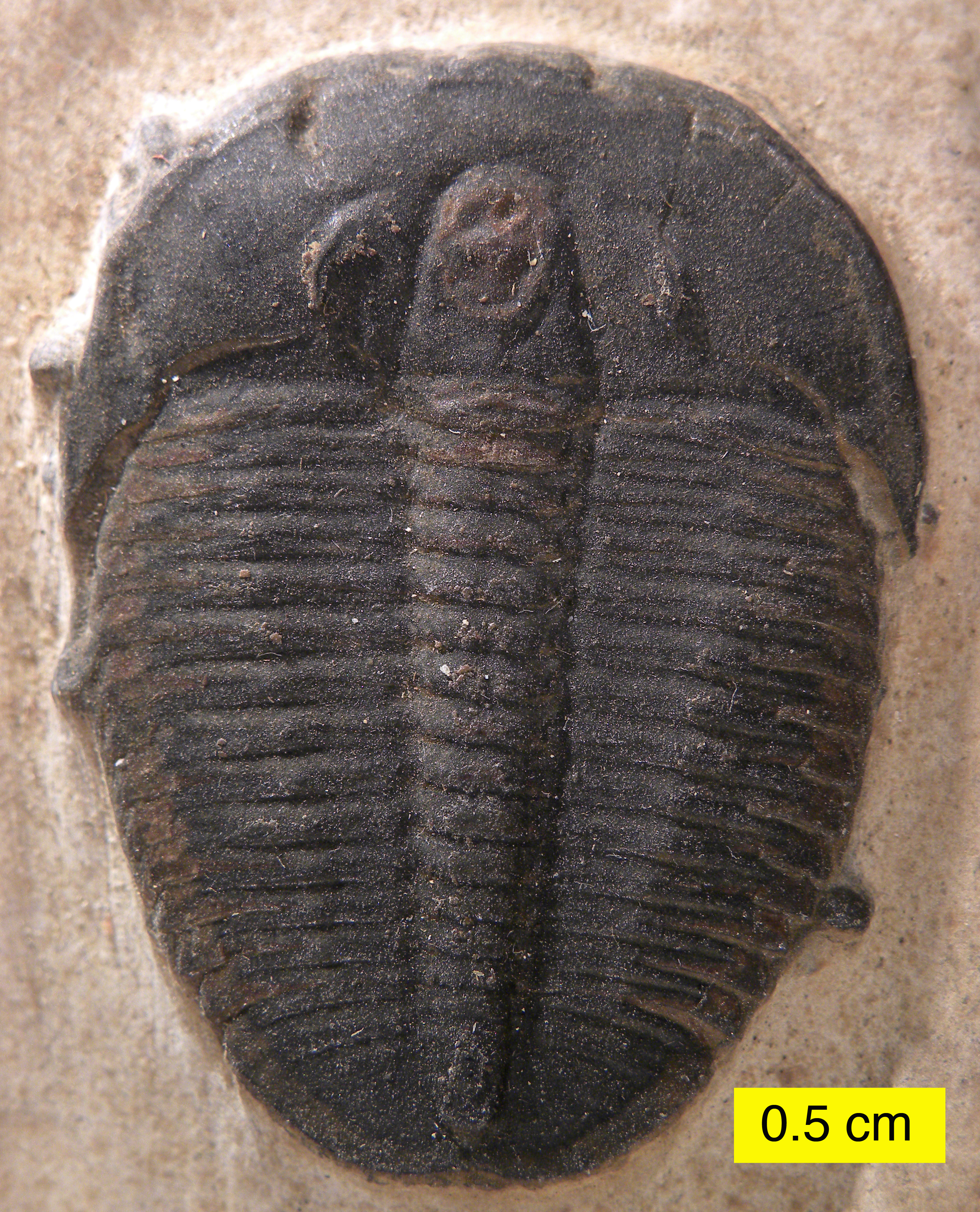
- Elrathia kingii

Scientific classification
- Kingdom: Animalia
- Phylum: Arthropoda
- Clade: †Artiopoda
- Class: †Trilobita
- Order: †Ptychopariida
- Family: †Alokistocaridae
- Genus: †Elrathia; Walcott, 1924

Type species
- Conocoryphe kingii Meek, 1870

Species
- Elrathia kingii (Meek, 1870) = Conocoryphe kingii; Elrathia antiquata (Salter, 1859) = Conocephalus antiquatus, Conocephalites antiquatus, Ehmaniella antiquata, Elrathia alabamensis, E. georgensis, Anomocarella smithi, Ehmaniella smithi; Elrathia marjumi (Robison, 1964); Elrathia permulta (Walcott, 1918) = Ptychoparia permulta

= Elrathia =

Elrathia Temporal range: Middle Cambrian, 513.0–498.5 Ma

Genus of trilobites

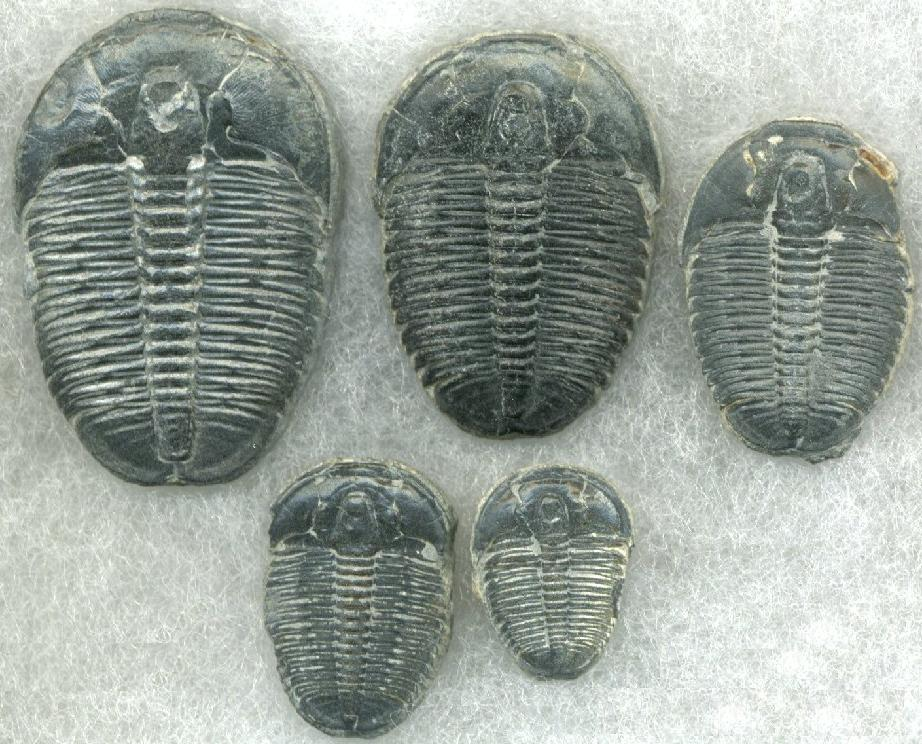
Elrathia kingii growth series with holaspids ranging from 16.2 mm to 39.8 mm in length

Elrathia is a genus of trilobite belonging to Ptychoparioidea known from the mid-Cambrian of Laurentia (North America). E. kingii is one of the most common trilobite fossils in the USA locally found in extremely high concentrations within the Wheeler Formation in the U.S. state of Utah. E. kingii has been considered the most recognizable trilobite. Commercial quarries extract E. kingii in prolific numbers, with just one commercial collector estimating 1.5 million specimens extracted in a 20-year career. 1950 specimens of Elrathia are known from the Greater Phyllopod bed, where they comprise 3.7% of the community.

"...trilobite occupied the exaerobic zone, at the boundary of anoxic and dysoxic bottom waters. E. kingii consistently occur in settings below the oxygen levels required by other contemporaneous epifaunal and infaunal benthic biota and may have derived energy from a food web that existed independently of phototrophic primary productivity. Although other fossil organisms are known to have preferred such environments, E. kingii is the earliest-known inhabitant of them, extending the documented range of the exaerobic ecological strategy into the Cambrian Period."

— Gaines & Droser, 2003, p941

== Etymology ==
Even though the generic name Elrathia was first published in the combination E. kingii, a species from the House Range, Utah, the name, itself, is derived from Elrath, Cherokee County, Alabama.

== Description ==
E. kingii is a medium-sized trilobite with a smooth sub-ovate carapace that is tapered towards the rear. Thorax is usually 13 segments. Pygidium has four axial rings and a long terminal piece. Posterior margin of the pygidium has a long broad medial notch.

In contrast, E. marjumi usually has 12 segments, 5 axial rings, lacks a notched posterior margin and possess incipient antero-lateral spines.

The British Columbian species, E. permulta, is much smaller, averaging about only 20 millimeters, and has up to thoracic 14 segments. Because E. permulta lacks several diagnostic features of the genus it may even represent a distinct genus.

== See also ==
- Hypoxia (environmental)
- Paleobiota of the Burgess Shale
