= United States Geological and Geographical Survey of the Territories =

1867–1883 surveys of the Western US

The United States Geological and Geographical Survey of the Territories was established by an act of Congress on 2 March 1867 as an agency under the Department of the Interior (later the United States General Land Office) tasked to complete a geographical survey of the State of Nebraska which had been admitted to the Union the day before. The scope of the survey eventually grew to include all the American territories adjacent to the Rocky Mountains encompassing hundreds of thousands of square miles. The survey over its existence was headed by Dr. Ferdinand Vandeveer Hayden who published a number of reports between 1867 and 1883 on the region’s geography, geology, topography, ethnology, philology, paleontology and other allied subjects. Congress originally appropriated $5,000 in 1867 for the survey of Nebraska and a similar amount the following year to survey the Wyoming Territory. As the survey’s workload increased over its existence, so did its budget and by the end of its tenure in early 1880s, Congress had appropriated approximately $750,000 for the surveys of the West, a figure that did not include some clerical and printing expenditures.
