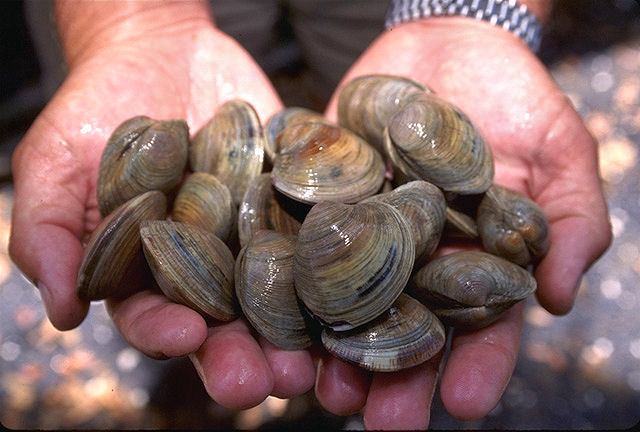
- Hard clams Mercenaria mercenaria

Scientific classification
- Kingdom: Animalia
- Phylum: Mollusca
- Class: Bivalvia
- Order: Venerida
- Superfamily: Veneroidea
- Family: Veneridae
- Genus: Mercenaria; Schumacher, 1817

Species
- 6 extant species (see text)

= Mercenaria =

Mercenaria Temporal range: Upper Oligocene–present, 28.1–0 Ma

Genus of bivalves

Mercenaria is a genus of edible marine bivalves in the family Veneridae, the Venus clams. The genus includes the quahogs, consisting of Mercenaria mercenaria, the northern quahog or hard clam, and M. campechiensis, the southern quahog, both important species for human consumption.

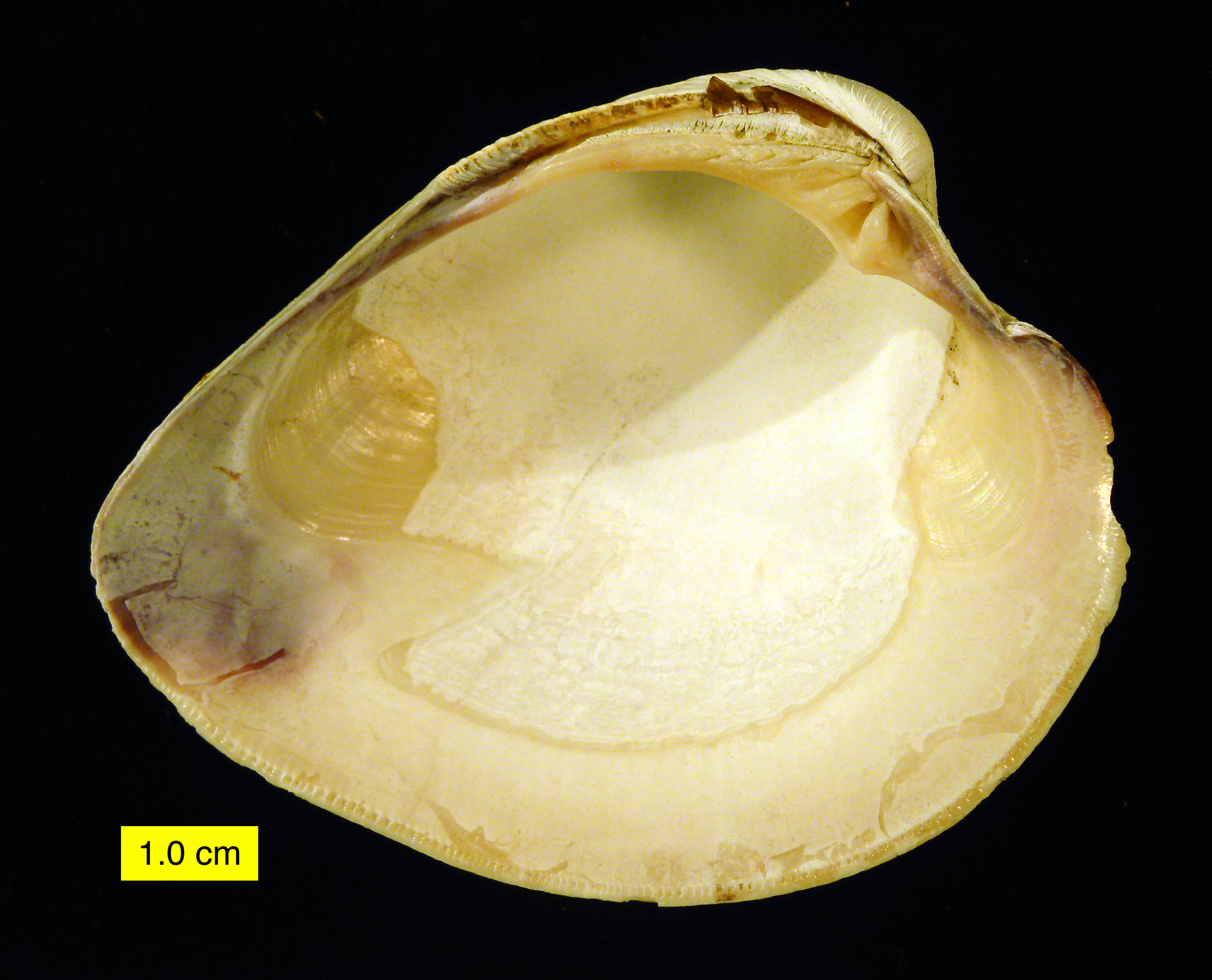
Left valve interior of Mercenaria mercenaria

== Species ==
The World Register of Marine Species accepts the following extant species as valid:

- Mercenaria browni Petuch & Berschauer, 2019
- Mercenaria campechiensis (Gmelin, 1791) – Southern quahog
- Mercenaria hartae Petuch, 2013
- Mercenaria mercenaria (Linnaeus, 1758) – Northern quahog
- Mercenaria stimpsoni (Gould, 1861) – Stimpson's hard clam
- Mercenaria texana (Dall, 1902)

Mercenaria mercenaria and M. campechiensis can hybridise where their ranges overlap.

== Fossils species ==
Several other species are known only from fossils. These mollusk are known since the Upper Oligocene (28.1–23.03 Ma). Fossil shells have been found in the sediments of Russia, Japan, Indonesia, Haiti, United States, and Brazil. At least the following species or subspecies are known from fossils:

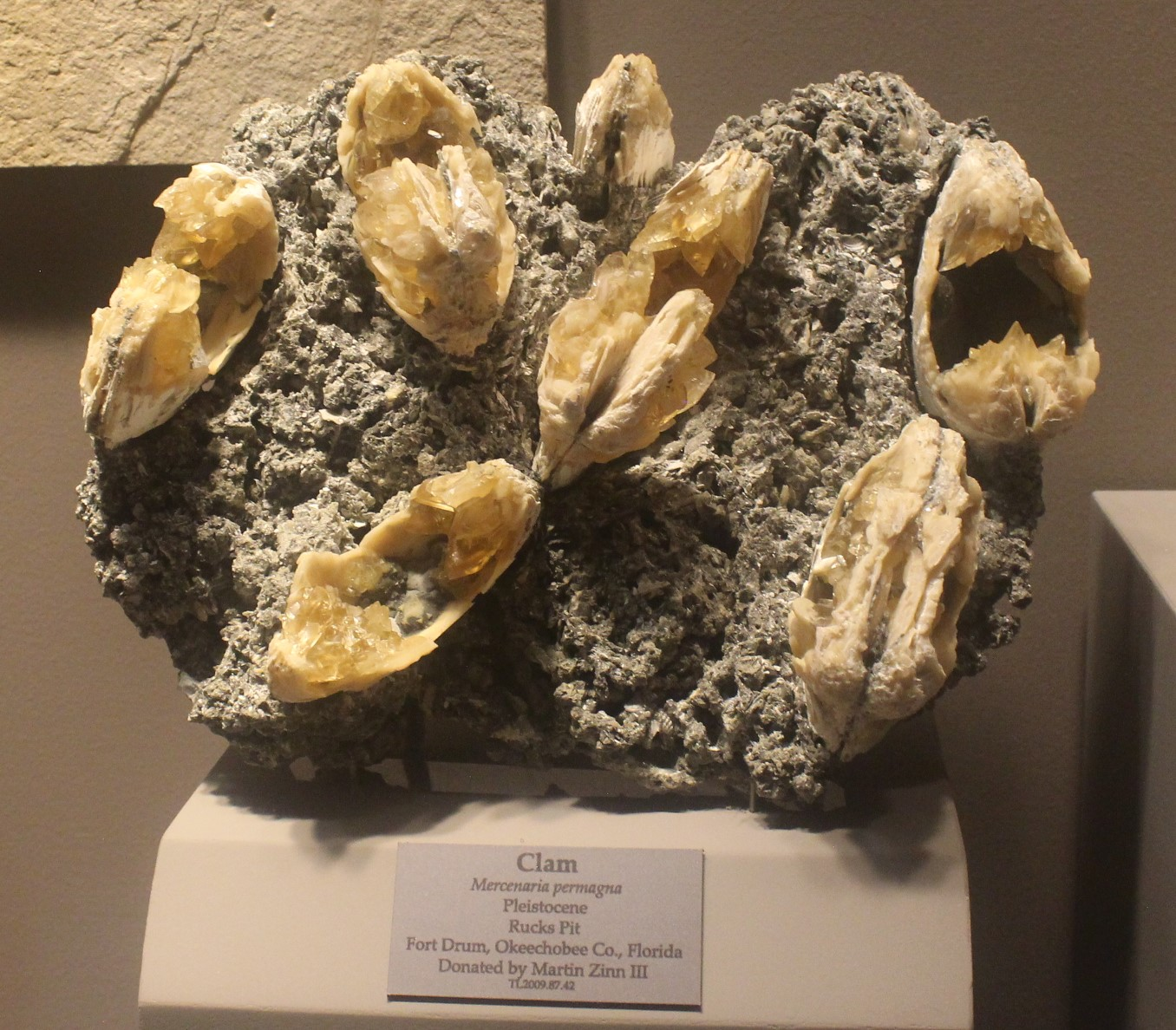
Fossil shell of Mercenaria permagna, Pleistocene of United States

- †Mercenaria blakei Ward 1992
- Mercenaria campechiensis Gmelin, 1791
  - †Mercenaria campechiensis carolinensis Conrad 1875
  - †Mercenaria campechiensis rileyi Conrad 1838
  - †Mercenaria campechiensis tridacnoides Lamarck 1818
- †Mercenaria capax Conrad 1843
- †Mercenaria cuneata Conrad 1869
- †Mercenaria druidi Ward 1992
- †Mercenaria ducatelli Conrad 1838
- †Mercenaria erecta Kellum 1926
- †Mercenaria gardnerae Kellum 1926
- †Mercenaria langdoni Dall 1900
- Mercenaria mercenaria (Linnaeus, 1758)
  - †Mercenaria mercenaria notata Say 1822
- †Mercenaria nannodes Gardner 1947
- †Mercenaria permagna Conrad 1838
- †Mercenaria plena Conrad 1869
  - †Mercenaria plena inflata Dall 1903
  - †Mercenaria plena nucea Dall 1903
- †Mercenaria problematica (K. Martin, 1883)
- †Mercenaria prodroma Gardner 1947
- †Mercenaria tetrica Conrad 1838
- †Mercenaria yokoyamai (Makiyama, 1927)
- †Mercenaria violacea Schumacher 1817

The World Register of Marine Species lists Mercenaria cuneata and M. violacea as synonyms of extant species.

== Pearls ==
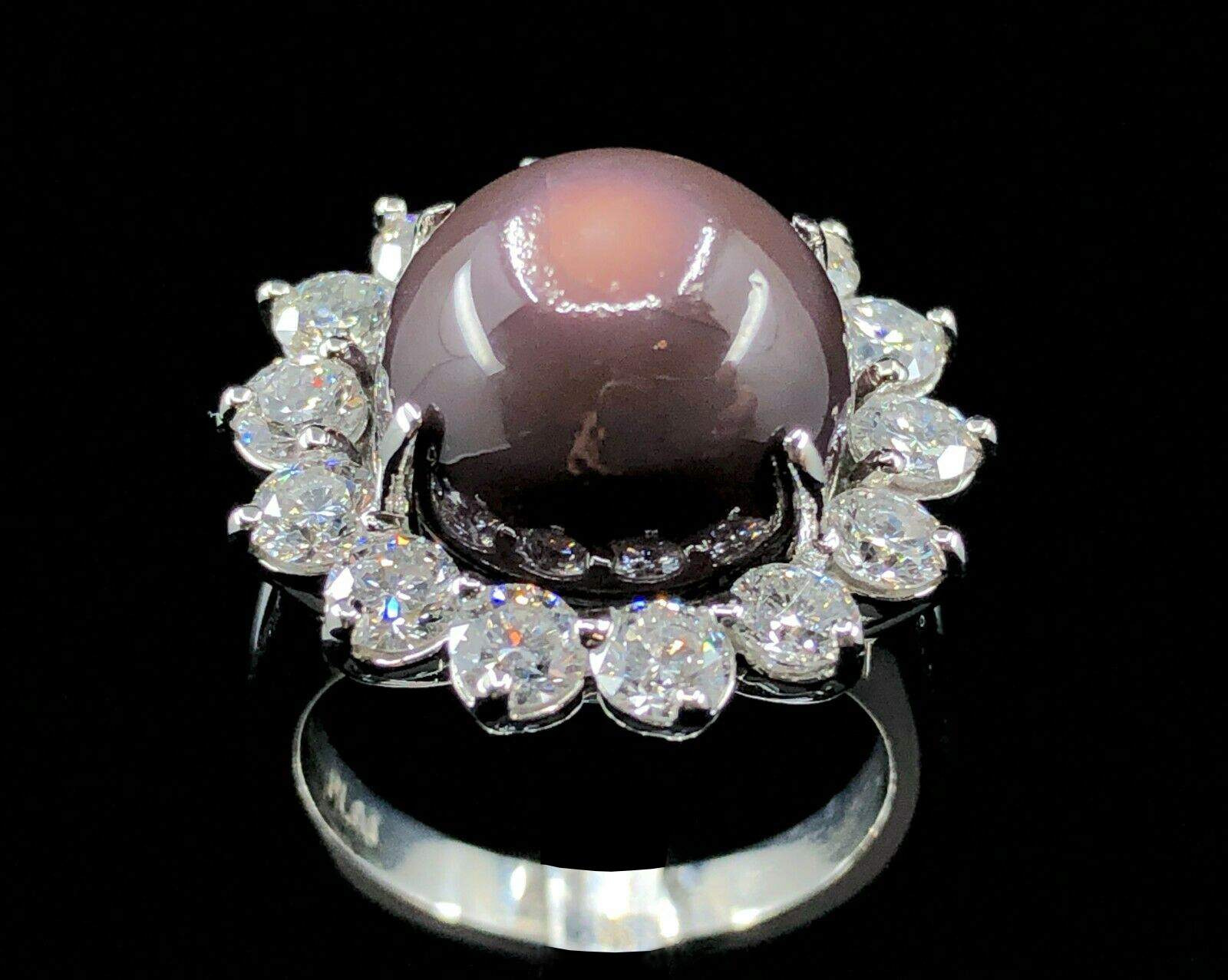
A large quahog pearl and diamond ring, in platinum.

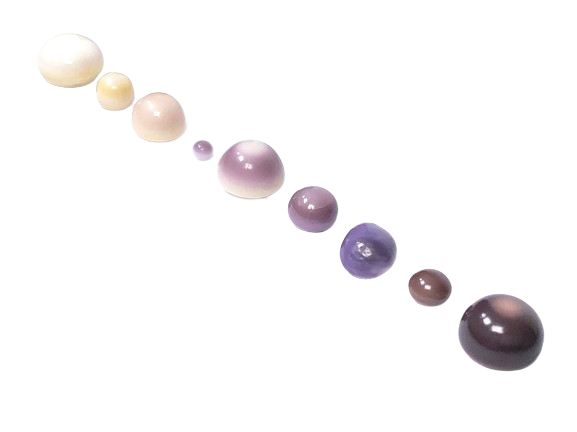
A collection of quahog pearls, ranging in color from white to purple.

The northern quahog clam is known for producing very rare and collectible, non-nacreous pearls known for their purple color. Quahog pearls are often button-shaped, and can range in color from white to lavender, to purple.
