= William Stimpson =

American marine biologist

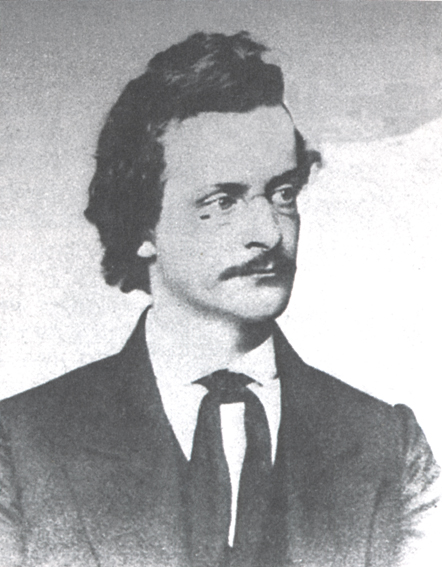
- Born: February 14, 1832; Boston, Massachusetts, US
- Died: May 26, 1872 (aged 40); Ilchester, Maryland, US
- Scientific career
- Fields: Marine biology, malacology
- Academic advisors: Louis Agassiz

William Stimpson (February 14, 1832 – May 26, 1872) was an American scientist. He was interested particularly in marine biology. Stimpson became an important early contributor to the work of the Smithsonian Institution and later, director of the Chicago Academy of Sciences.

== Biography ==
Stimpson was born in Boston, Massachusetts to Herbert Hathorne Stimpson and Mary Ann Devereau Brewer. The Stimpsons were of the colonial stock of Massachusetts, the earliest known member of the family being James Stimpson, who was married in 1661, in Milton. His mother died at an early age. William Stimpson's father was an ingenious inventor, and a leading merchant of Boston in the mid decades of the nineteenth century, trading as "H. & F. Stimpson, stoves and furnaces, corner of Congress and Water Streets. It was he who invented the "Stimpson range", the first sheet-iron cooking stove, famous in its day throughout New England. He also made improvements in rifles, and suggested the placing of the flange on the inside of railway car wheels instead of on the outside, as had been the custom. His son was to inherit his energy, love of social life, enthusiasm, and brilliant wit.

Stimpson's father moved from Roxbury and built a house in the village of Cambridge. When fourteen years of age he read with delight Edwin Swett's work on geology, and soon after this a copy of Augustus Addison Gould's Report on the Invertebrata of Massachusetts filled him with exultant enthusiasm.

He graduated from the Cambridge high school in 1848, winning the gold medal, the highest prize of the school. In September 1848 he entered the Cambridge Latin School, absorbing the mastery he displayed in the use of Latin in the description of marine animals in his Prodromus of 1857–60.

He studied under the great naturalist Louis Agassiz. He focused most of his studies on marine biology, particularly invertebrates. At the age of twenty he was appointed naturalist on the U.S. North Pacific Exploring Expedition. Between 1853 and 1856 the expedition voyaged around the world and Stimpson became the first Western naturalist to collect in Japan. He then settled in Washington, D.C., where he founded the Megatherium Club at the Smithsonian Institution. The social gatherings of this group included many of the leading naturalists of the period. For two years during the Civil War (1861–1863) many of them lived in the Smithsonian building. Although never a full-time employee of the institution, Stimpson founded the department of marine invertebrates at the Smithsonian. When fellow club member Robert Kennicott left his post as director of the Chicago Academy of Sciences in Chicago, Stimpson went to that city to take his place. When Kennicott died in Russian America (present day Alaska) in 1866, Stimpson chose to stay in Chicago out of loyalty to his friend and the academy. In 1869 the Smithsonian sent its entire collection of marine invertebrates to the academy, as Stimpson was working on a monographs of the marine invertebrates of America's East Coast. By 1871 the academy possessed one of the most extensive natural history collections in the United States. The academy's "fireproof" building was destroyed in the Great Chicago Fire of 1871 (later rebuilt), along with all of Stimpson's unpublished manuscripts and the specimens they were based upon. He traveled to Florida in the winter of 1871–1872 in an attempt to replace some of what had been lost. After minimal success he died of tuberculosis seven months after the fire in Ilchester, Maryland). He is buried in an unmarked grave in Ellicott City, Maryland.

Stimpson is credited with naming 827 valid taxa of marine invertebrates from eleven different phyla. He is primarily known for his descriptions of crustaceans and mollusks. Ronald Scott Vasile, William Stimpson and the Golden Age of American Natural History, Northern Illinois University Press, 2018.

== Species named for him ==
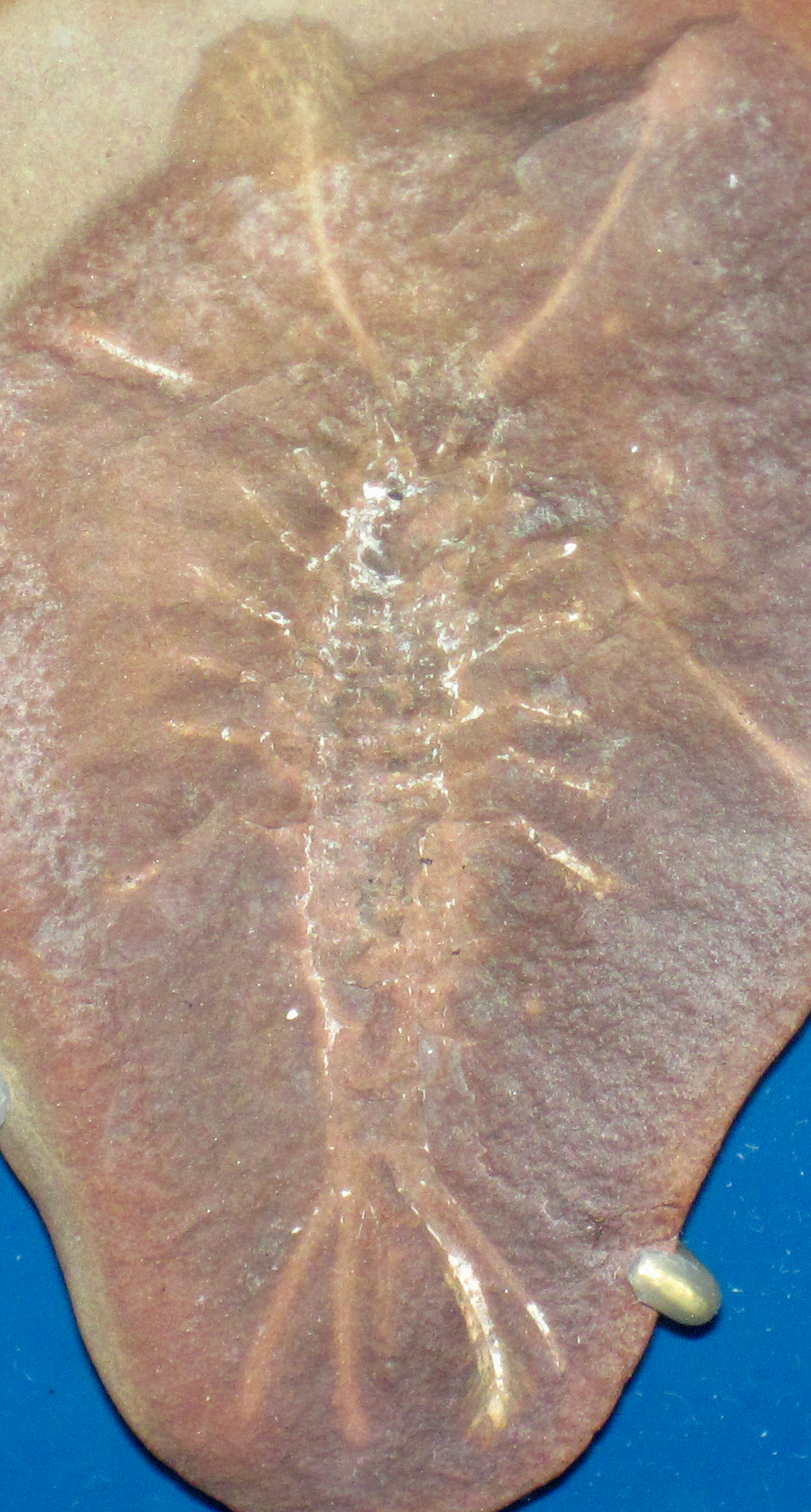
Acanthotelson stimpsoni Meek & Worthen, 1865. Field Museum.

- Rare Hawaiian Goby Fish Sicydium stimpsoni Gill, 1860
- Eel Bathycongrus stimpsoni Fowler, 1934
- Sun Starfish Solaster stimpsoni
- Stimpson coastal shrimp Heptacarpus stimpsoni
- Fossil - small aquatic arthropod Acanthotelson stimpsoni Meek & Worthen
- Striped sunstar Solaster stimpsoni
- Clam Mercenaria stimpsoni
- Yellow Cone Conus stimpsoni Dall, 1902
- Eyespot Rock Shrimp Sicyonia stimpsoni Bouvier, 1905
- Nudibranch mollusc Coryphella stimpsoni (Verrill 1879)
- Gastropod Pteropurpura stimpsoni (A. Adams, 1863)
- Gastropod Turritellopsis stimpsoni (Dall, 1919)
- genus of flowering plants (family Primulaceae), Stimpsonia (C.Wright ex A.Gray, 1859)

== Bibliography ==
- Stimpson W. (1851). Shells of New England. A revision of the synonymy of the testaceous mollusks of New England. Phillips, Samson & Co., Boston. vi + 58 pp., 2 plates.
- Stimpson W. (1864). "On the structural characters of so-called melanians of North America". The American Journal of Science and Arts (2)38: 41-53.
- Stimpson W. (1865). "On certain genera and families of zoophagous gastropods". American Journal of Conchology 1(1): 55-64, plates 8-9.
- Stimpson W. (1865). "Diagnoses of newly discovered genera of gasteropods, belonging to the sub-fam. Hydrobiinae, of the family Rissoidae". American Journal of Conchology 1: 52-54.
- Stimpson W. (1865). "Researches upon the Hydrobiinae and allied forms chiefly made upon materials in the museum of the Smithsonian Institution". Smithsonian Miscellaneous Collections 7(201): 1-59.
- Vasile, R. S. (2018). William Stimpson and the Golden Age of American Natural History (1st ed., p. 308). Northern Illinois University Press.

== See also ==
- European and American voyages of scientific exploration
- Category:Taxa named by William Stimpson
