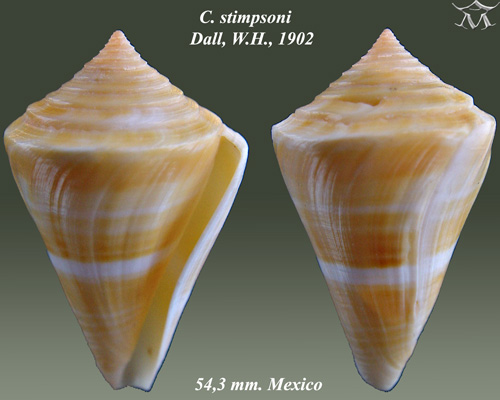
- Apertural and abapertural views of shell of Conus stimpsoni Dall, W.H., 1902
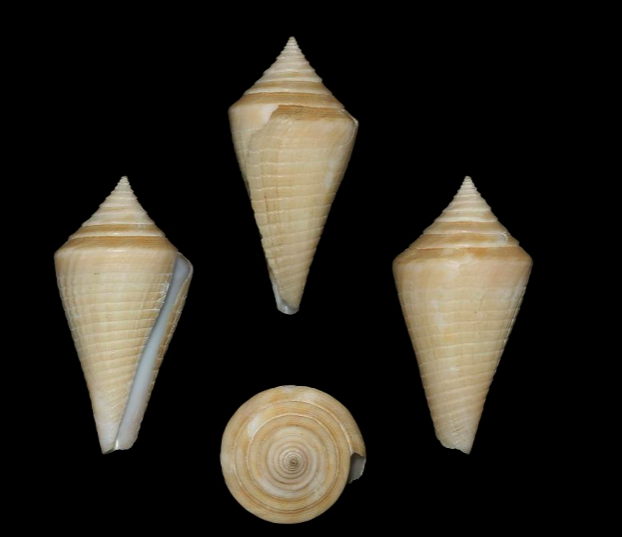

Conservation status
- Least Concern (IUCN 3.1)

Scientific classification
- Kingdom: Animalia
- Phylum: Mollusca
- Class: Gastropoda
- Subclass: Caenogastropoda
- Order: Neogastropoda
- Superfamily: Conoidea
- Family: Conidae
- Genus: Conus
- Species: C. stimpsoni

Binomial name
- Conus stimpsoni Dall, 1902

Synonyms
- Conasprelloides stimpsoni (Dall, 1902); Conus (Dauciconus) stimpsoni Dall, 1902 · accepted, alternate representation

= Conus stimpsoni =

Species of sea snail

Conus stimpsoni, common name Stimpson's cone, is a species of sea snail, a marine gastropod mollusk in the family Conidae, the cone snails and their allies.

Like all species within the genus Conus, these snails are predatory and venomous. They are capable of stinging humans, therefore live ones should be handled carefully or not at all.

== Distribution ==
This species occurs in the Caribbean Sea from Florida to Yucatan, Mexico.

== Description ==
The maximum recorded shell length is 50 mm.

Original description: The shell consists of about twelve whorls. The slopes of the spire somewhat concave, turreted. The nuclear whorl is rounded and smooth. The following four whorls are furnished with a beaded keel at the shoulder. This keel becomes entire on the subsequent whorls. Above the shoulder, the whorls are slightly concave. The suture is appressed. There are about three faint spiral grooves on the concave surface. The body whorl shows shallow squarish channels. The periostracum is thin, pale straw color, finely axially striated. The color of the shell is pinkish white, suffused with salmon pink near the shoulder and on the spire and base, with a very faint, cloudy band of the same about midway between base and shoulder.

== Habitat ==
Minimum recorded depth is 42 m. Maximum recorded depth is 196 m.
