= Mercenaria stimpsoni =

Scientific classification
- Kingdom: Animalia
- Phylum: Mollusca
- Class: Bivalvia
- Order: Venerida
- Family: Veneridae
- Genus: Mercenaria
- Species: M. stimpsoni

Binomial name
- Mercenaria stimpsoni (Gould, 1861)

Species of saltwater clam

Mercenaria stimpsoni is a species of saltwater clam.

Its maximum lifespan is at least 92 years.
