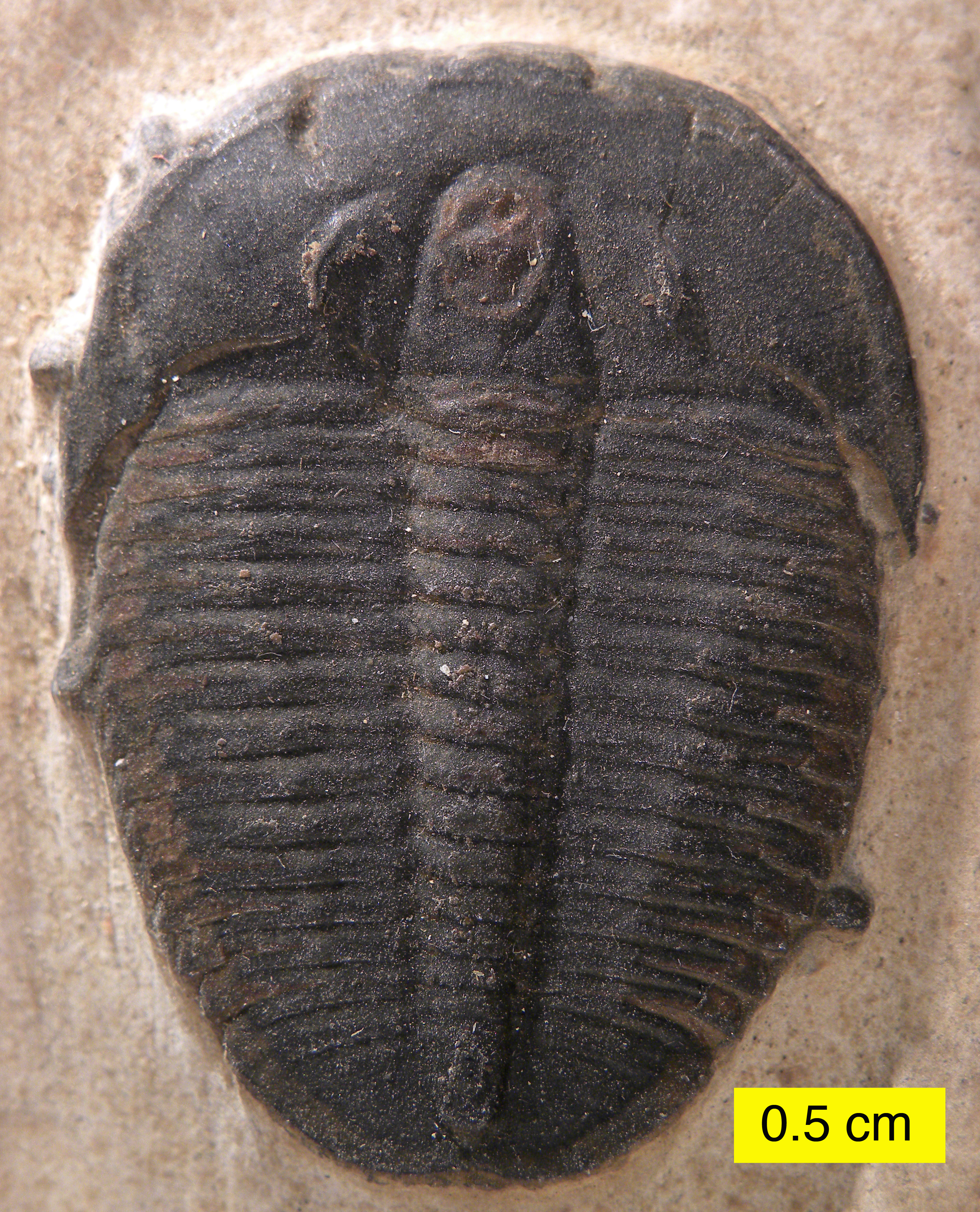
- Elrathia kingii (family Alokistocaridae) from the Wheeler Shale (Middle Cambrian), Utah.

Scientific classification
- Kingdom: Animalia
- Phylum: Arthropoda
- Clade: †Artiopoda
- Class: †Trilobita
- Order: †Ptychopariida
- Suborder: †Ptychopariina
- Superfamily: †Ptychoparioidea; Pour and Popov, 2008

Families
- See text

= Ptychoparioidea =

Ptychoparioidea Temporal range: Cambrian Stage 3–Late Ordovician

Extinct superfamily of trilobites

Ptychoparioidea is a superfamily of the Ptychopariida order of trilobites.

== Taxonomy ==
- Family Acrocephalitidae
- Family Alokistocaridae
- Family Antagmidae
- Family Asaphiscidae
- Family Atopidae
- Family Bolaspididae
- Family Cedariidae
- Family Changshaniidae
- Family Conocoryphidae
- Family Conokephalinidae
- Family Crepicephalidae
- Family Diceratocephalidae
- Family Elviniidae
- Family Eulomidae
- Family Holocephalinidae
- Family Ignotogregatidae
- Family Inouyiidae
- Family Isocolidae
- Family Kingstoniidae
- Family Lisaniidae
- Family Llanoaspididae
- Family Lonchocephalidae
- Family Lorenzellidae
- Family Mapaniidae
- Family Marjumiidae
- Family Menomoniidae
- Family Nepeidae
- Family Norwoodiidae
- Family Papyriaspididae
- Family Phylacteridae
- Family Proasaphiscidae
- Family Ptychopariidae
- Family Shumardiidae
- Family Solenopleuridae
- Family Tricrepicephalidae
- Family Utiidae
- Family Wuaniidae
