= Pierre Shale =

Geologic formation in North America

- Stratigraphic range: Campanian-Maastrichtian
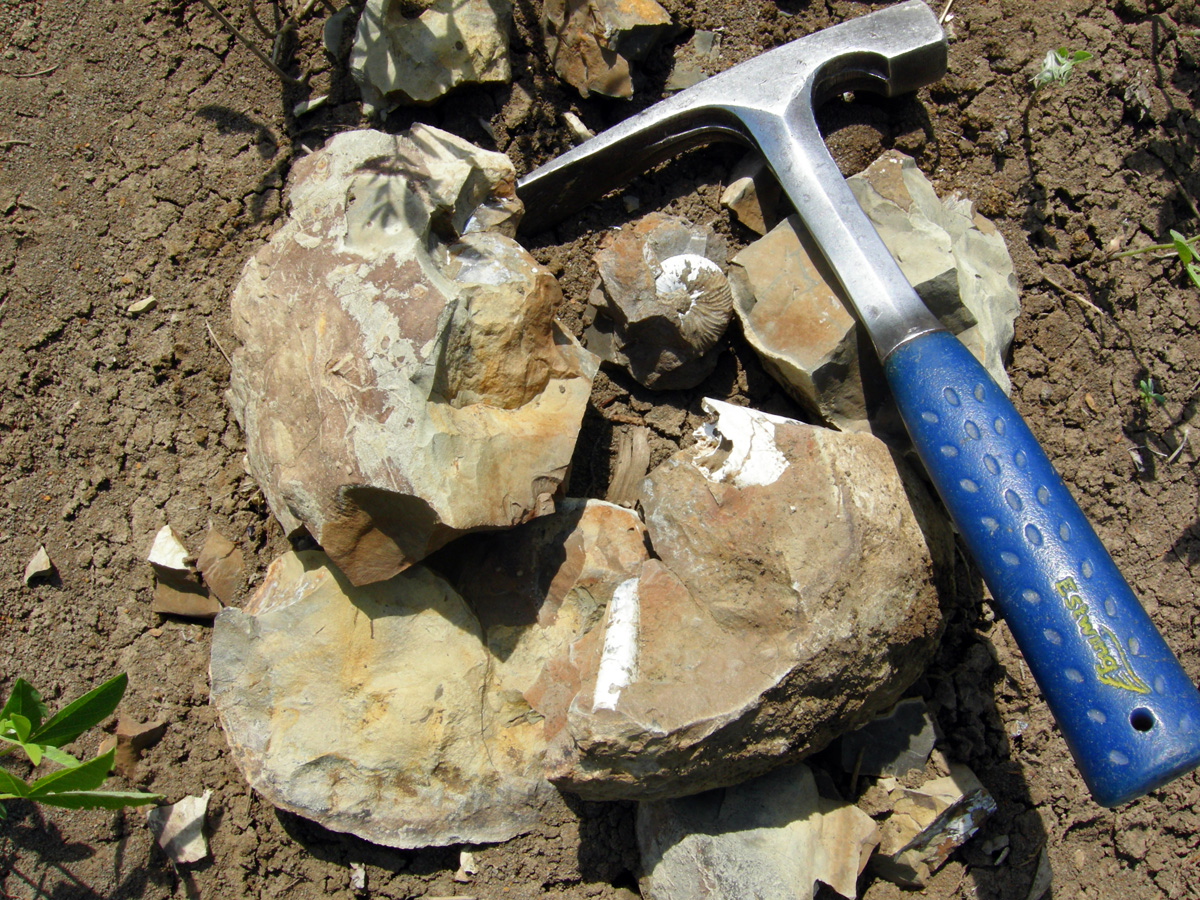
- A broken concretion with fossils inside; Late Cretaceous Pierre Shale near Ekalaka, Montana
- Type: Geological formation
- Sub-units: From oldest to youngest: Gammon Ferruginous Member; Sharon Springs Member; Mitten Black Shale Member; Red Bird Silty Member; A lower unnamed shale member; Kara Bentonitic Member; Upper unnamed shale member
- Underlies: Fox Hills Formation
- Overlies: Niobrara Formation

Lithology
- Primary: Shale

Location
- Coordinates: 44.395°N 100.412°W
- Region: North America
- Country: United States, Canada

Type section
- Named for: Fort Pierre
- Named by: Meek & Hayden, 1862
- Pierre Shale (the United States) Pierre Shale (South Dakota)

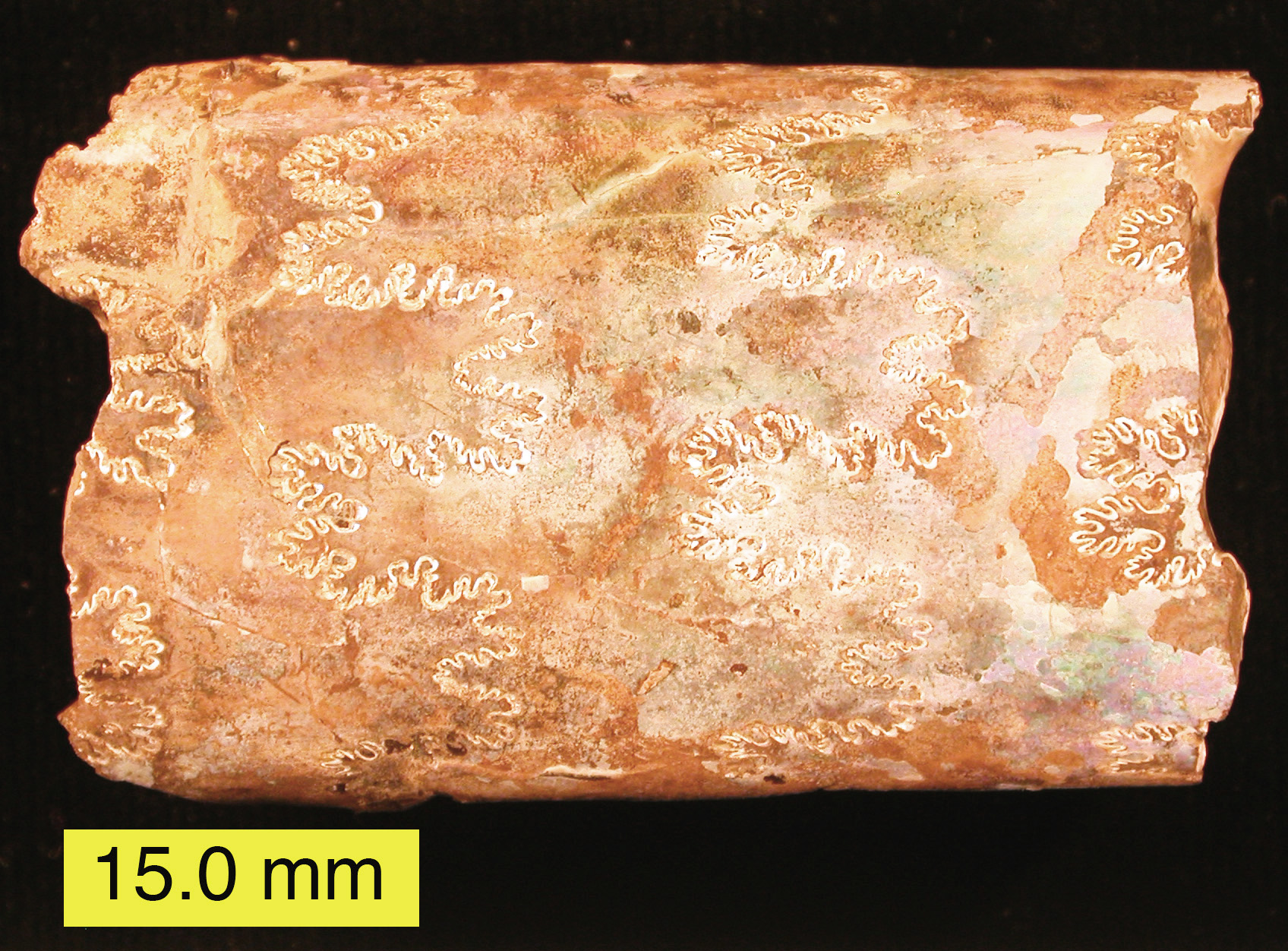
Baculites from the Pierre Shale showing sutures and remnant aragonite; western South Dakota, Late Cretaceous.

The Pierre Shale is a geologic formation or series in the Upper Cretaceous which occurs east of the Rocky Mountains in the Great Plains, from Pembina Valley in Canada to New Mexico.

The Pierre Shale was described by Meek and Hayden in 1862 in the Proceedings of the Academy of Sciences (Philadelphia). They described it as a dark-gray shale, fossiliferous, with veins and seams of gypsum, and concretions of iron oxide. The Pierre Shale is about 3,138 feet (956m) thick at the type locality. It overlies the Niobrara division and underlies the Fox Hills beds. It was named for an occurrence near Fort Pierre on the Missouri River in South Dakota.

The Pierre Shale is of marine origin and was deposited in the Western Interior Seaway. It is correlative with other marine shales that occur farther west, such as the Bearpaw Shale, Mancos Shale and the Lewis Shale. It correlates with the Lea Park Formation in central Alberta. The Pierre is overlain by marginal marine deposits of the Fox Hills Formation.

Most of the formation was deposited in the Campanian Age of the late Cretaceous. However, the discovery of fossils of Baculites baculus in the uppermost beds of the Pierre Shale in the Raton, New Mexico area show that deposition continued here into the early Maastrichtian.

== Mineral resources ==
The Pierre Shale is the host formation for commercial petroleum deposits in the Florence and Cañon City fields in Fremont County, Colorado, and the Boulder Oil Field in Boulder County, Colorado. More recently, natural gas has been extracted in the Raton Basin in southern Colorado. The shale formation is usually too impermeable for hydrocarbon extraction, but produces in areas where it is naturally fractured or fractured by artificial means.

== Paleofauna ==
Color key: Taxon / Reclassified taxon / Taxon falsely reported as present / Dubious taxon or junior synonym / Ichnotaxon / Ootaxon / Morphotaxon	Notes; Uncertain or tentative taxa are in small text; ~~crossed out~~ taxa are discredited.

=== Reptiles ===
==== Dinosaurs ====
Birds reported from the Pierre Shale Formation
Genus	Species	Location	Stratigraphic position	Material	Notes	Images
Brodavis	B. varneri	South Dakota	Sharon Springs Member.		A hesperornithiform.	
Brodavis	B. sp.	Manitoba	Pembina Member.		A hesperornithiform.	
Hesperornis	H. bairdi	South Dakota	Sharon Springs Member.		A hesperornithid.	
Hesperornis	H. chowi	Manitoba & South Dakota	Pembina, Millwood, & Sharon Springs Members.		A hesperornithid.	
Hesperornis	H. lumgairi	Manitoba	Pembina Member.		A hesperornithid.	
Hesperornis	H. macdonaldi	Manitoba & South Dakota.	Gammon, Pembina, Millwood(?), & Sharon Springs Members.		A hesperornithid.	
Hesperornis	H. mengeli	Manitoba & South Dakota.	Pembina & Sharon Springs Members.		A hesperornithid.	
Hesperornis	H. regalis	Manitoba, South Dakota, & Kansas	Gammon, Pembina, & Sharon Springs Members.		A hesperornithid.	
Hesperornis	H. sp.	Manitoba.	Pembina Member.		Probably referrable to H. regalis, but indistinguishable from H. crassipes.	
Hesperornithidae	Gen. et. sp. indeterminate	Manitoba.	Pembina Member.	Multiple isolated synascra.	A hesperornithid.	
Hesperornithiformes	Fam., gen. et sp. indet.	Manitoba.	Pembina Member.	Multiple vertebrae, phalanges, tibiotarsal fragments and a fibula.		
Ichthyornis	I. sp.	Manitoba.	Pembina Member.	"MDM B77.03.07 (vertebral centrum), B80.05.14 (femur)".	An ichthyornithe.	

Ornithischians reported from the Pierre Shale Formation
Genus	Species	Location	Stratigraphic position	Material	Notes	Images
Claosaurus	C. affinis	South Dakota.		"Pedal phalanx (lost)."	Currently considered dubious.	

==== Mosasaurs ====
Mosasaurs reported from the Pierre Shale Formation
Genus	Species	Location	Stratigraphic position	Material	Notes	Images
Clidastes	C. propython	Manitoba.	Pembina Member.	MDM M74.10.06 (skull, mandible, vertebral column).	A mosasaurine also known from the Mooreville Chalk.	
Clidastes		Western Kansas.		Vertebrae associated with 'Plesiosaurus' gulo currently lost.	Likely represents the stomach contents of 'Plesiosaurus' gulo.	
Globidens	G. dakotensis	South Dakota.	Sharon Springs Member.	FMNH PR 846.	A globidensin.	
Globidens	G. schurmanni	At the Big Bend of the Missouri River, Buffalo County, South Dakota.	Uppermost DeGrey Formation.	"SDSM 74764, partial anterior skeleton, including cranium, jaws, cervical and trunk vertebrae partially articulated, pectoral girdles, partial anterior paddle, isolated humerus and ulna, and isolated caudal vertebrae".		
Globidens	G. sp.	Northwestern Logan County, Kansas.	Upper level of the Sharon Springs Member.	A nearly complete right dentary (FHSM VP–13828).	A globidensin.	
Hainosaurus	H. pembinensis	Near Morden, Manitoba.	Pembina Member.		Reassigned to the genus Tylosaurus.	
Jormungandr	J. walhallaensis	Cavalier County, North Dakota.	Pembina Member.	Partial skull & skeleton.	A mosasaurine.	
Latoplatecarpus	L. nichollsae	"19 km northwest of Morden, Manitoba".	Pembina Member.	A skeleton (CMN 52261).	A plioplatecarpine.	
Mosasauridae	Subfam., gen. et. sp. indeterminate	Manitoba.	Pembina Member.	Fragmentary specimens consisting "mostly of vertebral scraps, ribs and flipper elements".		
Mosasaurus	M. conodon	"South Dakota".			A mosasaurine.	
Mosasaurus	M. missouriensis	"South Dakota".			A mosasaurine.	
Platecarpus	P. coryphaeus		Pembina Member.		Now deemed synonymous with P. tympaniticus.	
Platecarpus	P. ictericus		Pembina Member.		Now deemed synonymous with P. tympaniticus.	
Platecarpus	P. somenensis		Pembina Member.		Found to nest within Latoplatecarpus nichollsae.	
Platecarpus	P. tympaniticus		Pembina Member.	Abundant specimens.	A pliopatecarpine and the most abundant mosasaur of the Pierre Shale.	
Platecarpus	P. sp.	Manitoba.	Pembina Member.	"Isolated skull elements, humeri and pectoral girdles".	Probably referrable to P. tympaniticus based on size, but size alone is deemed insufficient for species identification.	
Plioplatecarpinae	Gen. et. sp. indeterminate	Manitoba.	Pembina Member.	Poorly preserved and unprepared remains.		
Plioplatecarpus	P. nichollsae	"19 km northwest of Morden, Manitoba".	Pembina Member.	A skeleton (CMN 52261).	Reassigned to the genus Latoplatecarpus.	
Prognathodon	P. overtoni	South Dakota.	Virgin Creek Member.	KUVP 950 (the holotype for the species) and SDSM 3339.	A mosasaurine also found in the Bearpaw Shale.	
Tylosaurinae	Gen. et. sp. indet.	Manitoba.	Pembina Member.	Isolated limb and girdle elements (MDM M74.28.05, M75.20.06, M82.13.17, M84.09.18).		
Tylosaurus	T. pembinensis	Near Morden, Manitoba.	Pembina Member.		A tylosaurine.	
Tylosaurus	T. proriger	Manitoba.	Pembina Member.	MDM M77.17.07 quadrate, FMNH PR 591 quadrate, pubis, vertebrae.	A tylosaurine.	
Tylosaurus	T. rex	Kansas	Sharon Springs Member	KUVP 5033 and FHSM VP-2496	A tylosaurine.	

==== Plesiosaurs ====
Plesiosaurs reported from the Pierre Shale Formation
Genus	Species	Location	Stratigraphic position	Material	Notes	Images
Alzadasaurus	A. pembertonii	South Dakota.	Sharon Springs Member.	Complete specimen (SDSM 451).	Synonymized with Styxosaurus snowii.	
Alzadasaurus	cf. A. pembertonii	Manitoba.	Pembina Member.	A specimen consisting of two femora, one humerus, two epipodials, fragments of the pelvic girdle and 14 vertebrae (MDM P83.02. 18).	Synonymized with Styxosaurus snowii.	
Elasmosauridae	Gen. et. sp. indeterminate	Manitoba.	Pembina Member.		Remains undiagnostic at the generic level.	
Elasmosauridae		Logan County, Kansas.	Upper Sharon Springs Member.	KUVP 129744, a specimen associated with 47 gastroliths.	An elasmosaurid too fragmentary to identify below the family level.	
Elasmosaurus	E. platyurus	Kansas.	Sharon Springs member.	Multiple specimens, including the holotype.	An elasmosaurid.	
Elasmosaurus	?E. sp.	Manitoba.	Pembina Member.	"An incomplete specimen (TMP P84.162.4), consisting of pelvic girdle, distal end of a propodial, an epipodial and 21 vertebrae".		
Martinectes	M. bonneri	Wyoming & South Dakota.	Sharon Springs Member and Pembina Member.	2 specimens: an adult (UNSM 50133) and a juvenile (UNSM 55810), and several others.	A polycotylid.	
Plesiosauria	Fam., gen. et. sp. indeterminate		Pembina Member.	"Specimens consisting mostly of ribs, caudal vertebrae, broken girdle plates and phalanges".	"Further identification is not possible due to poor preservation and the incomplete nature of the material".	
'Plesiosaurus'	'P.' gulo	Western Kansas.		KUVP 1329 (the original specimen consisted of "eleven cervical, thirteen dorsal, and seven or eight other vertebrae" but now only 3 vertebrae remain).	An elasmosaurid associated with the remains of a mosasaur (likely Clidastes), representing the stomach contents of the plesiosaur.	
Polycotylidae	Gen. et. sp. indeterminate	Morden area, Manitoba.	Pembina Member.	Many isolated vertebrae and partial skull remains.	A polycotylid.	
Serpentisuchops	S. pfisterae	Wyoming.	Upper half of the upper member.	"Specimen GPM5001".	A polycotylid.	
Styxosaurus	S. snowii	South Dakota.	Sharon Springs Member.	Complete specimen (SDSM 451).	An elasmosaurid originally reported as Alzadasaurus pembertoni.	
Styxosaurus	cf. S. snowii	Manitoba.	Pembina Member.	A specimen consisting of two femora, one humerus, two epipodials, fragments of the pelvic girdle and 14 vertebrae (MDM P83.02. 18).	An elasmosaurid originally reported as cf. Alzadasaurus pembertoni.	
Styxosaurus		Kansas.	Sharon Springs Member.	NJSM 15435.	An elasmosaurid tentatively assigned to the genus Styxosaurus.	
Trinacromerum	T. bonneri	Wyoming & South Dakota.	Sharon Springs Member and Pembina Member.	2 specimens: an adult (UNSM 50133) and a juvenile (UNSM 55810), and several others.	Now moved to the genus Martinectes.	
Trinacromerum	T. cf. T. kirki	Manitoba.	Pembina Member.	TMP P84.162.3.	A polycotylid.	
Trinacromerum	T. sp.	Manitoba.	Pembina Member.	Many poorly preserved specimens.	A polycotylid.	
Unktaheela	U. specta	Wyoming and South Dakota.	Sharon Springs Member.	UCM 35059 (holotype) and SDSM 142501 (paratype).	A polycotylid.	

==== Pterosaurs ====
Pterosaurs reported from the Pierre Shale Formation
Genus	Species	Location	Stratigraphic position	Material	Notes	Images
Pteranodon	P. longiceps	Kansas, Wyoming & South Dakota.	Sharon Springs Member.	A skull and multiple postcranial elements.	A pteranodontid.	

==== Turtles ====
Turtles reported from the Pierre Shale Formation
Genus	Species	Location	Stratigraphic position	Material	Notes	Images
Archelon	A. ischyros	Along the Cheyenne River in Custer County, South Dakota.			A protostegid.	
Archelon	A. sp.	Colfax County, New Mexico.		3 carapace fragments (NMMNHP-16079 and P-16104).	A protostegid.	
Protostega	P. sp.	Manitoba.	Pembina Member.	MDM T75.01.06.	A protostegid.	
Testudines	Fam., gen. et sp. indet.	Manitoba.	Pembina Member.		Remains only identifiable as "small turtles", probably referrable to Toxochelys latiremis.	
Toxochelys	T. latiremis	Kansas & Manitoba.	Pembina Member.			

=== Fish ===
==== Bony fish ====
Bony fish reported from the Pierre Shale Formation
Genus	Species	Presence	Stratigraphic position	Material	Notes	Images
Apsopelix	A. sp. cf. A. anglicus	Hughes County, South Dakota.	Upper DeGrey Formation.	SDSM 77482.	A crossognathid.	
Bananogmius	B. evolutus	Manitoba.	Pembina Member.	An articulated skull (MDM F75.05.06).	Reassigned to the genus Pentanogmius.	
Bananogmius	B. sp.	Near Thornhill, Manitoba.	Pembina Member.	Skull and vertebral column (MMMN V82).	Specimen originally identified as Ananogmius sp.	
Cimolichthys	C. nepaholica	Manitoba.	Pembina Member.		An aulopiform.	
Cylindracanthus		Hyde County, South Dakota.	Verendrye Formation.	A rostral spine (SDSM 30638).		
Enchodus	E. gladiolus		Sharon Springs Member.		An aulopiform.	
Enchodus	E. petrosus	Manitoba.	Pembina Member and Sharon Springs Member.		An aulopiform.	
Enchodus	E. cf. saevus	Manitoba.	Pembina Member.	FMNH PF 5391 (a dentary, maxilla and palatine).	Now a junior synonym of E. petrosus.	
Enchodus	E. sp.	Manitoba.	Pembina Member.	2 isolated vertebrae and isolated palatal fangs.	An aulopiform.	
Ichthyodectes	I. ctenodon	Manitoba.	Pembina Member.	Multiple mandibles and some skull and vertebral material.	An ichthyodectid.	
Ichthyodectidae	Gen. et. sp. indet.	Manitoba.	Pembina Member.	Vertebrae and partial caudal fins.	An ichthyodectid not referrable to Xiphactinus but indistinguishable from other ichthyodectid genera.	
Pachyrhizodus	P. caninus	Manitoba.	Pembina Member.	A skull and anterior portions of the body (MDM F74.04.06), and a right dentary (FMNH PF 5397).	A pachyrhizodontid.	
Pachyrhizodus	P. minimus	Manitoba.	Pembina Member.	FMNH PF 5402.	A pachyrhizodontid.	
Pachyrhizodus	P. sp.	Manitoba.	Pembina Member.	2 isolated vertebral centra (MMMN V73 ).	A pachyrhizodontid.	
Pachyrhizodus	P. sp. indet.	Hughes County, South Dakota.	DeGrey Formation.	SDSM 77481.	A pachyrhizodontid.	
Pentanogmius	P. evolutus	Manitoba.	Pembina Member.	An articulated skull (MDM F75.05.06).	A plethodid, originally reported as Bananogmius evolutus.	
Protosphyraena	P. gladius	Hyde County, South Dakota.	DeGrey Formation.	SDSM 66288 (major portion of pectoral fin).	A pachycormid.	
Protosphyraena	P. sp.	Manitoba.	Pembina Member.	A left premaxilla (FMNH PF 5400).	Probably represents P. gladius.	
Stratodus	S. apicalis	Manitoba.	Pembina Member.		An aulopiform.	
Teleostei	Order, fam., gen. et. sp. indet.	Manitoba.	Pembina Member.	Mostly vertebrae, but also caudal fins and skulls in some specimens.		
Xiphactinus	X. audax	Manitoba and Lyman County, South Dakota.	Pembina Member and middle part of the Sharon Springs Member.		An ichthyodectid.	

==== Cartilaginous fish ====
Cartilaginous fish reported from the Pierre Shale Formation
Genus	Species	Presence	Stratigraphic position	Material	Notes	Images
Archaeolamna	A. kopingensis	Western Kansas.	Sharon Springs Member.	A partial skeleton with articulated teeth.	An archaeolamnid.	
Cretalamna	C. appendiculata	Manitoba.	Pembina Member.	Vertebral centra.	A megatoothed shark.	
Euselachii	Fam., gen. et sp. indet.	Near Thornhill, Manitoba.	Pembina Member.	"Three vertebral centra, 15 mm in diameter".	Probably represents Squalicorax, but also indistinguishable from juvenile specimens of Cretalamna.	
Squalicorax	S. sp. aff. S. kaupi	Manitoba.	Pembina Member.	"MDM S80.01.14 (2 teeth), FMNH PF 5399 (1 tooth)".	An anacoracid.	

=== Marine vertebrates ===
- Gillicus
- Pseudocorax
- Carcharias

=== Invertebrates ===
==== Annelids ====
Annelids reported from the Pierre Shale Formation
Genus	Species	Location	Stratigraphic position	Material	Notes	Images
Diploconcha	D. sp.	Wyoming.				

==== Arthropods ====
Arthropods reported from the Pierre Shale Formation
Genus	Species	Location	Stratigraphic position	Material	Notes	Images
Dioratiopus	D. hearttailensis	Butte County, South Dakota.	Gammon Ferruginous Member.		A longodromitid crab.	
Dromiopsis	D. kimberlyae	Butte County, South Dakota.	Lower Pierre Shale.	2 specimens.	A dynomenid crab.	
Heus	H. foersteri	Tepee Buttes, South Dakota.			A raninid crab.	
Hoplitocarcinus?	H.? punctatus	Tepee Buttes, Colorado.			A crab.	
Hoploparia	H. mickelsoni	Butte County, South Dakota.	Gammon Ferruginous Member.		A lobster.	
Limulus	L. coffini	Fort Collins, Colorado.	Rocky Ridge Sandstone Member.	Thoracetron.	A horseshoe crab.	
Necrocarcinus	N. davisi	Butte County, South Dakota.	Gammon Ferruginous Member.		A necrocarcinid crab.	
Plagiophthalmus	P. bjorki	Tepee Buttes, South Dakota.			A prosopid crab.	
Protocallianassa	P. russelli	Butte County, South Dakota.	Gammon Ferruginous Member.		A mud shrimp.	
Raninella	R. manningi	Tepee Buttes, South Dakota.			A raninid crab.	
Raninella	R. oaheensis	Butte County, South Dakota.	Gammon Ferruginous Member.		A raninid crab.	
Rugafarius	R. fredrichi	Butte County, South Dakota.	Gammon Ferruginous Member.		A spiny lobster.	
Xanthosia	X. elegans occidentalis	Butte County, South Dakota.	Gammon Ferruginous Member.		A xanthid crab.	
Zygastrocarcinus	Z. cardsmithi	Carter County, Montana.	Groat Sandstone Bed, Gammon Ferruginous Member.		A homolid crab.	

==== Bivalves ====
Bivalves reported from the Pierre Shale Formation
Genus	Species	Location	Stratigraphic position	Material	Notes	Images
Cataceramus?	C.? barabini	Northeastern New Mexico.			An inoceramid.	
Cataceramus?	C.? cf. C. barabini	Northeastern New Mexico.			An inoceramid.	
Chlamys	C. (Chlamys) nebrascensis	Bowman County, North Dakota.	Probably from the Baculites reesidei Zone.		A pectinid.	
Cuspidaria	C. sp.	Bowman County, North Dakota.		6 poorly-preserved, broken, decorticated specimens.	A cuspidariid.	
Cymbophora	C. cf. C. gracilis	Bowman County, North Dakota.		9 complete specimens.	A mactrid.	
Eriphylopsis	E. gregaria	Bowman County, North Dakota.	Probably from the Baculites reesidei Zone.	40 complete and incomplete specimens.	An astartid.	
Gervillia	G. sp.	Bowman County, North Dakota.		One badly decorticated incomplete specimen.		
Inoceramus	I. (Endocostea) barabini	Bowman County, North Dakota.	Probably from the Baculites reesidei Zone.	About 25 specimens.	An inoceramid.	
Inoceramus	I. (Endocostea) fribrosa	Bowman County, North Dakota.		4 small incomplete specimens.	An inoceramid.	
Inoceramus	I. oblongus	West of Cimarron.			An inoceramid.	
Inoceramus	I. sagensis	Bowman County, North Dakota.			An inoceramid.	
Inoceramus	I. (Cremnoceramus) sp.	Bowman County, North Dakota.		One decorticated incomplete specimen.	An inoceramid.	
Inoceramus	I. sp. A	Bowman County, North Dakota.		One specimen that is badly decorticated.	An inoceramid.	
Inoceramus	I. sp. B	Bowman County, North Dakota.		One slightly crushed specimen.	An inoceramid.	
Limopsis	L. parvula	Bowman County, North Dakota.	Probably from the Baculites reesidei Zone.	About 40 specimens.	A limopsid.	
Lucina	L. (Lucina) occidentalis	Bowman County, North Dakota.		14 specimens.	A lucinid.	
Mactra	M. sp.	Bowman County, North Dakota.		4 broken incomplete molds.	A mactrid.	
Malletia	M. evansi	Bowman County, North Dakota.	Probably from the Baculites reesidei Zone.	"7 badly decorticated incomplete specimens".	A malletiid.	
Malletia	M. sp.	Bowman County, North Dakota.	Probably from the Baculites reesidei Zone.	7 small, almost complete specimens.	A malletiid.	
Modiolus	M. meekii	Bowman County, North Dakota.	Probably from the Baculites reesidei Zone.	2 small incomplete internal molds.		
Nemodon	N. sulcatinus	Bowman County, North Dakota.	Probably from the Baculites reesidei Zone.	One badly weathered internal mold.	A parallelodontid.	
Nucula	N. sp.	Bowman County, North Dakota.		"Five badly decorticated incomplete specimens".	A nuculid.	
Ostrea	O. congesta	Bowman County, North Dakota.	Probably from the Baculites reesidei Zone.	3 slightly crushed fragments.	An ostreid.	
Ostrea	O. sp.	Bowman County, North Dakota.		Numerous fragments.	An ostreid.	
Protocardia	P. (Leptocardia) rara	Bowman County, North Dakota.		"10 complete, decorticated specimens".	A cardiid.	
Pteria	P. linguaeformis	Bowman County, North Dakota.		About 15 broken specimens.	A pteriid.	
?Syncyclonema	?S. rigida	Bowman County, North Dakota.		2 right valves.	An entoliid.	

==== Brachiopods ====
Brachiopods reported from the Pierre Shale Formation
Genus	Species	Location	Stratigraphic position	Material	Notes	Images
Lingula	L. sp.	Wyoming.	Lower unnamed shale member.			

==== Cephalopods ====
Cephalopods reported from the Pierre Shale Formation
Genus	Species	Location	Stratigraphic position	Material	Notes	Images
Baculites	B. baculus	New Mexico.	Upper & uppermost Pierre Shale.		An ammonite.	
Baculites	B. cf. baculus	Bowman County, North Dakota.	Baculites reesidei Range Zone.	1 broken specimen.	An ammonite.	
Baculites	B. compressus	At the Big Bend of the Missouri River, Buffalo County, South Dakota.	Uppermost DeGrey Formation.		Specimens associated with Globidens schurmanni.	
Baculites	B. cf. B. eliasi	Northeastern New Mexico.			An ammonite.	
Baculites	B. grandis?	Bowman County, North Dakota.		One large, crushed, badly weathered specimen.	An ammonite.	
Baculites	B. reesidei	Bowman County, North Dakota.	Baculites reesidei Zone.	11 broken specimens.	An ammonite.	
Baculites	B. sp.	Bowman County, North Dakota.	Upper Baculites reesidei Zone.	10 broken exfoliated specimens.	An ammonite.	
Baculites	B. sp.	Northeastern New Mexico.			An ammonite.	
Belemnitella	B. bulbosa		Upper Pierre Shale.		A belemnite also found in the Fox Hills Formation.	
Belemnitella	B.? sp.	Meade County, South Dakota.	Baculites compressus zone.	1 specimen (BHI-7009).	A belemnite.	
Didymoceras	D. cochleatum	South Dakota & Wyoming.	Gregory & Red Bird Silty members.	Numerous fragments.	An ammonite.	
Didymoceras	D. nebrascense	"Northwestern New Mexico through northeastern Montana".			An ammonite.	
Didymoceras	D. sp.	Colfax County, New Mexico.			An ammonite.	
Enchoteuthis	E. cobbani	Meade & Pennington counties, South Dakota.	Baculites cuneatus Zone & possibly the underlying B. compressus Zone.	2 specimens.	A coleoid, originally described as Tusoteuthis cobbani.	
Enchoteuthis	E. melanae	Niobrara County, Wyoming.	Baculites obtusus zone, Sharon Springs Member.	Multiple specimens.	A coleoid.	
Eutrephoceras	E. dekayi	Colorado, Bowman County, North Dakota and Colfax County, New Mexico.	Probably from the Baculites reesidei Zone.		A nautiloid, one specimen from Colorado showing signs of mosasaur predation.	
Eutrephoceras	E. montanaensis	Northeastern New Mexico.			A nautiloid.	
Exiteloceras	E. sp.	Bowman County, North Dakota.		One fragmented body chamber.	A nostoceratid ammonite.	
Hoploscaphites	H. brevis	Bowman County, North Dakota.		"Ten almost complete specimens and many fragments of early whorls".	An ammonite.	
Hoploscaphites	H. crassus	Montana & Wyoming.			An ammonite.	
Hoploscaphites	H. criptonodosus	Montana, Wyoming, Colorado, and possibly South Dakota.	"Upper part of the Baculites baculus Zone and overlying B. grandis Zone".		An ammonite also found in the Bearpaw Shale.	
Hoploscaphites	H. macer	Montana, Wyoming & Colorado.	"Upper part of the Baculites baculus Zone and lower part of the overlying B. grandis Zone".		An ammonite also found in the Bearpaw Shale.	
Hoploscaphites	H. cf. H. nicolleti	Bowman County, North Dakota.		2 specimens.	An ammonite.	
Hoploscaphites	H. nodosus	Near Raton, New Mexico.	"30-45 m below the top of the Pierre Shale".		An ammonite.	
Hoploscaphites	H. peterseni	Montana & Wyoming.			An ammonite.	
Hoploscaphites	H. plenus	Montana, Wyoming & North Dakota.			An ammonite.	
Hoploscaphites	H. quadrangularis	Bowman County, North Dakota.	Probably from the Baculites reesidei Zone.	One broken shaft with aperture.	An ammonite.	
Hoploscaphites	H. sp.	Bowman County, North Dakota.		One broken specimen.	An ammonite.	
Hoploscaphites	H. sp.	Colfax County, New Mexico.			An ammonite.	
Jeletzkytes	J. nodosus	At the Big Bend of the Missouri River, Buffalo County, South Dakota.	Uppermost DeGrey Formation.		Specimens associated with Globidens schurmanni.	
Placenticeras	P. intercalere	Bowman County, North Dakota.		"One decorticated specimen badly fractured by calcite crystal growth".	An ammonite.	
Placenticeras	P. meeki	Colfax County, New Mexico and Bowman County, North Dakota.	Baculites reesidei Zone.		An ammonite.	
Placenticeras	P. newberryi	Colfax County, New Mexico.			An ammonite.	
Ponteixites	P. robustus	Eastern Montana.			Now a junior synonym of Rhaeboceras.	
Rhaeboceras	R. burkholderi	Dawson County, Montana.	Upper part of the Pierre Shale (Baculites eliasi zone).		An ammonite.	
Rhaeboceras	R. cedarense	Dawson County, Montana.	Baculites baculus/grandis zone.		An ammonite.	
Rhaeboceras	R. robustus	Eastern Montana.			An ammonite.	
Scaphites	S. nodosus	Near Raton.	"About 15 m below the top of the Pierre Shale".		An ammonite.	
Solenoceras	S. sp.	Bowman County, North Dakota.		3 fragmented specimens.	A nostoceratid ammonite.	
Tusoteuthis	T. cobbani	Meade & Pennington counties, South Dakota.	Baculites cuneatus Zone & possibly the underlying B. compressus Zone.	2 specimens.	Moved to the genus Enchoteuthis.	
Tusoteuthis	T. longa	South Dakota.	Baculites compressus Zone.		A coleoid.	
Uluciala	U. rotundata	South Dakota	Baculites compressus/cuneatus Zone	Two lower beaks, represented by digital files of tomography data	A coeloid showing intermediate morphology between Sepiida (cuttlefish) and Sepiolida (bobtail squid)	

==== Echinoderms ====
Echinoderms reported from the Pierre Shale Formation
Genus	Species	Location	Stratigraphic position	Material	Notes	Images
Betelgeusia	B. brezinai	Pennington County, South Dakota.	Didymoceras cheyennensis Zone.		A starfish.	
Brezinacantha	B. tolis	Pennington County, South Dakota.	Didymoceras cheyennensis Zone.	Multiple specimens.	A brittle star.	
Coulonia		Southern Colorado.	Top of the Pierre Shale.		An astropectinid starfish.	
Eurysalenia	E. minima	Wyoming.			A sea urchin.	
Lakotacrinus	L. brezinai	South Dakota.			A crinoid.	
Pedicellasterinae?	Gen. et. sp. indeterminate	Pennington County, South Dakota	Didymoceras cheyennensis zone.	One small arm fragment (AMNH-FI 111853).	A starfish.	

==== Gastropods ====
Gastropods
Genus	Species	Location	Stratigraphic position	Material	Notes	Images
Anchura?	A.? sp.	Bowman County, North Dakota.	Probably from the Baculites reesidei Zone.	"One broken, badly decorticated, medium-sized specimen".		
Anisomyon	A. sexsulcatus?	Bowman County, North Dakota.	Probably from the Baculites reesidei Zone.	"One badly decorticated specimen that is essentially an internal mold".	A siphonariid.	
Anisomyon		At the Big Bend of the Missouri River, Buffalo County, South Dakota.	Uppermost DeGrey Formation.		A siphonariid, specimens associated with Globidens schurmanni.	
Atira	A. nebrascensis	Bowman County, North Dakota.	Probably from the Baculites reesidei Zone.	3 decorticated specimens.		
Cylichna	C. sp.	Bowman County, North Dakota.	"Baculites reesidei Zone".	"One weathered specimen so badly decorticated that it is essentially a mold of the interior".		
Cylindrotruncatum	C. cf. C. demursum	Bowman County, North Dakota.	Probably from the Baculites reesidei Zone.	"One, small, broken, badly decorticated specimen".		
Cylindrotruncatum	C. sp.	Bowman County, North Dakota.	Probably from the Baculites reesidei Zone.	"Two medium-sized specimens; one in excellent condition and one internal mold".		
Drepanochilus	D. sp.	Bowman County, North Dakota.	Probably from the Baculites reesidei Zone.	Approximately 20 specimens.		
Euspira	E. obliquata	Bowman County, North Dakota.	Baculites reesidei Zone.	25 nearly complete specimens.		
Euspira	E. rectilabrum	Bowman County, North Dakota.	Probably from the Baculites reesidei Zone.	4 fairly complete shells.		
Pyrifuses	P. sp.	Bowman County, North Dakota.		1 weathered external mold.		
Striaticostatum?	S.? sp.	Bowman County, North Dakota.	Baculites reesidei Zone.	One specimen.		
Turritella	T. macnaryensis?	Bowman County, North Dakota.	Probably from the Baculites reesidei Zone.	2 specimens.		

==== Scaphopods ====
Scaphopods reported from the Pierre Shale Formation
Genus	Species	Location	Stratigraphic position	Material	Notes	Images
Dentalium	D. gracile	Bowman County, North Dakota.	"Probably from the Baculites reesidei Zone".	"3 nearly complete specimens & numerous fragments".		
