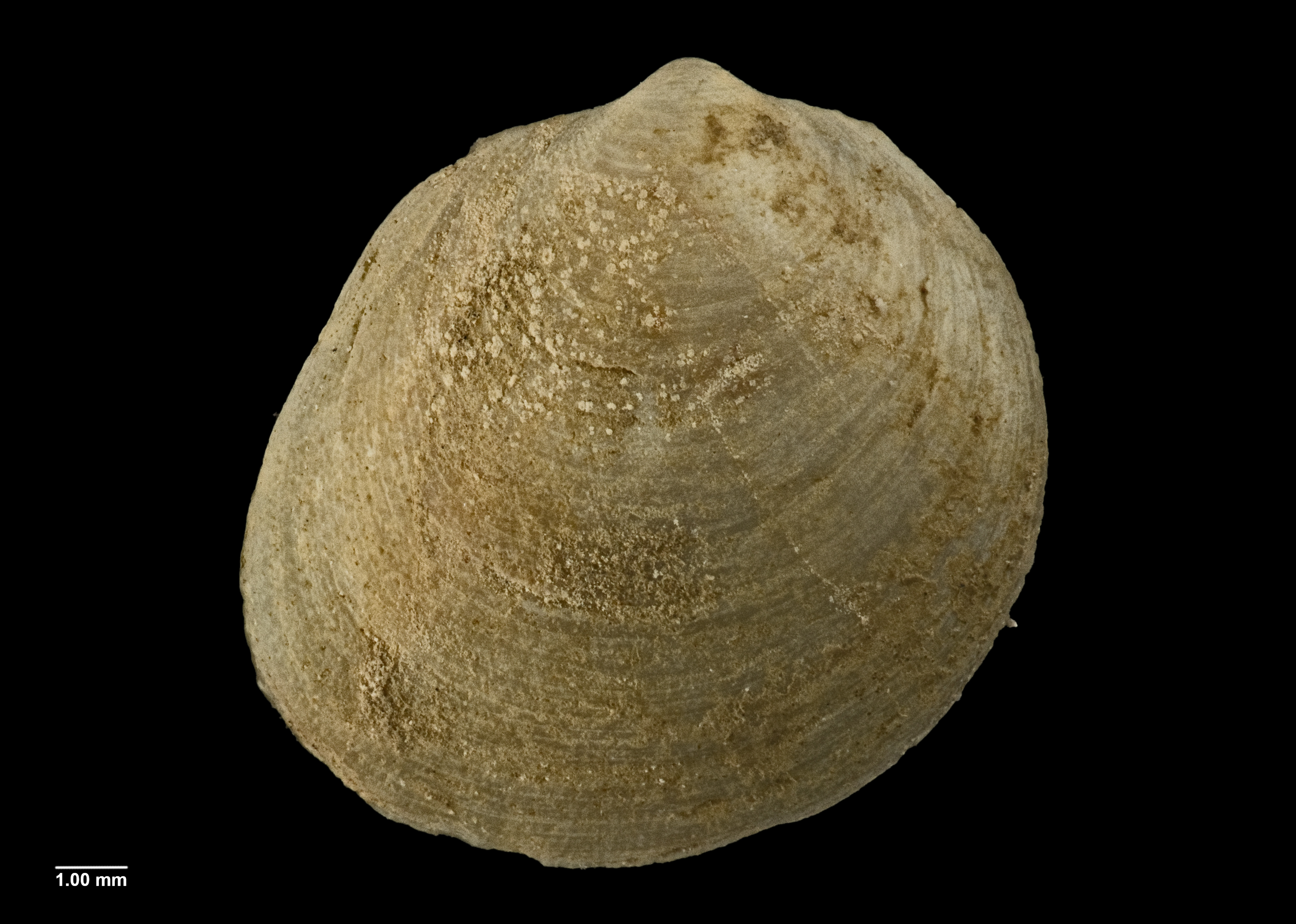
- Holotype from Auckland War Memorial Museum

Scientific classification
- Kingdom: Animalia
- Phylum: Mollusca
- Class: Bivalvia
- Order: Arcida
- Family: Limopsidae
- Genus: Limopsis
- Species: †L. marwicki

Binomial name
- †Limopsis marwicki A. W. B. Powell, 1938

= Limopsis marwicki =

Limopsis marwicki Temporal range: 2.40 Ma

Extinct species of gastropod

Limopsis marwicki is an extinct species of marine bivalve mollusc in the family Limopsidae. Fossils of the species date to the Pleistocene in New Zealand.

== Description ==
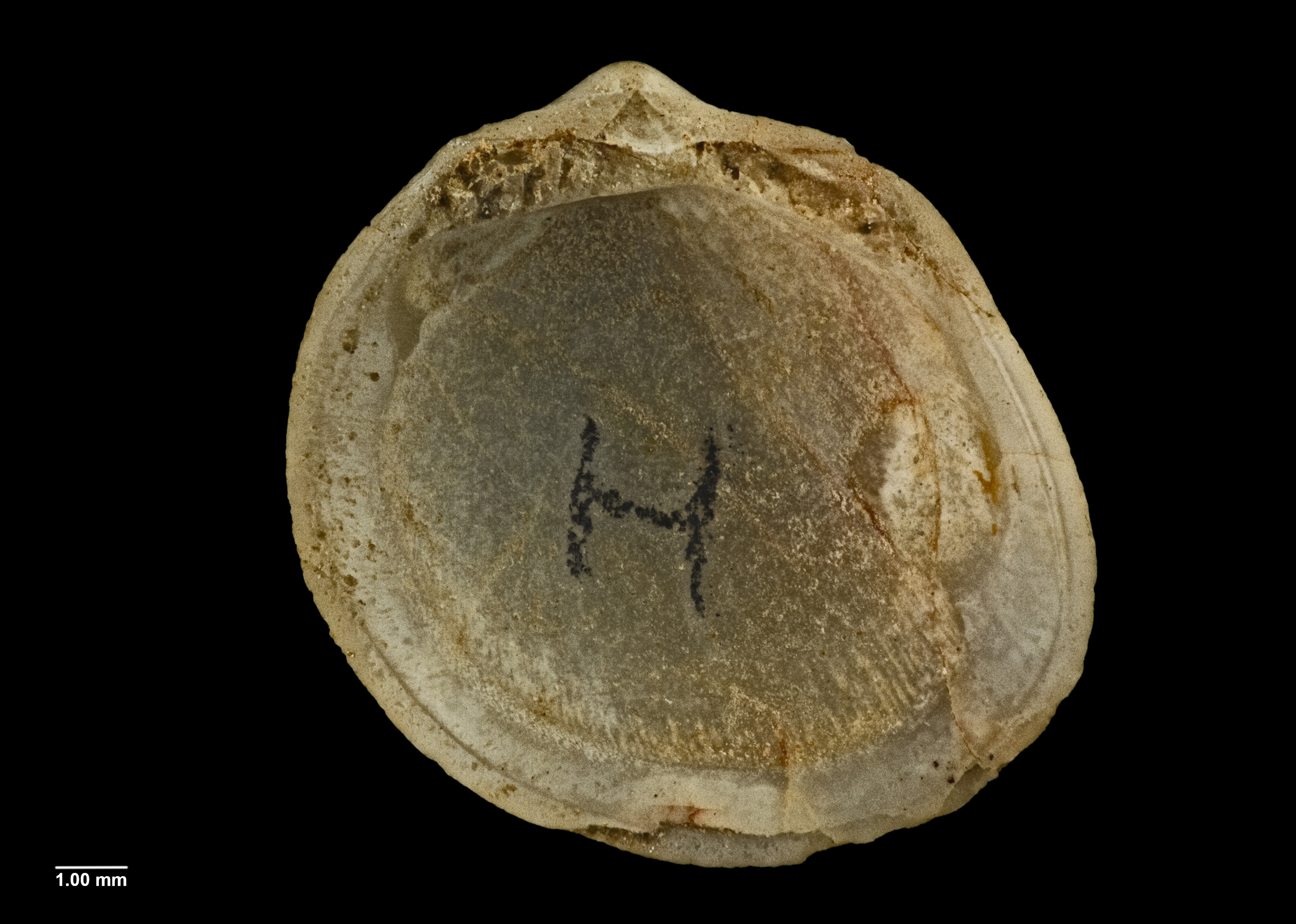
Reverse view of holotype

In the original description, Powell described the species as follows:

Shell small, obliquely-oval, moderately inflated, beaks low. Sculpture weak, consisting of concentric linear grooves which cut up the surface into flat, closely spaced interspaces, and are crossed by weak radials on and near to the anterior and posterior areas. These radials are produced into microscopic scale-like projections where they cross the lower edge of each interspace. Hinge typical. In young specimens the hinge teeth extend right across the hinge plate, but in the adults the teeth in the middle part of the hinge are sub-obsolete. The fully developed teeth number six on each extremity of the hinge. Ligamental area rather narrowly triangular. Valve margins smooth and bevelled.

The holotype of the species has a height of 11.5 mm (0.45 in), length of 11 mm (0.43 in) and a single valve thickness of 3.25 mm (0.128 in). It can be differentiated from L. invalida due to L. invalida being narrower, thinner-shelled, smaller, more inflated and having a smooth marginal flange.

== Taxonomy ==
The species was first described by A.W.B. Powell in 1938, who named the species after New Zealand paleontologist John Marwick. The species likely represents a Limopsis lineage that has become extinct, due to differences seen between it and extant New Zealand members of Limopsis. The holotype was collected at a date prior to 1939 by A. W. B. Powell, from lighthouse reef, Castlepoint, Wairarapa, New Zealand, and is held by the Auckland War Memorial Museum.

== Distribution ==
This extinct marine species occurs in Pleistocene (Nukumaruan stage) of New Zealand, dating to 2.40 million years before the present, including the Castlepoint Formation.
