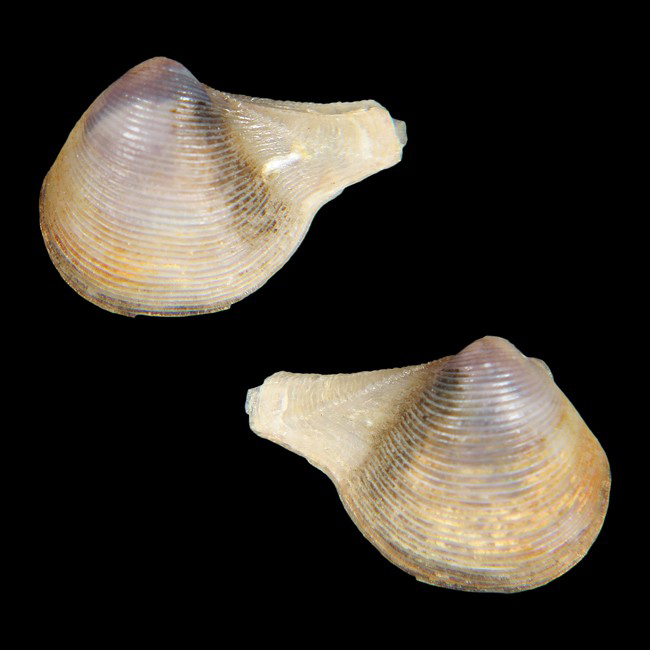

Scientific classification
- Kingdom: Animalia
- Phylum: Mollusca
- Class: Bivalvia
- Family: Cuspidariidae
- Genus: Cuspidaria
- Species: C. tomricei

Binomial name
- Cuspidaria tomricei Poppe & Tagaro, 2016

= Cuspidaria tomricei =

Species of bivalve

Cuspidaria tomricei is a species of marine bivalve mollusc in the family Cuspidariidae.

== Original description ==
- Poppe G.T. & Tagaro S. (2016). New marine mollusks from the central Philippines in the families Aclididae, Chilodontidae, Cuspidariidae, Nuculanidae, Nystiellidae, Seraphsidae and Vanikoridae. Visaya. 4(5): 83-103.

page(s): 84.
