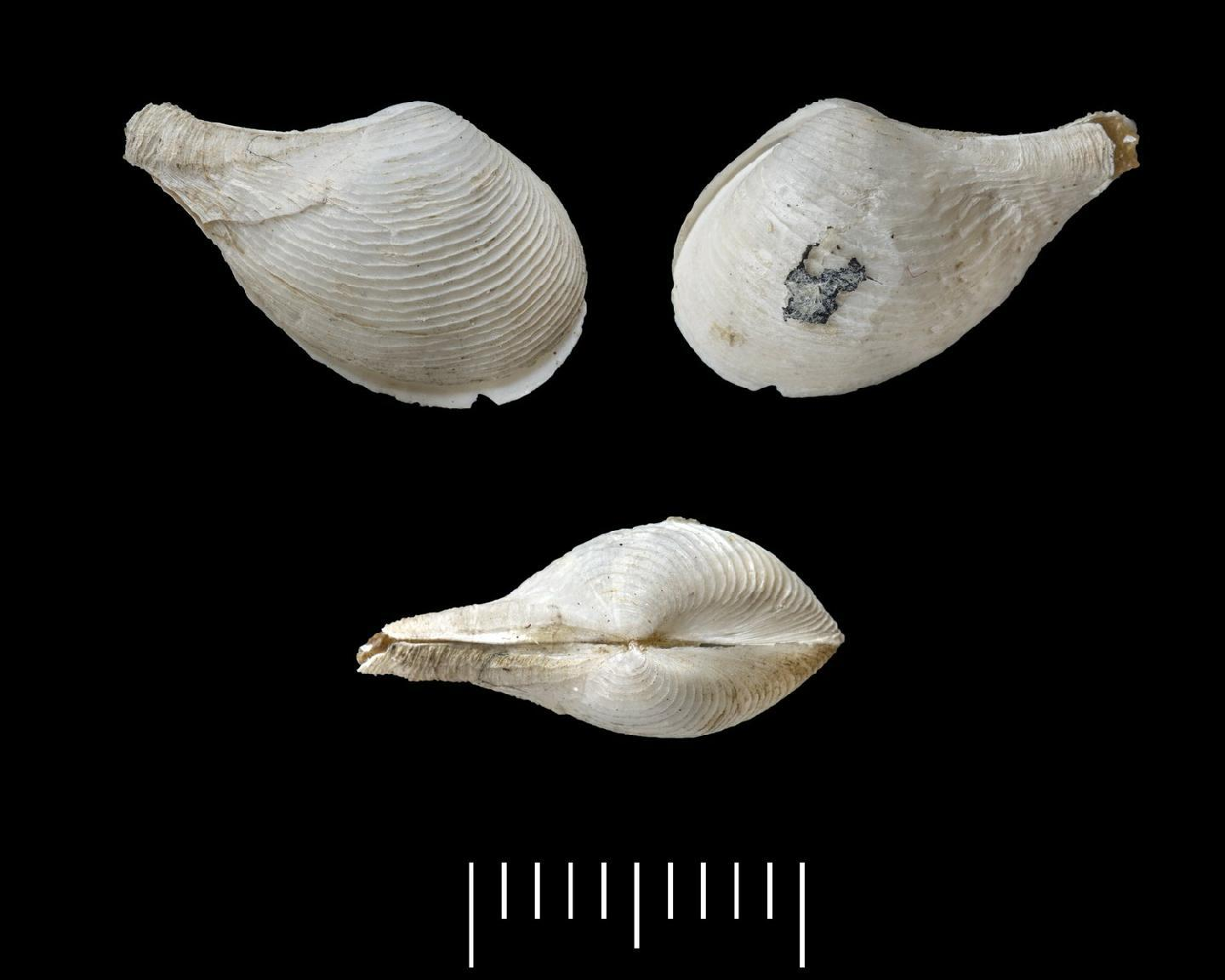

Scientific classification
- Domain: Eukaryota
- Kingdom: Animalia
- Phylum: Mollusca
- Class: Bivalvia
- Superfamily: Cuspidarioidea
- Family: Cuspidariidae
- Genus: Cuspidaria
- Species: C. elegans

Binomial name
- Cuspidaria elegans (Hinds, 1843)

Synonyms
- Neaera elegans Hinds, 1843; Neaera moluccana Adams & Reeve, 1850

= Cuspidaria elegans =

Species of bivalve

Cuspidaria elegans is a species of bivalves in the family Cuspidariidae. It is found at 100–200 m (330–660 ft) in sand and mud. It is reported in Indonesia, the Philippines, the South China Sea (the Xisha Islands), Taiwan and the Beibu Gulf. Its Chinese common name is 华美杓蛤, which translates as "colorful scoop clam".
