= Denver Basin =

Geologic structural basin in the U.S.

Coordinates: 40°N 105°W

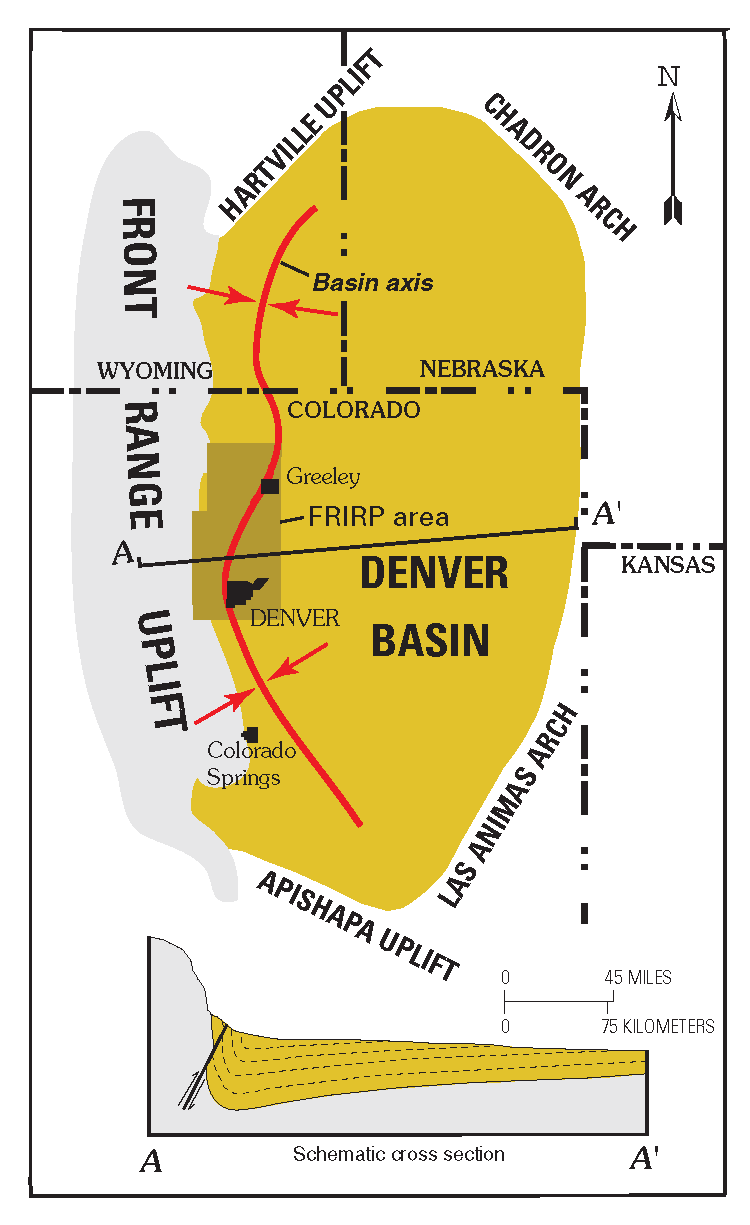
Location of the Denver Basin

The Denver Basin, variously referred to as the Julesburg Basin, Denver-Julesburg Basin (after Julesburg, Colorado), or the D-J Basin, is a geologic structural basin centered in eastern Colorado in the United States, but extending into southeast Wyoming, western Nebraska, and western Kansas. It underlies the Denver-Aurora Metropolitan Area on the eastern side of the Rocky Mountains.

== Geology ==
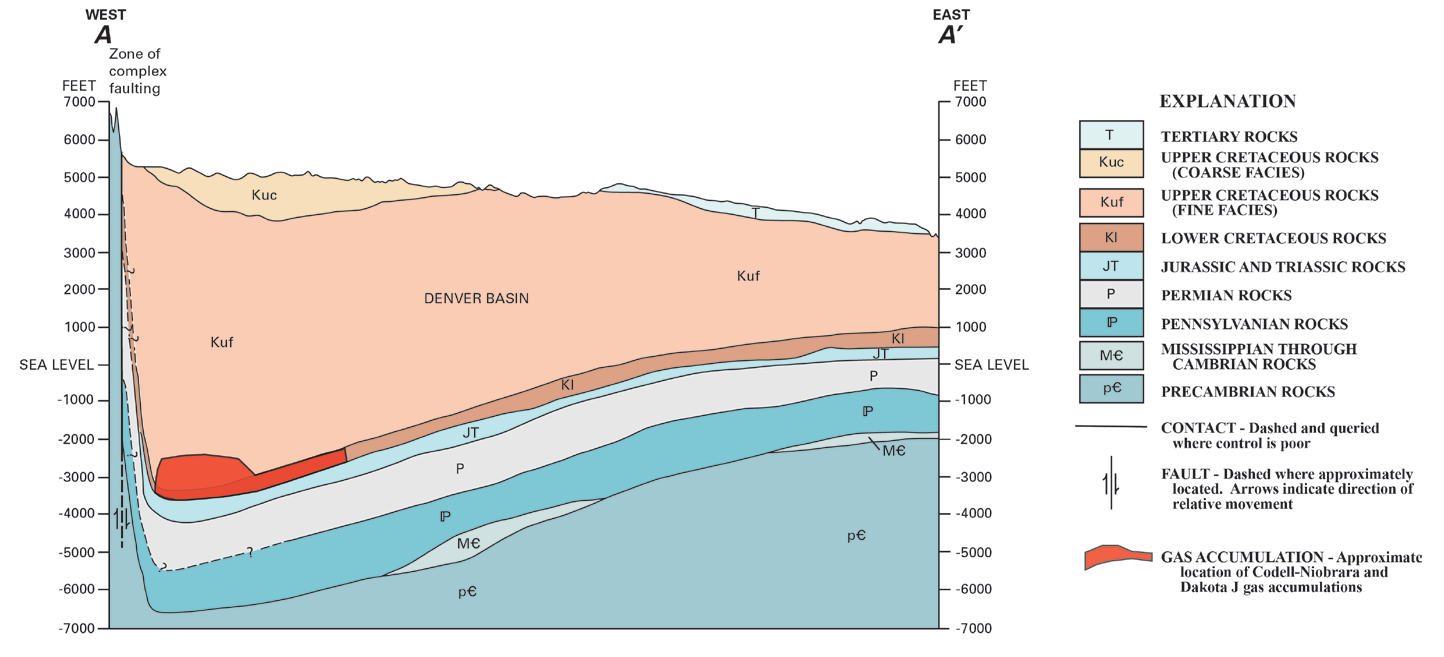
East-West cross-section through the Denver Basin

The basin consists of a large asymmetric syncline of Paleozoic, Mesozoic, and Cenozoic sedimentary rock layers, trending north to south along the east side of the Front Range from the vicinity of Pueblo northward into Wyoming. The basin is deepest near Denver, where it reaches a depth of approximately 13,000 ft (3900 m) below the surface. The basin is strongly asymmetric: the Dakota Sandstone outcrops in a "hog-back" ridge near Morrison a few miles west of Denver, reaches its maximum depth beneath Denver, then ascends very gradually to its eastern outcrop in central Kansas. The Dakota hogback exposes Dakota Sandstone overlying and protecting the Morrison Formation beneath and to the west. Between Golden and Morrison, the Dakota hogback is called Dinosaur Ridge and is the site of a dinosaur trackway and dinosaur fossils exposed in the outcrop that are part of a Colorado State Natural Area and Geological Points of Interest. The Lyons and Lykins formations outcrop in a smaller hogback. Farther west, the Fountain Formation outcrops as flatirons and forms the namesake of the Red Rocks Park and Amphitheatre. Here, against the eastern edge of the Rocky Mountain Front range, the Fountain Formation is in nonconformable contact with the Precambrian crystalline rock of the Idaho Springs Formation.

The basin started forming as early as 300 million years ago, during the Colorado orogeny that created the Ancestral Rockies. Rocks formed during this time include the Fountain Formation, which is most prominently visible at Red Rocks and the Boulder Flatirons.

The present basin was within the Cretaceous Interior Seaway, which deposited a thick Cretaceous section in the basin. Dinosaur fossils from the Maastrichtian have been unearthed in the Denver Basin.

The basin was most likely further deepened in Paleogene time, between 66 and 45 million years ago, during the Laramide orogeny that created the modern Colorado Rockies. In particular, the uplifting of the Rockies in the Front Range caused the crust near Denver to buckle downward on the eastern side, deepening the basin. The basin later became filled with sediment eroded from the Rockies. The Front Range peaks rise approximately 22,000 ft (6600 m) from the floor of the basin under Denver.

The deep part of the basin near Denver became filled with Paleogene sandstone and conglomerate, a layer now called the Denver Formation. In the regions to the north and south of Denver, however, stream erosion removed the Paleogene layers, revealing the underlying Cretaceous Pierre Shale.

== Natural resources ==
=== Petroleum ===
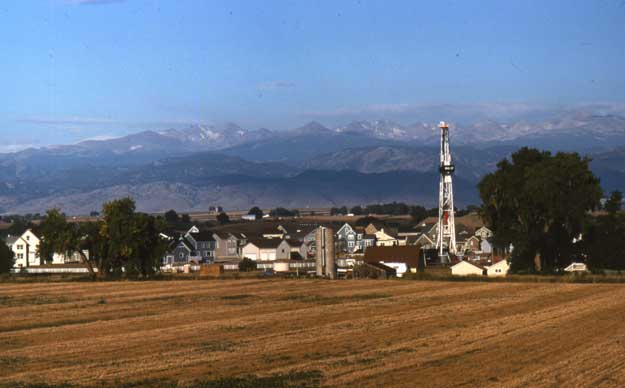
Drilling in the Wattenberg Gas Field north of Denver.

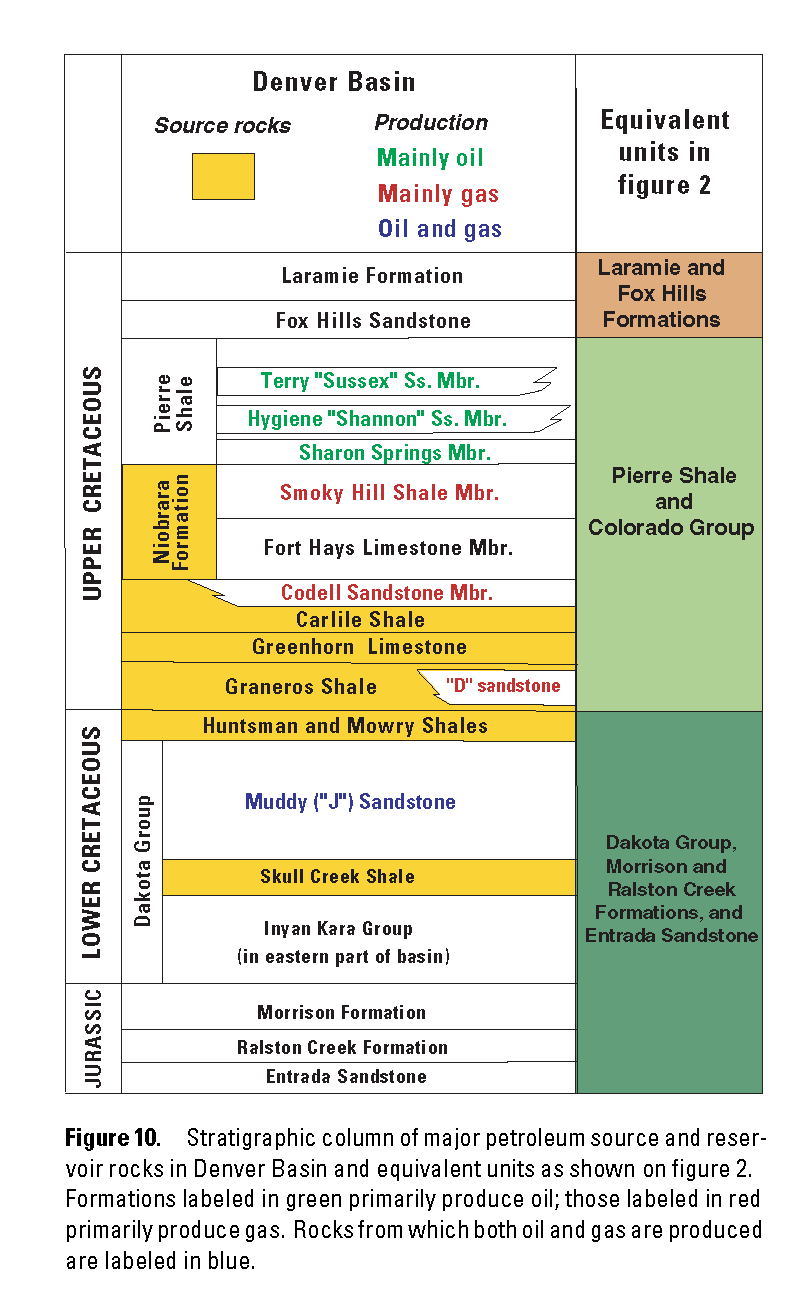
Oil and gas-producing formations in the Denver Basin

The basin itself forms a petroleum province. Oil and gas have been produced from the Denver Basin since the discovery in 1901 of oil in fractured Pierre Shale at the McKenzie Well, part of the Boulder oil field in Boulder County.

The great majority of Denver Basin oil and gas fields produce from Cretaceous sandstones, although the Permian Lyons Sandstone is also a producer. Oil has also been produced from Permian sandstones and dolomites and Pennsylvanian limestones in the Nebraska part of the basin.

The Wattenberg Gas Field, one of the largest natural gas deposits in the United States, is a basin-centered gas field just north of the Denver metropolitan area. The field has produced more than 4.0 trillion cubic feet (TCF) of natural gas from the J Sandstone, Codell Sandstone, Niobrara Formation, and the Hygiene Sandstone, and Terry Sandstone members of the Pierre Shale, (all Cretaceous). In 2007, the field made 11 million barrels of oil and 170 billion cubic feet (BCF) of gas from more than 14,000 wells, making it the 9th largest source of natural gas in the United States.

Biogenic natural gas is recovered from shallow gas fields (less than 3,000 feet) of the Niobrara Formation in Yuma, Phillips, and Washington counties of northeastern Colorado and Cheyenne and Sherman counties of northwestern Kansas. To date, 2,900 wells have produced 470 billion cubic feet (1.3×10^{10} m^{3}) of gas. Drilling is currently very active, and the play is expanding into Perkins, Chase, and Dundy counties, Nebraska.

=== Coal ===
Bituminous coal has been mined by underground methods in the Denver Basin, at Superior and Louisville, Colorado and other locations along the western edge of the basin. The coal comes from the Cretaceous Laramie Formation. Mining began in the late 1850s and stopped in 1979.

Large lignite deposits are present in the Paleocene Denver Formation in the central part of the basin, in a north-south belt east of Denver and Colorado Springs, in Adams, Arapahoe, Elbert, and El Paso counties. Some mining was done from about 1886 to 1940, but was reportedly minor.

=== Groundwater ===
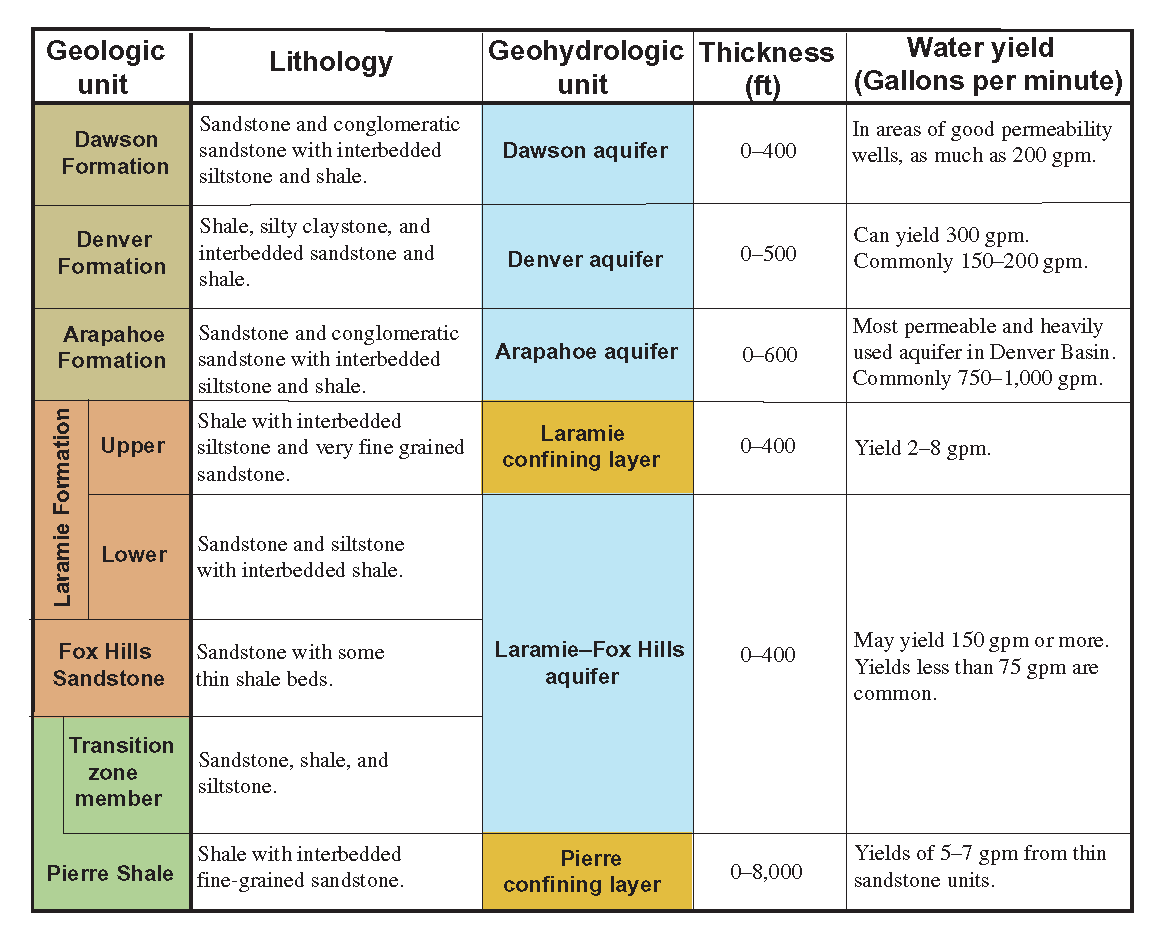
Aquifers in the Denver Basin (USGS)

The Denver Basin aquifer system consists of a layered sequence of four aquifers in beds of permeable conglomerate, sandstone, and siltstone. Layers of relatively impermeable shale separate the aquifers and impede the vertical movement of ground water between the aquifers. The northern part of this aquifer system underlies the surficial aquifer of the South Platte River. Although the Denver Basin aquifer system and the surficial aquifer are hydraulically connected in part of this area, they primarily function as separate aquifer systems which serve as important sources of water supply in the region. Denver and its suburbs such as the communities in Douglas County draw ground water from the aquifers in the Denver Basin. There is recharge of about 40,000 acre-feet per year from the broken land to the west of the basin and withdrawals of about 10 times as much. Ground water levels have dropped in the aquifers especially near population centers which draw on the aquifers for water.

=== Cement, construction aggregate and dimension stone ===
Raw materials are mined from the Niobrara Formation and Pierre Shale and made into cement at the Cemex plant near Lyons, Colorado.

Sand and gravel for construction are a major mineral resource in the Denver Basin.

The Lyons Formation provides flagstone from quarries in Boulder and Larimer counties, along the western edge of the basin.

=== Gold ===
Small amounts of gold have been mined from sands and gravels in the Denver area since the Pikes Peak Gold Rush of 1858. Some sand and gravel pits still recover gold in their washing operations.

=== Uranium ===
A small amount of uranium ore has been mined from the Dakota Sandstone at Morrison, Colorado, where the sandstone is impregnated with petroleum. Uranium is known to exist in roll-front type deposits in the Denver Basin, but the basin has never been a major source of uranium.

== External links and further reading ==
- Emmons, Samuel Franklin, 1841-1911; Cross, Whitman, 1854-1949; Eldridge, George Homans, 1854-1905, Geology of the Denver basin in Colorado (1896) Washington D.C, Government Printing Office
- Kansas Geological Survey: Geological Overview of the Niobrara Chalk Natural Gas Play
- 2002 USGS Assessment of Oil and Gas Resource Potential of the Denver Basin Petroleum Province of Colorado, Kansas, Nebraska, South Dakota, and Wyoming
- Colorado Geological Survey: Sedimentary Rock Aquifers: Denver Basin
