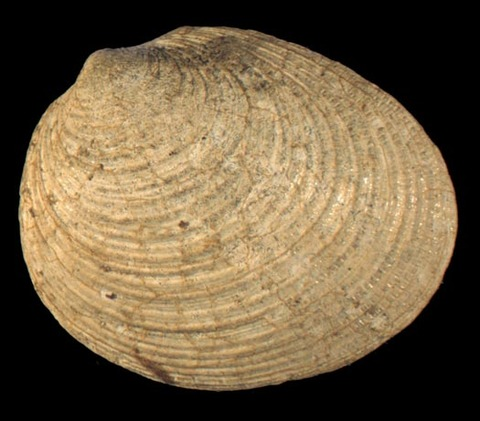

Scientific classification
- Kingdom: Animalia
- Phylum: Mollusca
- Class: Bivalvia
- Order: Arcida
- Family: Limopsidae
- Genus: Limopsis
- Species: L. sulcata

Binomial name
- Limopsis sulcata Verrill & Bush, 1898

= Limopsis sulcata =

Species of bivalve

Limopsis sulcata, common name the Sulcate limopsis, is a species of very small clam, a marine bivalve mollusk in the family Limopsidae. This species occurs along the Atlantic coast of North America from Massachusetts to the West Indies.
