= Boulder Oil Field =

Oil field, in the area of Boulder, Colorado, USA

Coordinates: 40.08°N 105.24°W

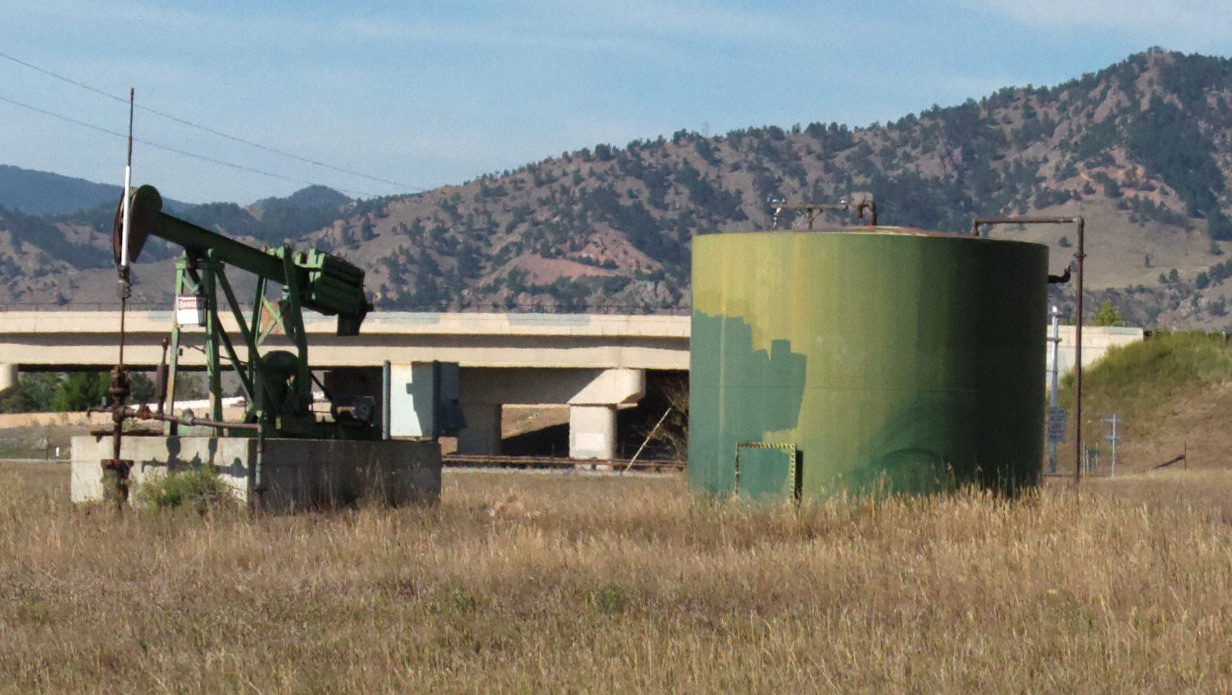
The McKenzie Well, still standing, is now plugged

The Boulder Oil Field was an oil field, in the area of Boulder, Colorado.

== Some history ==
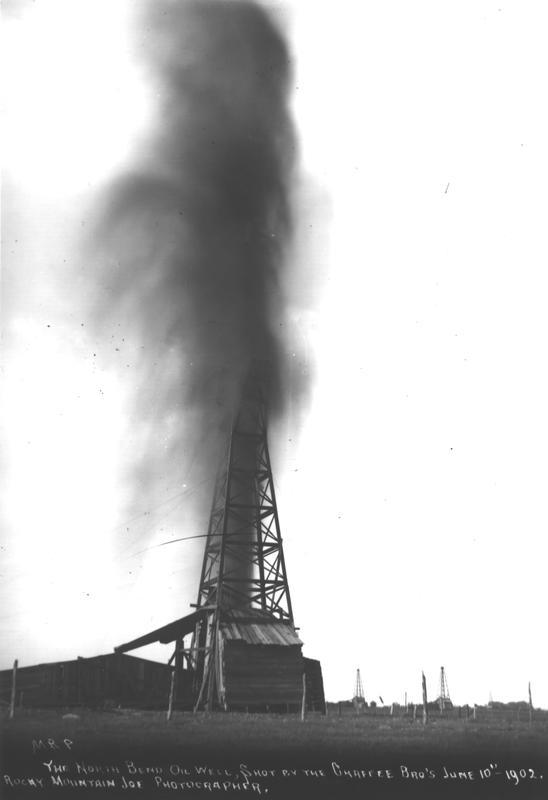
Boulder Oil Field. Views of oil derricks, one of which is gushing. Photo taken by Joseph Bevier Sturtevant, a.k.a. "Rocky Mountain Joe," June 10, 1902

Ute Indians were the first to discover oil, in Colorado.

The McKenzie Well still stands, near Boulder, and Isaac Canfield found it in 1901, by dowsing, first producing oil, on February 5, 1902. The McKenzie Well was found, on the ranch or farm, of Neil McKenzie. It is highly unusual, extraordinary, that the original site of the discovery of Boulder Oil Field remained the last producing oil well.

Of note, before the McKenzie Well was found, Florence oil driller Canfield noticed Boulder's topographic features resembled those of Florence; in Boulder area there were oil seeps, odors. The McKenzie Well was the first oil well sunk in what is now a vast oil and gas producing area, the Denver-Julesburg basin.

In Fremont County, Colorado, the Florence Oil Field was the first oil field west of the Mississippi River. From 1901, the Boulder Oil Field became the second, and, the Boulder Oil Field was discovered the same year as Spindletop, in Texas.

Locally, close to 200 oil wells have been drilled in Boulder, but barely a trace remains. The area produced about 800,000 barrels of oil, from Cretaceous Pierre Shale, and the oil field's maximum production was in 1909, with 85,000 barrels of oil.

== See also ==
- Denver Basin
- Green River Formation
- Niobrara Formation
- Piceance Basin
- Wattenberg Gas Field
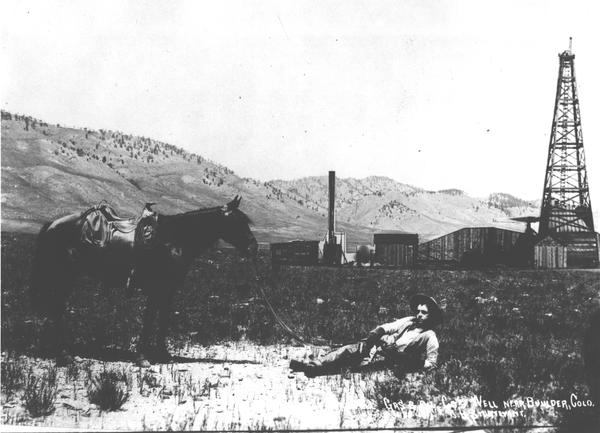
Boulder oil fields, gas and oil company well, 1910.

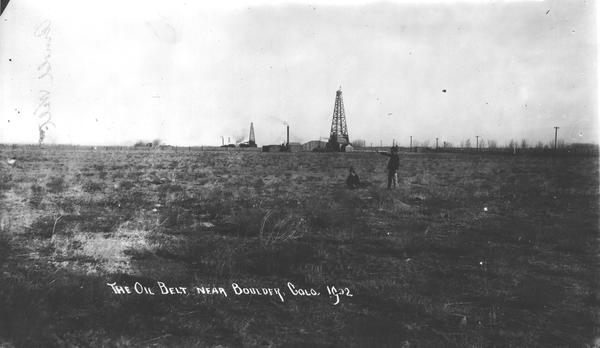
Boulder Oil Field, 1902

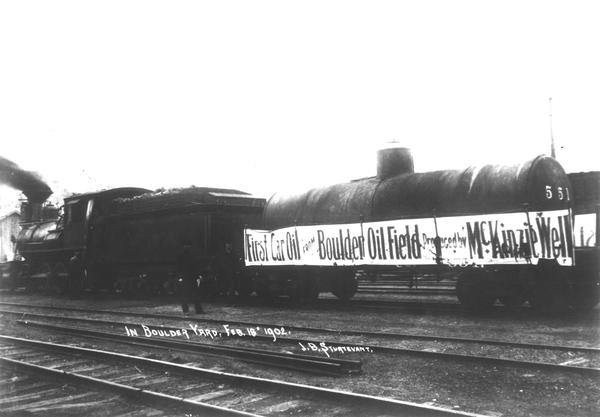
Oil from the McKenzie Well, misspelled McKinzie, 1902

== External links and references ==
- One link
- History, in Boulder, Colorado
- A photo
