= Belemnitella bulbosa =

Belemnitella bulbosa Temporal range: Late Cretaceous

Scientific classification
- Domain: Eukaryota
- Kingdom: Animalia
- Phylum: Mollusca
- Class: Cephalopoda
- Order: †Belemnitida
- Family: †Belemnitellidae
- Genus: †Belemnitella
- Species: †B. bulbosa

Binomial name
- †Belemnitella bulbosa Meek & Hayden, 1856

Extinct species of mollusc

Belemnitella bulbosa is a species of belemnite from the Late Cretaceous of North America. It is known only from two localities - the Pierre Shale and Fox Hills Formations. B. bulbosa had a slender somewhat cylindrical rostrum (guard) with a slightly expanded front opening. Like other members of the genus Belemnitella, it had a dorsal ridge on the rostrum. The phragmocone is about the same size or slightly longer than the rostrum and has an oval cross-section.
