= McKenzie Well =

- U.S. National Register of Historic Places
- Colorado State Register of Historic Properties
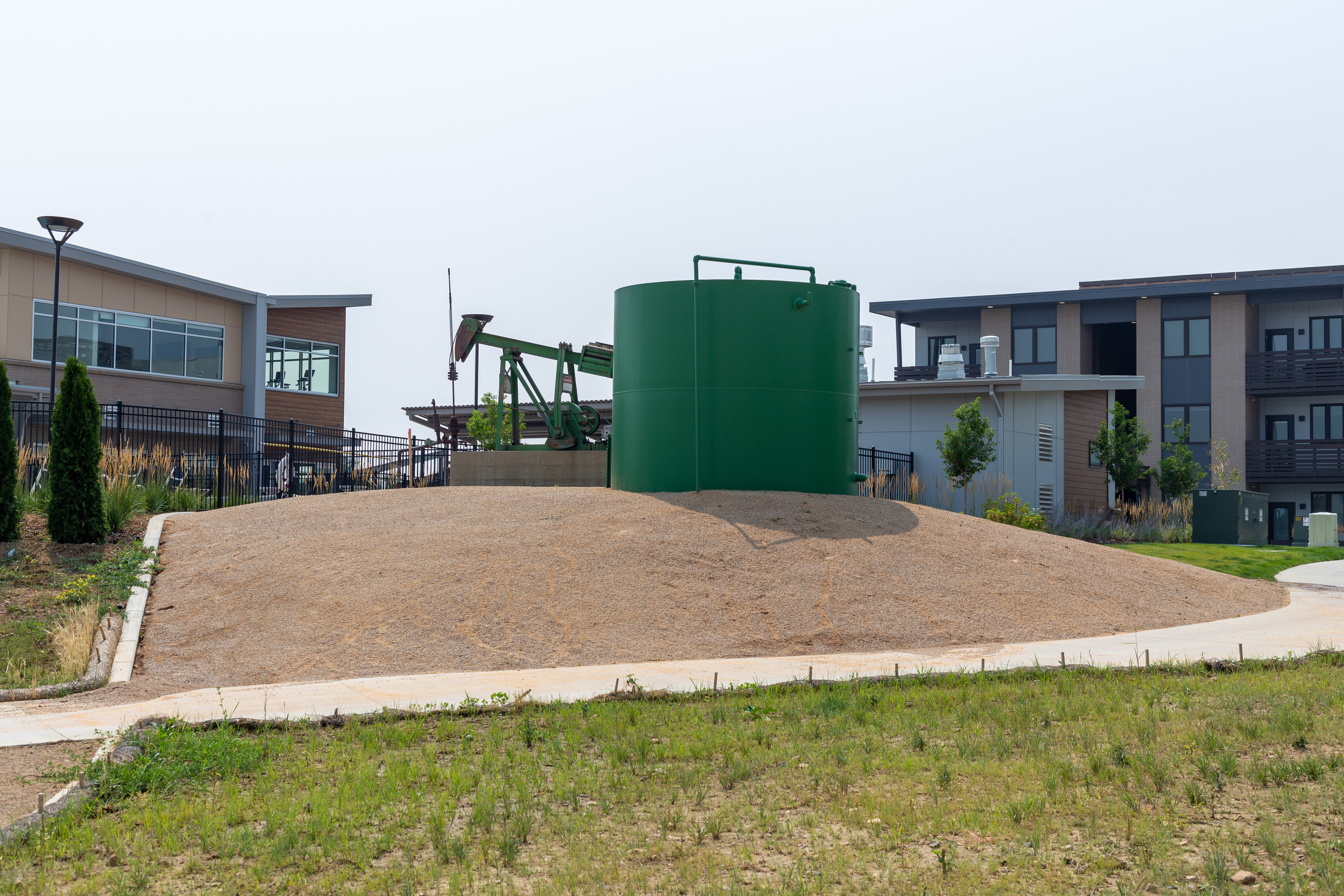
- The McKenzie Well site with defunct equipment.

- Location within Colorado Location within the United States
- Location: Near Independence Rd. and CO 119, Boulder, Colorado
- Coordinates: 40°2′36″N 105°14′27″W
- Area: 0.4 acres (0.16 ha)
- Built: 1901
- NRHP reference No.: 04001553
- CSRHP No.: 5BL.418
- Added to NRHP: January 26, 2005

The McKenzie Well (also known as McKenzie #1) is an oil well site in Boulder, Colorado. The Boulder Oil Field was discovered on this site in 1901, making it the oldest oil-producing site in the entire Denver Basin, and one of the oldest in the western United States. The first producing well on the site was drilled in 1902. Peak production at 85,000 barrels was reached in 1909.

A modern well (built in the 1960s) sits on the site of the original discovery; nothing remains of the original machinery. The well was plugged in 2007.

The McKenzie Well site is listed on the National Register of Historic Places and the Colorado State Register of Historic Properties.
