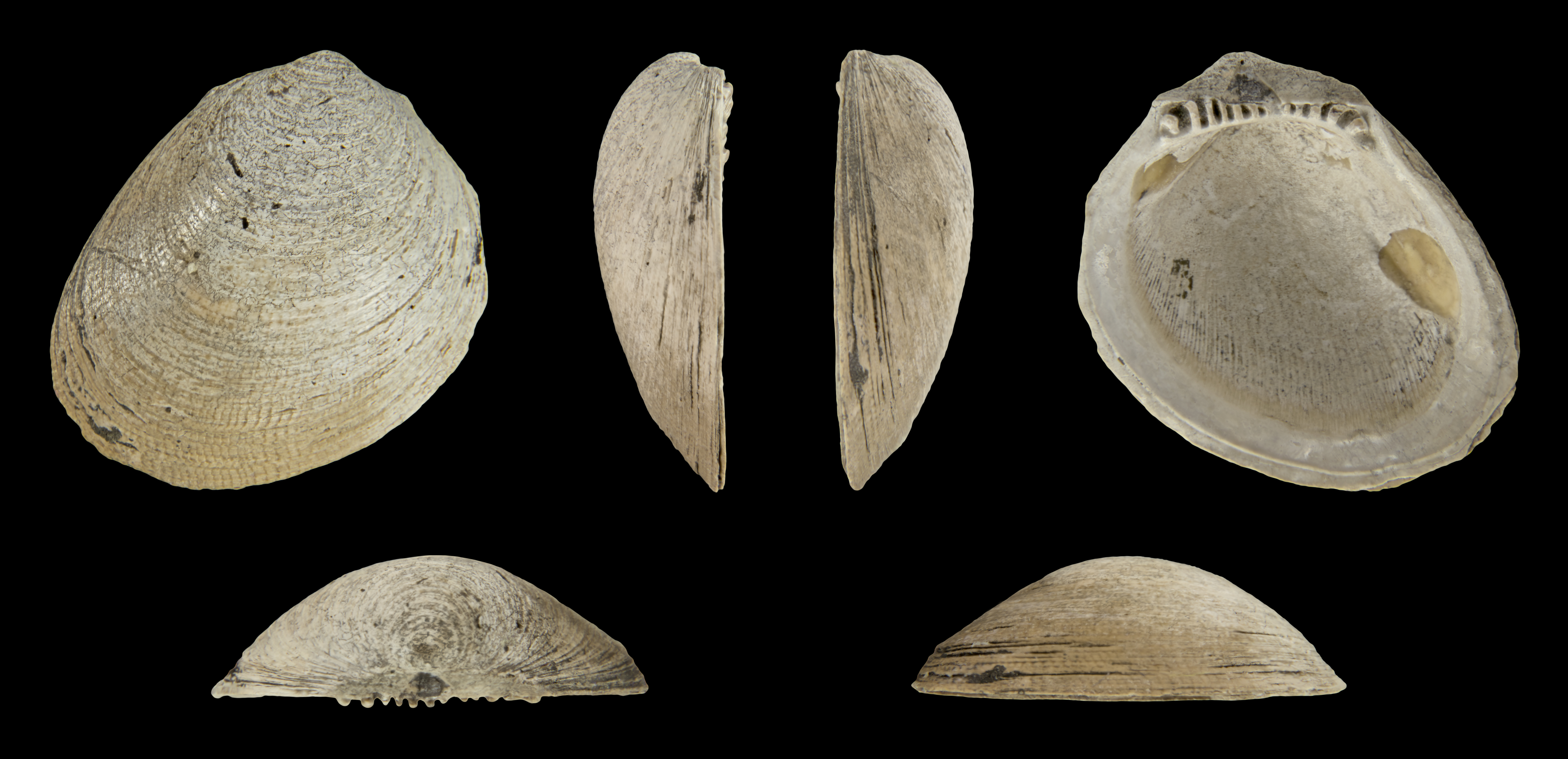
- Limopsis aurita

Scientific classification
- Kingdom: Animalia
- Phylum: Mollusca
- Class: Bivalvia
- Order: Arcida
- Family: Limopsidae
- Genus: Limopsis; Sasso, 1827

Type species
- Arca aurita Brocchi, 1814

Synonyms
- Axinea (Limopsis) Sasso, 1837; †Cnisma Mayer[-Eymar], 1868; Felicia Mabille & Rochebrune, 1889; Glycilima Iredale, 1931; Limopsis (Felicia) Mabille & Rochebrune, 1889; Limopsis (Glycilima) Iredale, 1931; Limopsis (Limopsis) Sasso, 1827; Limopsis (Limopsista) H. J. Finlay & Marwick, 1937; Limopsis (Loringella) Iredale, 1929; Limopsis (Oliveropsis) M. Huber, 2010; Limopsis (Pectunculina) A. d'Orbigny, 1844; Limopsis (Phrynelima) Iredale, 1929; Limopsis (Senectidens) Iredale, 1931; Limopsis (Versipella) Iredale, 1931; †Limopsista H. J. Finlay & Marwick, 1937; Loringella Iredale, 1929; Pectunculina A. d'Orbigny, 1844; †Pectunculus (Cnisma) Mayer[-Eymar], 1868; Phrynelima Iredale, 1929; Senectidens Iredale, 1931; Trigonocaelia Nyst & Galeotti, 1835; Trigonocelia Nyst & Galeotti, 1835; Trigonocoelia Nyst & Galeotti, 1835; Versipella Iredale, 1931

= Limopsis =

Limopsis Temporal range: Jurassic–Recent

Genus of molluscs

Limopsis is a genus of bivalves belonging to the family Limopsidae.

== Taxonomy ==
The genus was first described by Agostino Sasso in 1827.

== Distribution ==
The genus has cosmopolitan distribution. The earliest known fossils in the genus date to the Jurassic, and have been found in France, Germany, Hungary and the United Kingdom.

== Species ==
Species within the genus Limopsis include:

- †Limopsis adamsiana Yokoyama, 1920
- Limopsis agulhasensis Thiele, 1931
- Limopsis akutanica Dall, 1916
- Limopsis angusta Jeffreys, 1879
- †Limopsis anomala (Eichwald, 1830)
- †Limopsis antarctica Wilckens, 1910
- †Limopsis antarctominuta Stilwell, 2000
- †Limopsis aoteana (Vella, 1954)
- Limopsis aurita (Brocchi, 1814)
- Limopsis bassi E. A. Smith, 1885
- †Limopsis beaumariensis Chapman, 1911
- Limopsis belcheri (A. Adams & Reeve, 1850)
- Limopsis brazieri Angas, 1871
- †Limopsis butonensis Beets, 1942
- †Limopsis campa R. S. Allan, 1926
- †Limopsis carmanahensis B. L. Clark, 1925
- †Limopsis catenata Suter, 1917
- †Limopsis chapmani Singleton, 1932
- †Limopsis chitaniana Yokoyama, 1926
- †Limopsis cooki Marwick, 1931
- Limopsis crassula Habe, 1953
- Limopsis dalli E. Lamy, 1912
- Limopsis dannevigi (Iredale, 1931)
- Limopsis davidis Hedley, 1899
- Limopsis davinae Esteves, 1984
- †Limopsis dolomitica R. Casey, 1961
- Limopsis elachista Sturany, 1899
- Limopsis enderbyensis A. W. B. Powell, 1958
- Limopsis eucosmus Verco, 1907
- †Limopsis fenestrata (K. Martin, 1885)
- Limopsis forskalii A. Adams, 1863
- Limopsis forteradiata Cotton, 1930
- †Limopsis gisbornensis P. A. Maxwell, 1978
- †Limopsis granulata (Lamarck, 1805)
- Limopsis hirtella Mabille & Rochebrune, 1889
- †Limopsis hokkaidoensis Amano & Lutaenko, 2004
- Limopsis indica E. A. Smith, 1894
- †Limopsis indubia Berezovsky, 2015
- †Limopsis insolita (G. B. Sowerby I, 1846)
- Limopsis invalida Marwick, 1928
- Limopsis janeiroensis E. A. Smith, 1915
- Limopsis japonica A. Adams, 1863
- Limopsis jousseaumi (Mabille & Rochebrune, 1889)
- Limopsis knudseni Dell, 1990
- Limopsis kurilensis Scarlato, 1981
- †Limopsis lacunosa Berezovsky, 2015
- †Limopsis lamyi Koperberg, 1931
- †Limopsis lawsi L. C. King, 1933
- Limopsis lilliei E. A. Smith, 1915
- Limopsis loringi Angas, 1873
- †Limopsis ludbrookae Glibert & Van de Poel, 1973
- †Limopsis maccoyi Chapman, 1911
- Limopsis marionensis E. A. Smith, 1885
- †Limopsis marwicki A. W. B. Powell, 1938
- †Limopsis merklini Glibert & van de Poel, 1965
- †Limopsis microdon (Cossmann, 1905)
- †Limopsis minima (J. De C. Sowerby, 1824)
- †Limopsis monbergi Ravn, 1939
- †Limopsis morningtonensis Pritchard, 1901
- †Limopsis multiradiata Tate, 1886
- †Limopsis nuculata (Lamarck, 1805)
- †Limopsis obesa Ravn, 1933
- Limopsis obliqua A. Adams, 1863
- †Limopsis obscura Berezovsky, 2015
- Limopsis occidentalis Cotton, 1930
- Limopsis oliveri Amano & Lutaenko, 2004
- Limopsis onchodes Dall, 1927
- †Limopsis ovata (K. Martin, 1885)
- Limopsis paradoxa (Iredale, 1931)
- †Limopsis parma Marwick, 1929
- †Limopsis parva Harder, 1913
- †Limopsis parvicostata (P. A. Maxwell, 1992)
- Limopsis paucidentata Dall, 1886
- Limopsis penelevis Verco, 1907
- †Limopsis perobliqua (K. Martin, 1885)
- †Limopsis peteri Beu, 1969
- †Limopsis phacomorpha É. Vincent, 1930
- †Limopsis pretiosa Berezovsky, 2015
- Limopsis proceritas (Crozier, 1966)
- †Limopsis producta Finlay & McDowall, 1923
- †Limopsis propeinvalida Laws, 1939
- †Limopsis psimolis Anelli, Rocha-Campus, dos Santos, Perinotto & Quaglio, 2006
- †Limopsis quadrata Berezovsky, 2015
- †Limopsis quenstedti Karapunar, Werner, Fürsich & Nützel, 2020
- Limopsis radialis Dall, 1927
- †Limopsis rupestris Darragh, 1994
- Limopsis sansibarica Thiele, 1931
- †Limopsis satoi Amano & Lutaenko, 2004
- †Limopsis scalaris (J. De C. Sowerby, 1824)
- Limopsis scotiana Dell, 1964
- Limopsis siberutensis Thiele, 1931
- Limopsis soboles (Iredale, 1931)
- †Limopsis striata (A. Rouault, 1850)
- †Limopsis subgranulata A. d'Orbigny, 1850
- †Limopsis subscalaris A. d'Orbigny, 1852
- Limopsis sulcata A. E. Verrill & K. J. Bush, 1898
- Limopsis surinamensis P. G. Oliver & J. A. Allen, 1980
- Limopsis tajimae G. B. Sowerby III, 1914
- Limopsis tenella Jeffreys, 1876
- Limopsis tenisoni Tenison Woods, 1878
- Limopsis tenuis G. Seguenza, 1876
- †Limopsis thebaica P. Oppenheim, 1903
- †Limopsis turnbulli Beu, 2006
- Limopsis uwadokoi Oyama, 1951
- †Limopsis venusta (K. Martin, 1885)
- Limopsis vixornata Verco, 1907
- †Limopsis waihaoensis R. S. Allan, 1926
- Limopsis waikikia Dall, Bartsch & Rehder, 1938
- †Limopsis waisiuensis Beets, 1942
- †Limopsis werrikooensis Singleton, 1941
- †Limopsis zealandica F. W. Hutton, 1873
- †Limopsis zitteli Ihering, 1907
- Limopsis zonalis Dall, 1908
