= Cuspidaria (bivalve) =

Cuspidaria Temporal range: Eocene–Present

Scientific classification
- Domain: Eukaryota
- Kingdom: Animalia
- Phylum: Mollusca
- Class: Bivalvia
- Family: Cuspidariidae
- Genus: Cuspidaria; Nardo, 1840

Species
- See text

Synonyms
- Neaera Griffith & Pidgeon 1834

Genus of bivalves

Cuspidaria is a genus of bivalves in the family Cuspidariidae.

== Species ==
- Cuspidaria abbreviata (Forbes, 1843)
- Cuspidaria alternata (d'Orbigny, 1842)
- Cuspidaria apodema Dall, 1916
- Cuspidaria arctica (Sars, 1878)
- Cuspidaria arcuata Dall, 1881
- Cuspidaria atlantica
- Cuspidaria aupouria Dell, 1950
- Cuspidaria chilensis Dall, 1890
- Cuspidaria circinata Jeffreys, 1876
- Cuspidaria costellata (Deshayes, 1833)
- Cuspidaria cuspidata (Olivi, 1792)
- Cuspidaria elegans (Hinds, 1843)
- Cuspidaria exigua (Jeffreys, 1876)
- Cuspidaria fairchildi Suter, 1908
- Cuspidaria filatovae
- Cuspidaria formosa Verrill and Bush, 1893
- Cuspidaria fraterna Verrill and Bush, 1893
- Cuspidaria gigantea Verrill, 1884
- Cuspidaria glacialis (G. O. Sars, 1878)
- Cuspidaria jeffreysi (Dall, 1881)
- Cuspidaria jugosa (S. V. Wood, 1856)
- Cuspidaria kawamurai Kuroda, 1948
- Cuspidaria kyushuensis Okutani, 1962
- Cuspidaria media A. E. Verrill and Bush, 1898
- Cuspidaria microrhina Dall, 1886
- Cuspidaria morelandi Dell, 1956
- Cuspidaria morioria Dell, 1956
- Cuspidaria nobilis (Adams, 1864)
- Cuspidaria obesa (Loven, 1846)
- Cuspidaria parapodema Bernard, 1969
- Cuspidaria parkeri
- Cuspidaria parva
- Cuspidaria pellucida Stimpson, 1853
- Cuspidaria rostrata (Spengler, 1793)
- Cuspidaria subglacialis Dall, 1913
- Cuspidaria subtorta (Sars, 1878)
- Cuspidaria subtorte (Sars, 1878)
- Cuspidaria sulcifera (Jeffreys, 1882)
- Cuspidaria tomricei Poppe & Tagaro, 2016
- Cuspidaria trailli (Hutton, 1873)
- Cuspidaria tuhua Dell, 1962
- Cuspidaria turgida Verrill and Bush, 1898
- Cuspidaria undata Verrill, 1884
- Cuspidaria variola
- Cuspidaria ventricosa Verrill and Bush, 1898
- Cuspidaria vicdani Poppe & Tagaro, 2016
- Cuspidaria willetti Fleming, 1948
- Cuspidaria wollastoni E. A. Smith, 1885

Fossil species

- Cuspidaria inflata (Jeffreys, 1876) and Cuspidaria lamellosa Sars, 1878 from the London Clay, a marine geological formation of Ypresian (Lower Eocene Epoch, c. 56–49 Ma)
- Cuspidaria textorama Garvie 2013, from the Eocene of the Reklaw Formation in the United States
