= Tepee Buttes =

Mountain range in North Dakota, United States

Coordinates: 47.729°N 103.319°W

Tepee Buttes is a mountain range in McKenzie County, North Dakota, in the United States.

Tepee Buttes was so named on account of its outline being shaped like a tepee.
