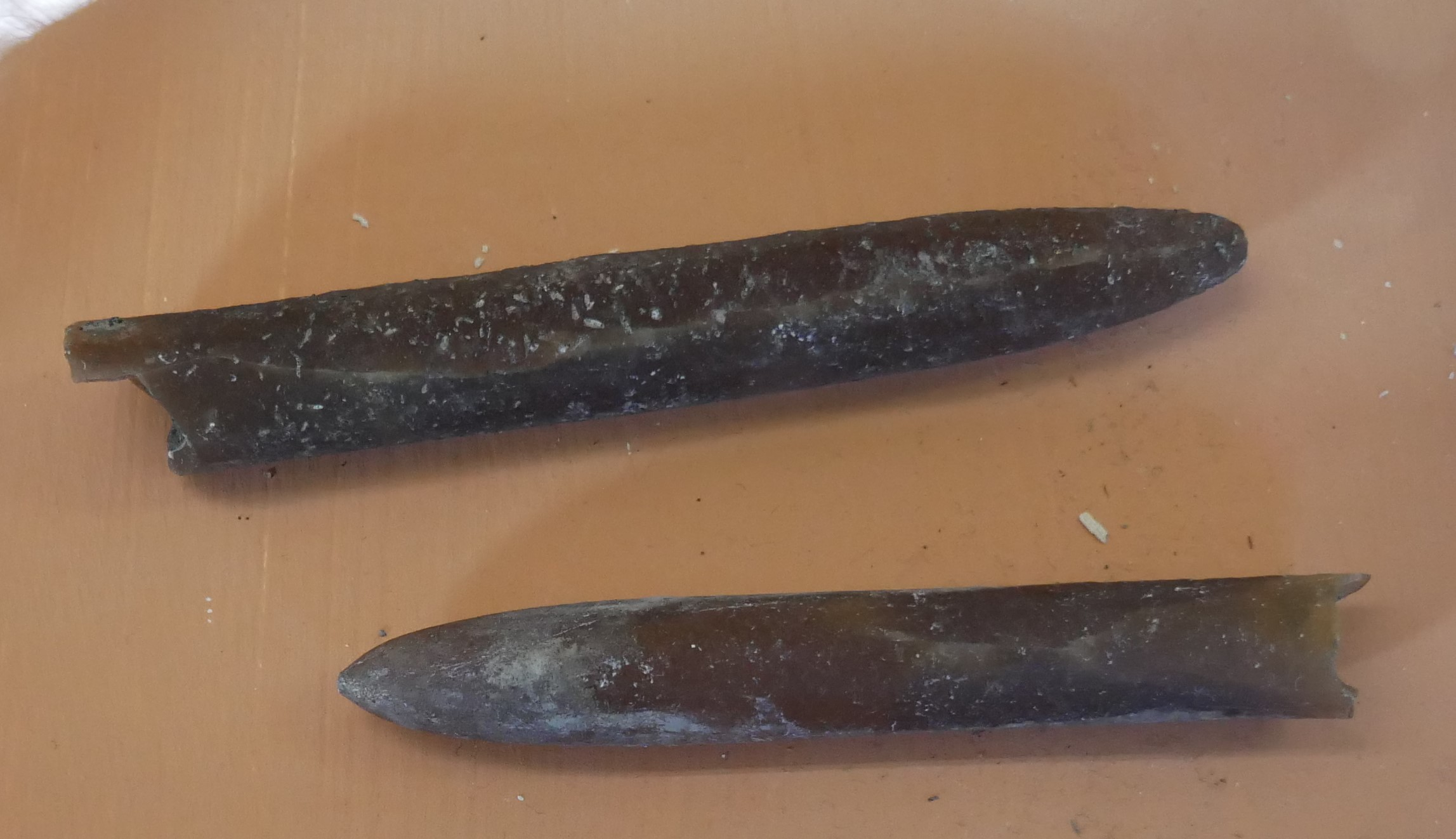
- Belemnitella americana

Scientific classification
- Domain: Eukaryota
- Kingdom: Animalia
- Phylum: Mollusca
- Class: Cephalopoda
- Order: †Belemnitida
- Family: †Belemnitellidae
- Genus: †Belemnitella d'Orbigny, 1840

Species
- Belemnitella bulbosa

= Belemnitella =

Belemnitella Temporal range: 84.9–66.043 Ma

Genus of cephalopods

Belemnitella is a genus of belemnite from the Late Cretaceous of Europe and North America.

== Genus ==
Belemnitella was a squidlike animal, probably related to the ancestors of modern squids and cuttlefish. The shell was internal. The rostrum or guard is found the most often and possesses a distinctive slit at its ventral surface and a ridge on the dorsal surface. The phragmocone (internal shell) has a small protoconch at its tip, and fit into the cavity and the guard. It also had septa and a ventral siphuncle (tube filled with living tissues running through chambers) within the phragmocone, projecting forward as a beak-like blade.

It had growth layers like tree rings, seen within the cavity of the organism and when the cone is sectioned. The cone was light-brown and glassy in appearance. It is distributed widely in North America. A specimen of a belemnoid had been found in Germany, clearly preserving 10 tentacles as carbon films, showing that belemnoids are similar to squids.

Belemnitella americana, is the source of the Pee Dee Belemnite, reference standard in research.
