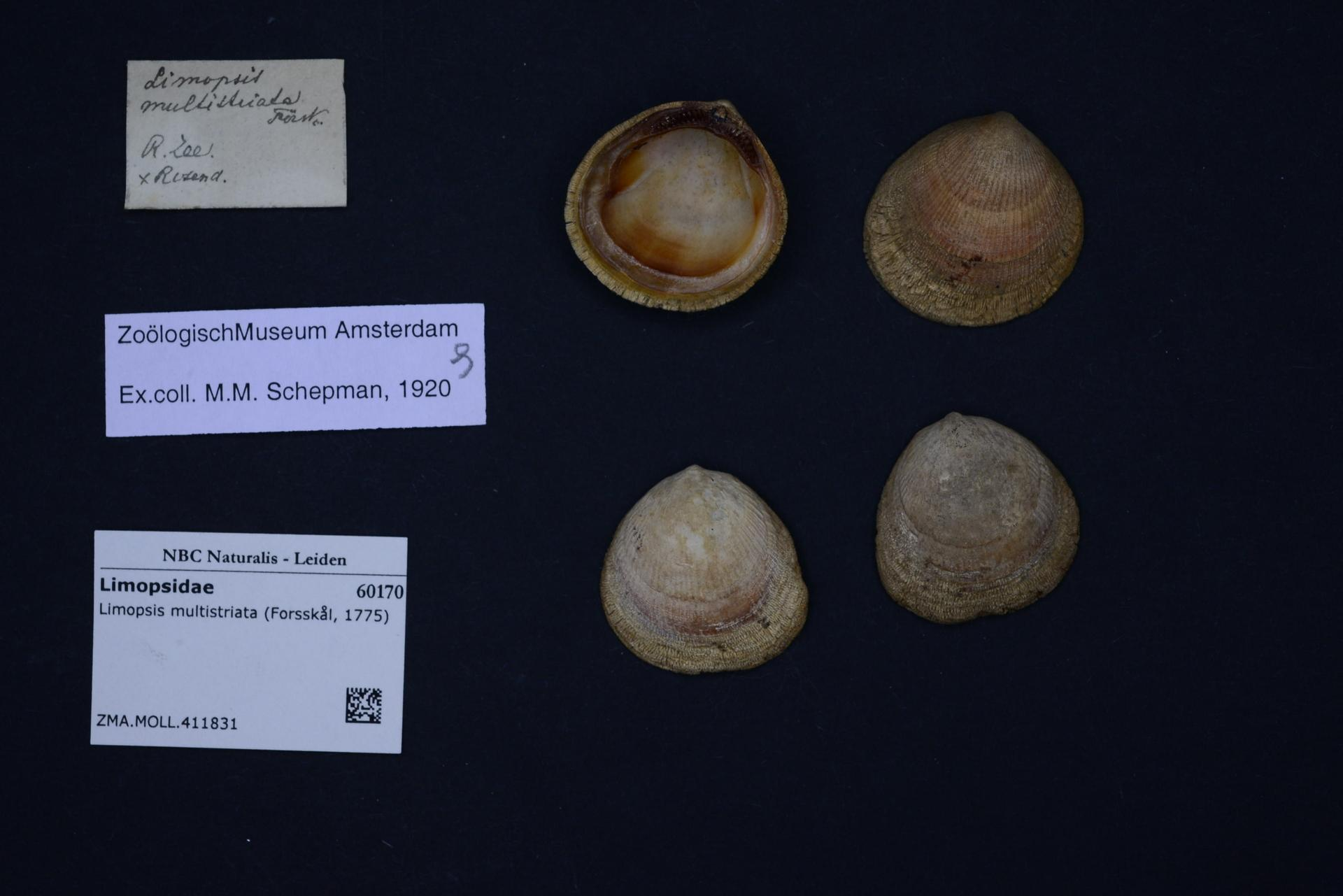
- Limopsis multistriata (Forsskål, 1775)

Scientific classification
- Kingdom: Animalia
- Phylum: Mollusca
- Class: Bivalvia
- Order: Arcida
- Superfamily: Limopsoidea
- Family: Limopsidae; Dall, 1895

Genera
- 7, See text

= Limopsidae =

Family of bivalves

Limopsidae is a family of bivalves, related to the ark clams and bittersweets. This family contains about thirty species in seven genera.

== Species ==
- Crenulilimopsis Kuroda & Habe, 1971
- Cnisma Mayer, 1868
- Empleconia Dall, 1908
- Limarca Tate, 1886
- Limopsis Sassi, 1827
  - Limopsis affinis A. E. Verrill, 1885
  - Limopsis antillensis Dall, 1881
  - Limopsis aurita
  - Limopsis cristata Jeffreys, 1876
  - Limopsis davidis Hedley, 1899 original species description, pages 564–565.
  - Limopsis davinae Esteves, 1984
  - Limopsis galathea
  - Limopsis hirtella Mabille & Rochebrune, 1889
  - Limopsis janeiroensis E. A. Smith, 1915
  - Limopsis marionensis E. A. Smith, 1885
  - Limopsis minuta (Philippi, 1836)
  - Limopsis multistrata
  - Limopsis onchodes Dall, 1927
  - Limopsis paucidentata Dall, 1886
  - Limopsis pelagica E. A. Smith, 1885
  - Limopsis perieri P. Fischer, 1869
  - Limopsis plana A. E. Verrill, 1885
  - Limopsis radialis Dall, 1927
  - Limopsis spicata Oliver & Allen, 1980
  - Limopsis sulcata A. E. Verrill & Bush, 1898
  - Limopsis surinamensis Oliver & Allen, 1980
  - Limopsis tenella Jeffreys, 1876
  - Limopsis zealandica Hutton, 1873
- Nipponolimopsis Habe, 1951
- Nucunella d'Orbigny, 1850

=== Limopsis ===
Species of the genus Limopsis are among the few suspension feeding deep-sea bivalves, and are absent from the continental shelf. They are relatively small, byssate (i.e. attached to the sea floor by strong threads, or byssus), and, while the viscera are reduced, there is a comparatively thick shell. Differences between species are usually defined by minor differences in gill and palp structure. The eggs are relatively few and of a size which suggests that the planktonic larvae do not feed.
