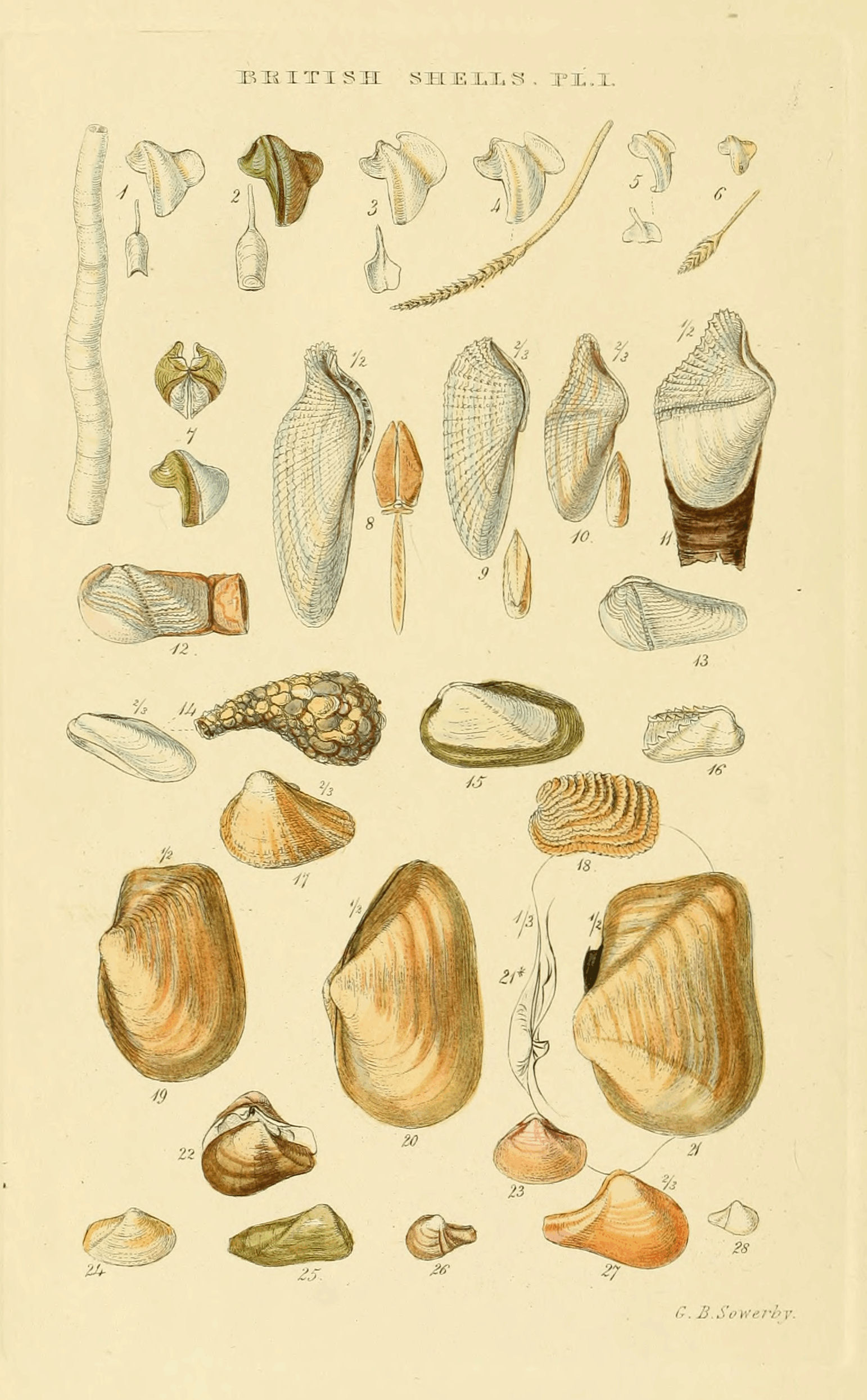
- Figure 26 Cardiomya costellata, Figure 27 Cuspidaria cuspidata

Scientific classification
- Kingdom: Animalia
- Phylum: Mollusca
- Class: Bivalvia
- Superorder: Anomalodesmata
- Superfamily: Cuspidarioidea
- Family: Cuspidariidae; Dall, 1886

Genera
- See text.

= Cuspidariidae =

Family of bivalves

Cuspidariidae is a family of small marine bivalve molluscs in the superfamily Cuspidarioidea.

== Genera ==
Genera in the family Cuspidariidae:

- Austroneaera A. W. B. Powell, 1937
- Bathyneaera Scarlato & Starobogatov, 1983
- Cardiomya A. Adams, 1864
- Cuspidaria Nardo, 1840
- Jeffreysomya F. Nordsieck, 1969
- Krylovina Valentich-Scott, 2012
- Leiomya A. Adams, 1864
- Luzonia Dall & E. A. Smith, 1890
- Myonera Dall & E. A. Smith, 1886
- Octoporia Scarlato & Starobogatov, 1983
- Plectodon P. P. Carpenter, 1864
- Pseudogrippina B. A. Marshall, 2002
- Pseudoneaera Sturany, 1899
- Rengea Kuroda & T. Habe, 1971
- Rhinoclama Dall & E. A. Smith, 1886
- Soyomya Okutani, 1985
- Thermomya C. Chen, Okutani, H. Watanabe & Kojima, 2018
- Tropidomya Dall & E. A. Smith, 1886
