= David Trexler =

American paleontologist

- Born: June 21, 1955 (age 71); Conrad, Montana, U.S.
- Education: University of Providence (Note: When in the 1980s David Trexler studied at the University of Providence, at the time the university's name was "University of Great Falls".); University of Calgary
- Spouse: Laurie Brandvold Trexler
- Children: 3
- Scientific career
- Fields: Vertebrate paleontology, Biology
- Workplaces: Old Trail Museum (Choteau, Montana); Children's Museum of Indianapolis; Montana Dinosaur Center

David Trexler (born 21 June 1955), also known as Dave Trexler, is an American paleontologist whose career focuses on dinosaurs and their environments. He is the main founder of the Montana Dinosaur Center.

== Early life and formation ==
David Trexler was born in Conrad, Montana from Clifford "Trex" Trexler (1908–1962) and Marion Kathryn Trexler (Note: In the present day, David Trexler's mother is mostly referred under the name of Marion Brandvold after having adopted since 1965 her second married name from her second Husband, John Brandvold.) (1912–2014, née Nehring), homesteaders in Bynum, Montana. Still in the present day, the Trexlers are a well established five-generation family continuying the tradition of the rodeo and cowboy culture.

In 1917, 5 year-old Marion Nehring (David Trexler's mother) found her first dinosaur bone close to the family's homestead property in Bynum. This event triggered her passion for rocks and fossils. Trexler's father married Marion Nehring in 1927 and ranched for a living until the Great Depression led the Trexlers to find different jobs as sideline activities. During this difficult period, Clifford Marion Trexler, David Trexler's elder and only brother, was born in 1933. Among the side jobs led by David's parents was one that Clifford senior did for a jeweler and lapidarist, but the jewelry store went bankrupt in 1937. The same year, once unemployed, Clifford "Trex" Trexler decided to open a "rock shop" in Great Falls, the "Trex Agate Shop", which he ran until his death in 1962. In 1965, Marion married John Brandvold (1937–2020) who in the early 1970s moved the Trex Agate Shop to Bynum. That shop and activity led young David Trexler to grow up among rocks and fossils, wandering in north-western Montana in search of fossils for sale being a common practice for him, and learning how to polish stones as of the age of 5.

In 1974 and onwards, after his graduation at high school, Trexler worked as a mechanic, machinist, welder, heavy equipment operator and truck driver, but he had to quit in 1985 because of a labour-related accident. In 1986 he decided to start studies of Biology and Mathematics at the University of Great Falls in Great Falls, Montana (present-day University of Providence). There, in 1990, he was granted Summa Cum Laude with a Bachelor of Science (BS) in Biology, and the recognition of secondary education ability. Immediately after that, Trexler continued his studies at the University of Calgary, in Canada, where he obtained a Master of Science (MSc) in Vertebrate Paleontology in 1995.

== The Maiasaura discovery and the Montana Dinosaur Center ==
In 1978 paleontologists Bob Makela and Jack Horner arrived at the Brandvolds' shop in Bynum. Not having found interesting fossils to them, they were about to leave, but Trexler's mother (Marion Brandvold), told them that she had something else. Still at the shop, she showed them two tiny bones that Horner identified as baby dinosaur bones. They followed her to the Brandvolds' house, where she'd been keeping the remains of at least four individuals in a coffee can. For years Trexler's mother had been finding these bones and she and her husband John Brandvold had been trying to put them together. This made Makela and Horner go to the site where these remains were apparently abundant (South of Choteau, Montana), and they discovered nests and juveniles of a till-then unknown species of hadrosaur which the next year in 1979 they described and named Maiasaura. With time the site earned the name "Egg Mountain", because of the abundance of hadrosaur eggs and eggshell pieces found in it.

As the son of Marion Brandvold, discoverer of the first known Maiasaura remains, and as a local in Bynum, David Trexler witnessed and even participated to these important events (it was the first time that evidence had been found of adult dinosaurs bringing parental care to their offspring) and as of the 1980s he wanted to create a local museum in Bynum. After overcoming a number of difficulties, Trexler founded his museum in 1995 (the same year he had obtained his Master of Science in Vertebrate Paleontology) under the name of "Timescale Adventures". In 2001 it changed name to "Two Medicine Dinosaur Center" and on 11 August 2020 it received its current name, "Montana Dinosaur Center".

From 1998 to 2004, David Trexler's mother Marion Brandvold led a legal fight with the Yale and Princeton universities in order to recover the original Maisasaura bones that she had found back in the 1970s. In 2004 she obtained a satisfactory issue and, since then, these original bones of juveniles that led to the description of the genus Maiasaura are preserved and exhibited at the Montana Dinosaur Center. The holotype of Maisasaura, though, a skull discovered by David Trexler's wife, Laurie Trexler, still remains at the Peabody Museum of Natural History.

== Personal life ==
On August 7, 1977, David Trexler married Laurie Brandvold Trexler. They have three children. Laurie, his wife, is the discoverer of the Maiasaura specimen that paleontologists Bob Makela and Jack Horner established as the holotype of their proposed description of Maiasaura in 1979.

== Media ==
- Trexler was part of the team of scientific advisors in the documentary television film Secrets of the Dinosaur Mummy (2008)
- Trexler has been one of the guests in the podcast series "I Know Dino: The Big Dinosaur Podcast" (2016)
