= Bynum =

Bynum may refer to:

== People with the surname ==
- Andrew Bynum (born 1987), American basketball player
- Camryn Bynum (born 1998), American football player
- Clarke Bynum, American basketball player
- Freddie Bynum, American baseball player
- G. T. Bynum, American politician; mayor of Tulsa, Oklahoma
- Janelle Bynum, American politician
- Jesse Atherton Bynum, American congressman
- Juanita Bynum (born 1959), American author and televangelist
- Kenny Bynum, American football player
- Kevin Takashita-Bynum (born 1993), National Geographic Explorer
- Mike Bynum, American baseball player
- Preston Bynum (1939–2018), American politician and lobbyist
- R. N. Bynum (1858–1927), American merchant and politician
- Reggie Bynum, American football player
- Sarah Shun-lien Bynum, American writer
- Taylor Ho Bynum, musician
- Terrell Bynum (disambiguation), multiple people
- Will Bynum, American basketball player
- W. F. Bynum (born 1943), British historian of medicine
- William P. Bynum (1820–1909), justice of the North Carolina Supreme Court

== Places ==
=== United States ===
- Bynum, Alabama
- Bynum, Texas
- Bynum, North Carolina
- Bynum, Montana
- Bynum Reservoir
