= Montana Dinosaur Center =

The Montana Dinosaur Center
- Established: 1995
- Location: Bynum, Montana
- Coordinates: 47.979167°N 112.31167°W
- Type: Natural history museum
- Website: www.tmdinosaurcenter.org

The Montana Dinosaur Center is a 501(c)(3) non-profit and educational institute located in Bynum, Montana, United States, that opened in 1995. It is part of the Montana Dinosaur Trail and home to a skeletal model of what is believed to be the world's longest dinosaur, a diplodocus. The center also houses the first baby dinosaur bones ever collected, the original discovery done by Marion Brandvold and reported by paleontologists Bob Makela (1940–1987) and Jack Horner (born 1946).

== History ==
The origins of the Montana Dinosaur Center are directly related to the nearby "rock shop", Trex Agate Shop, and the discovery of the first remains of the hadrosaurian dinosaur today known as Maiasaura. Marion Kathryn Brandvold (1912–2014, née Nehring), had inherited the "rock shop" from her first husband, Clifford "Trex" Trexler (1908–1962). In the years that preceded 1978, she and her second husband, John Brandvold (1937–2020), had been finding small bones around the nearby municipality of Choteau, bones that they had been trying to put together. In the Summer of 1978 paleontologists Bob Makela and Jack Horner arrived at the shop, looking for local fossils. That visit led to the identification of the first baby dinosaur bones ever discovered. From her first marriage with Clifford "Trex" Trexler (1908–1962), founder of the Trex Agate Shop in 1937, Marion had two children. The younger, David Trexler, aware of the importance of the discovery, led studies of Paleontology at the University of Calgary in Canada and early in the 1980s started planning the creation of a local museum in Bynum.

After overcoming a number of difficulties, David Trexler established the "Timescale Adventures" center in 1995. The land on which the Center sits had been donated by John Brandvold. In 2001 it changed name to "Two Medicine Dinosaur Center" and on 11 August 2020 it received its current name, Montana Dinosaur Center.

In the meantime, as of 1998, Trexler's mother Marion Brandvold had started a legal fight against the Yale and Princeton universities so that she could recover the bones of the juvenile Maiasauras that she had found back in the 1970s. The bones finally returned to Bynum in 2004 and were installed on display at the Two Medicine Dinosaur Center.

== Collections ==
In addition to the Diplodocus skeleton and the fossilised bones of juvenile Maiasaura, the center houses specimens of new species of several types of dinosaurs, including hadrosaurs, ceratopsians, and tyrannosaurs.

== Scientific activities and popularisation of science ==
The Montana Dinosaur Center is one of two museums in Montana that employ degreed paleontological staff. The center provides assistance and expertise to other Montana Dinosaur Trail facilities in addition to conducting its own research and public education programs. It is open 7 days a week from Memorial Day through Labor Day and with varying hours the rest of the year. The mission of the center is to incorporate public education with scientific research, and the center offers the widest variety of paleontology programs available to the public.
