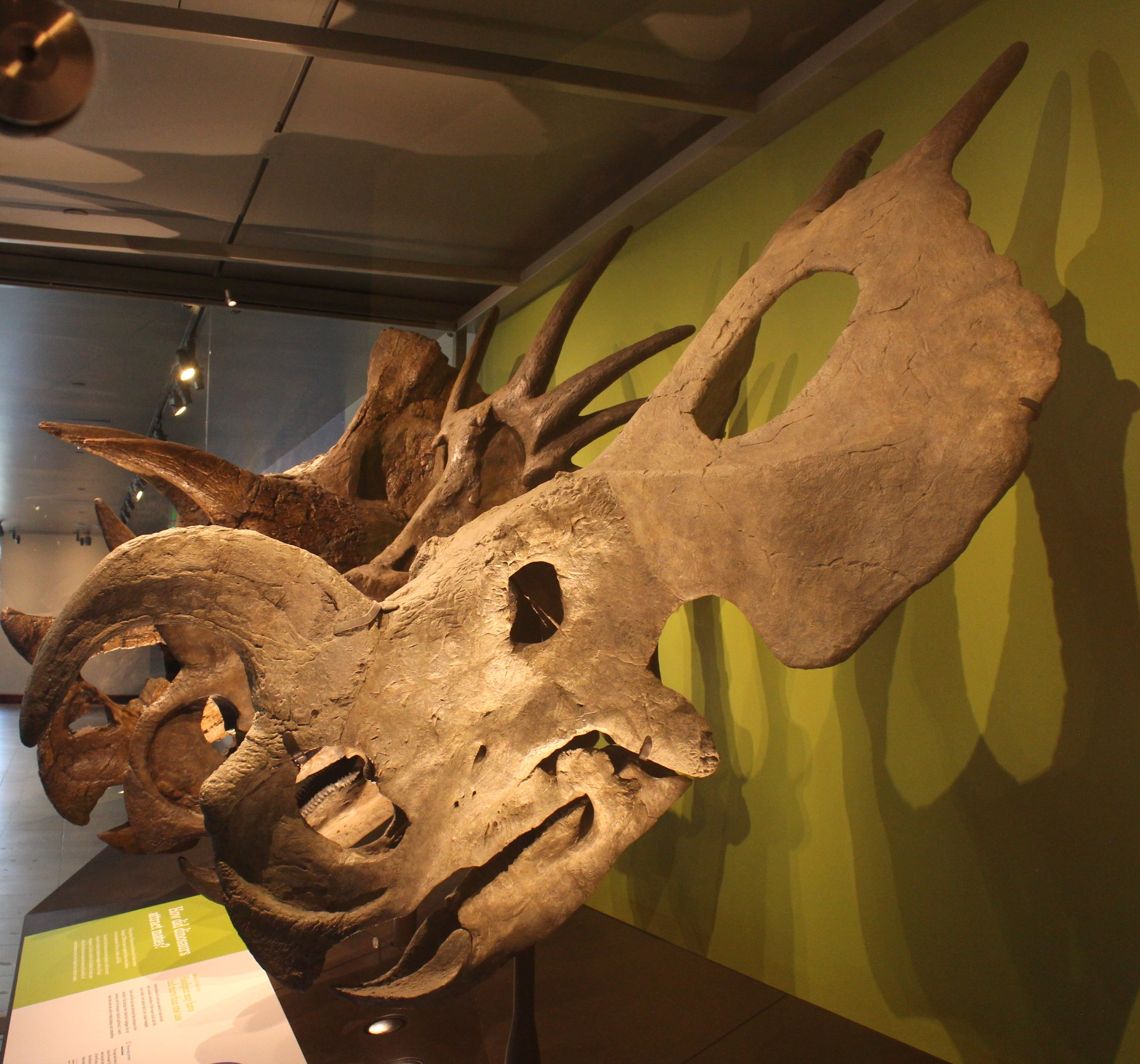
- Reconstructed skull, Natural History Museum of Los Angeles County

Scientific classification
- Kingdom: Animalia
- Phylum: Chordata
- Class: Reptilia
- Clade: Dinosauria
- Clade: †Ornithischia
- Clade: †Ceratopsia
- Family: †Ceratopsidae
- Subfamily: †Centrosaurinae
- Tribe: †Pachyrhinosaurini
- Genus: †Einiosaurus; Sampson, 1995
- Species: †E. procurvicornis

Binomial name
- †Einiosaurus procurvicornis Sampson, 1995

= Einiosaurus =

Einiosaurus Temporal range: Upper Cretaceous, 74.5–74 Ma

Ceratopsian dinosaur genus from Upper Cretaceous period

Einiosaurus is a genus of herbivorous centrosaurine ceratopsian dinosaur from the Upper Cretaceous (Campanian stage) of northwestern Montana. The name means 'bison lizard', in a combination of Blackfeet Indian eini and Latinized Ancient Greek sauros; the specific name (procurvicornis) means 'with a forward-curving horn' in Latin. Einiosaurus is medium-sized with an estimated body length at 4.5 metres (15 ft).

== History of discovery ==
=== Horner's expeditions to Landslide Butte ===
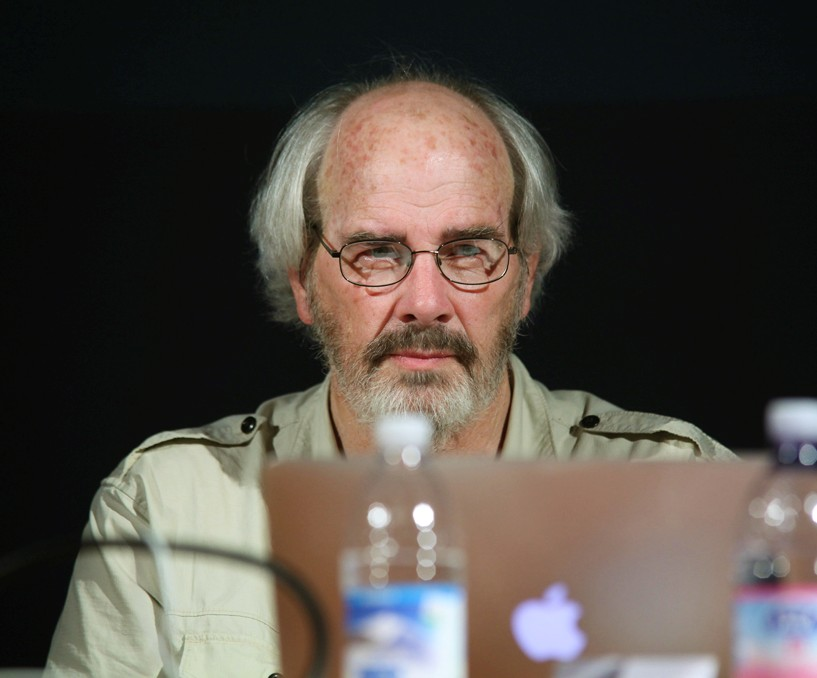
Jack Horner led the team that discovered Einiosaurus

Einiosaurus is an exclusively Montanan dinosaur, and all of its known remains are currently held at the Museum of the Rockies in Bozeman, Montana. At least fifteen individuals of varying ages are represented by three adult skulls and hundreds of other bones from two low-diversity, monospecific (one species) bonebeds, which were discovered by Jack Horner in 1985 and excavated from 1985 to 1989 by Museum of the Rockies field crews.

Horner had not been searching for horned dinosaurs. In the spring of 1985 he had been informed by landowner Jim Peebles that he would no longer be allowed access to the Willow Creek "Egg Mountain" site where during six years a nesting colony of Maiasaura had been excavated. This forced Horner to find an alternative site because supplies had already been bought for a new summer season and fourteen volunteers and students expected to be employed by him. He investigated two sites, Devil's Pocket and Red Rocks, that however proved to contain too few fossils. For some years, since 1982, Horner had requested from the Blackfeet Indian Tribal Council access to the Landslide Butte site. The field notes of Charles Whitney Gilmore from the 1920s indicated that dinosaur eggs could be found there. The council had consistently turned down his requests because they feared widespread disturbance of the reservation. However, one of its members, Marvin Weatherwax, had earlier in 1985 observed that an excavation by Horner of a mosasaurid in the Four Horns Lake had caused only limited damage to the landscape. In early July, the council granted Horner access to the entire reservation.

Early in August, Horner's associate Bob Makela discovered the Dino Ridge Quarry, containing extensive ceratopsid remains, on the land of farmer Ricky Reagan. Continual rainfall hampered operations that year. On 20 June 1986, a crew of sixteen returned to reopen the quarry. A large and dense concentration of bones, a bonebed, was excavated, with up to forty bones per square metre being present. This was interpreted as representing an entire herd that had perished. In late August 1986, Horner and preparator Carrie Ancell on the land of Gloria Sundquist discovered a second horned dinosaur site, at one mile distance from the first, called the Canyon Bone Bed, in which two relatively complete skulls were dug up. The skulls had to be removed from a rather steep cliff and weighed about half a tonne when plastered. They were airlifted by a Bell UH-1 Iroquois of the United States Army National Guard into trucks to be transported. The aberrant build of these skulls first suggested to Horner that they might represent an unknown taxon. Unexpectedly benefiting from a grant of $204,000 by the MacArthur Fellows Program, Horner was able to reopen the two bonebed quarries in 1987. That year almost all fossils were removed that could be accessed without using mechanised earth-moving equipment. Also, an additional horned dinosaur skull was excavated from a somewhat younger layer. In 1988, more ceratopsid material was found in a more southern site, the Blacktail Creek North. In the second week of June 1989, student Scott Donald Sampson in the context of his doctoral research with a small crew reopened the Canyon Bone Bed, while Patrick Leiggi that summer with a limited number of workers restarted excavating the Dino Ridge Quarry. The same year, Horner himself found more horned dinosaur fossils at the Blacktail Creek North. In 1990, the expeditions were ended because the reservation allowed access to commercial fossil hunters who quickly strip-mined sites with bulldozers, through a lack of proper documentation greatly diminishing the scientific value of the discoveries.

=== Interpretation of the collected fossils ===
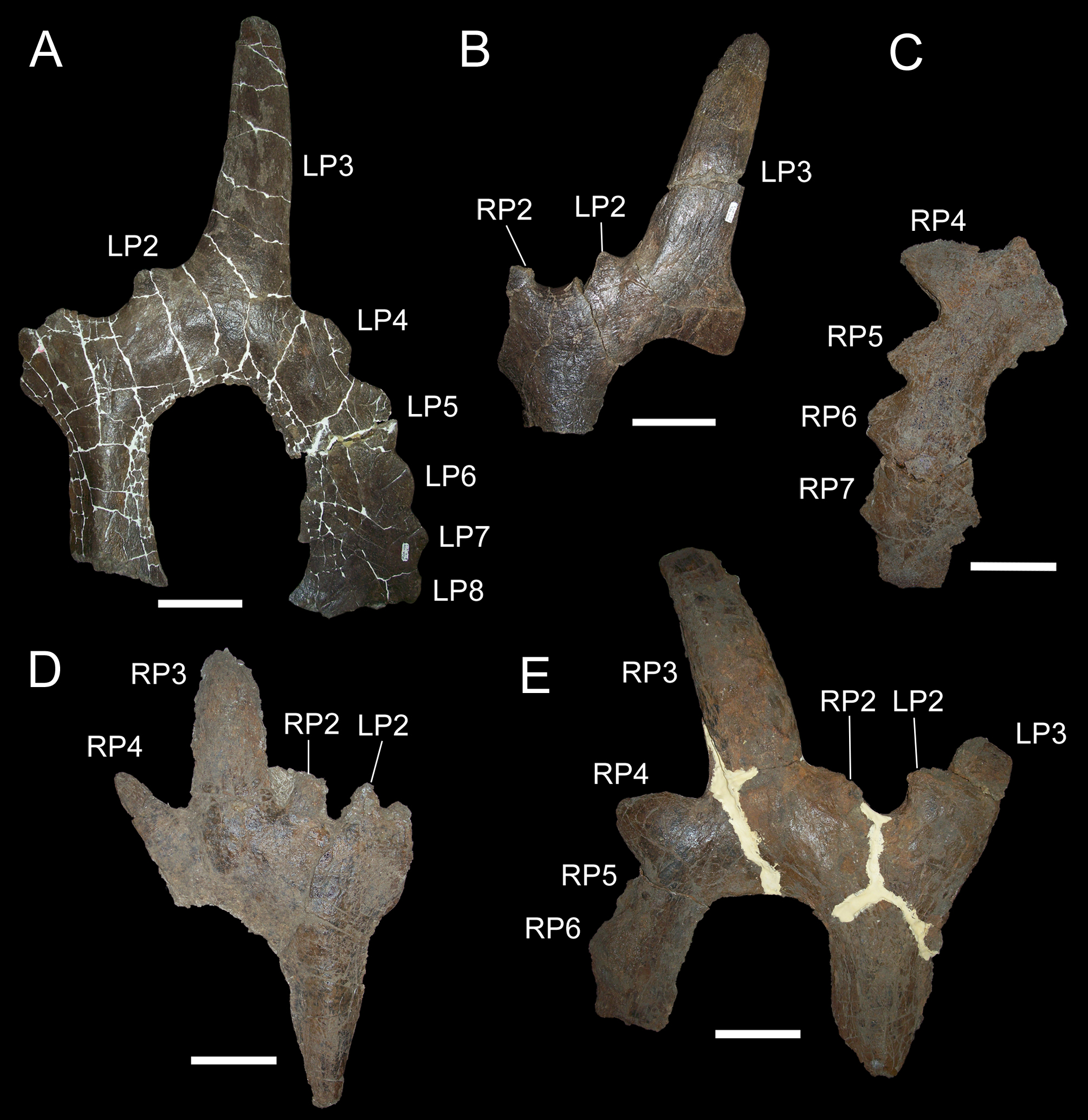
Einiosaurus parietal frill bones, including of holotype specimen (A, MOR 456 8-9-6-1)

At the time of the expeditions, it was assumed that all horned dinosaur fossils found in the reservation belonged to a single species, especially as they came from a limited geological time period, its duration estimated at about half a million years. In the 1920s, George Freyer Sternberg had already found ceratopsid bones there, that were named as a second species of Styracosaurus: Styracosaurus ovatus. The material had been rather limited and the validity of this species had been doubted, some considering it a nomen dubium. The abundant new remains seemed to prove that the species was real, also because it clearly differed from the type species of Styracosaurus, Styracosaurus albertensis. The comprehensive taphonomic study by Raymond Robert Rogers from 1990 however, did not commit itself fully to this identification, merely mentioning a Styracosaurus sp. Rogers had joined the expedition in 1987. This reflected the fact that the expedition members had started to take the possibility into account that the species was completely new to science, informally referring to it as "Styracosaurus makeli" in honour of Bob Makela, who had died in a traffic accident in June 1987. In 1990, this name, as an invalid nomen nudum because it lacked a description, appeared in a photo caption in a book by Stephen Czerkas.

Horner was an expert on the Hadrosauridae, several sites of which had also been discovered in Landslide Butte, including the juveniles and eggs that were the focus of his research. He had less affinity for other kinds of dinosaurs. In 1987 and 1989, to resolve the Styracosaurus question, horned dinosaur specialist Peter Dodson was invited to investigate the new ceratopsian finds. In 1990, the fossil material was seen by Dodson as strengthening the case for the validity of a separate Styracosaurus ovatus, to be distinguished from Styracosaurus albertensis.

Horner had gradually changed his mind on the subject. While still thinking that a single population of horned dinosaurs had been present, he began to see it as a chronospecies, an evolutionary series of taxa. In 1992, he described them in an article as three "transitional taxa" that had spanned the gap between the older Styracosaurus and the later Pachyrhinosaurus. He deliberately declined to name these three taxa. The oldest form was indicated as "Transitional Taxon A", mainly represented by skull MOR 492. Then came "Taxon B" – the many skeletons of the Dinosaur Ridge Quarry and the Canyon Bone Bed. The youngest was "Taxon C", represented by skull MOR 485 found in 1987 and the horned dinosaur fossils of the Blacktail Creek North. In a 1997 book, Horner referred to the three taxa as "centrosaurine 1.", "centrosaurine 2." and "centrosaurine 3.".

=== Sampson names Einiosaurus ===
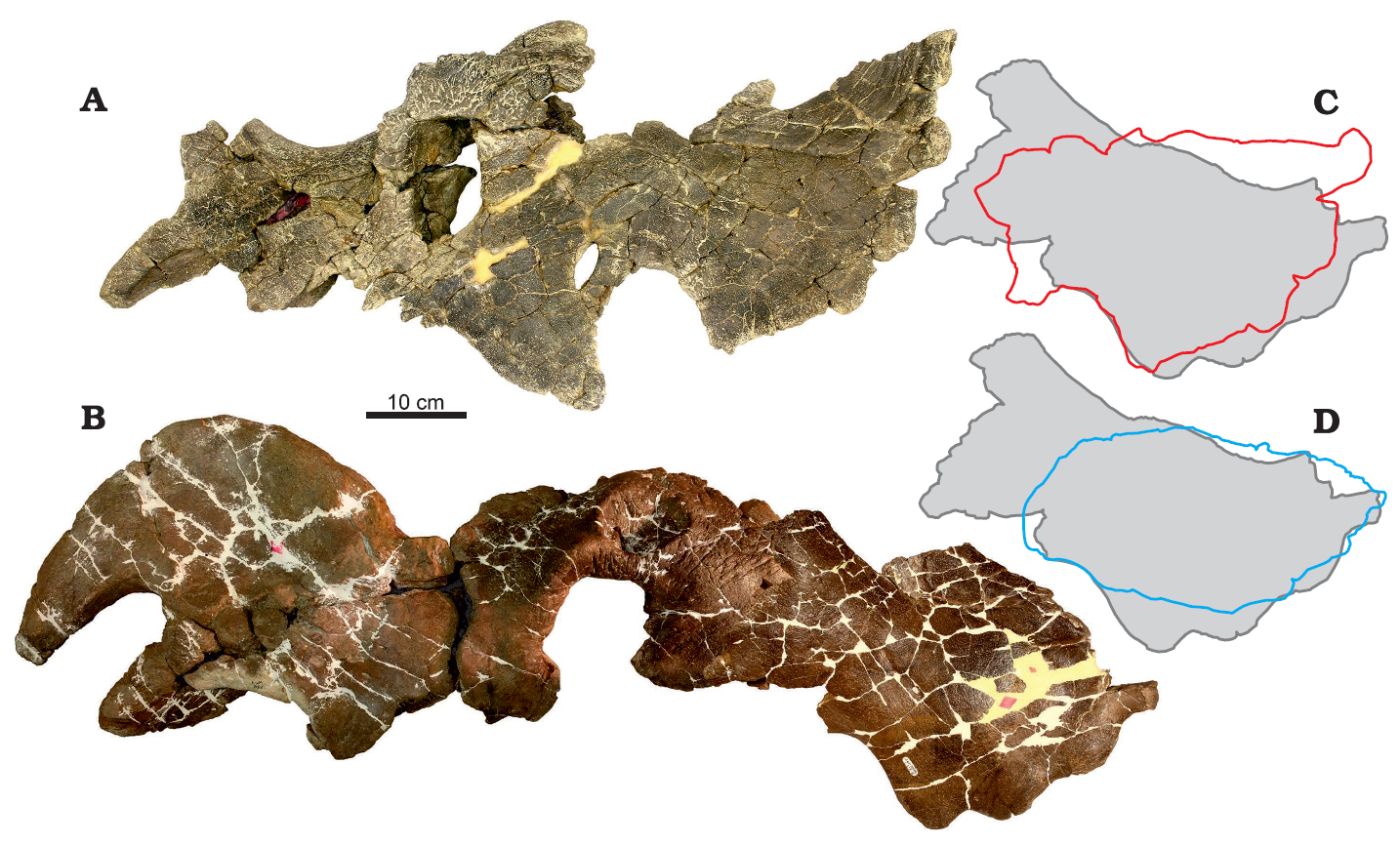
Subadult Einiosaurus (A, specimen MOR 456 8-8-87-1) and adult holotype (B) skull, with outlines of squamosal bones superimposed for comparison

In 1994, Sampson, in a talk during the annual meeting of the Society of Vertebrate Paleontology, named Horner's "Taxon B" as a new genus and species, Einiosaurus procurvicornis. Although an abstract was published containing a sufficient description, making the name valid, it did not yet identify by inventory number a holotype, a name-bearing specimen. The same abstract named Type C as Achelousaurus horneri. In 1995, Sampson published a larger article, indicating the holotype. The generic name Einiosaurus is derived from the Blackfeet eini, "American bison", and Latinised Greek saurus, "lizard". The name was chosen to honour the Blackfeet tribe but also to reflect the fact that ceratopsids were, in Sampson's words, "the buffalo of the Cretaceous", living in herds and having a complex life. According to Sampson, the name should be pronounced as "eye-knee-o-saurus". The specific name is derived from Latin procurvus, "bent forwards", and cornu, "horn", referring to the forwards curving nasal horn.

The holotype, MOR 456-8-9-6-1, was found in a layer of the Two Medicine Formation dating from the late Campanian. It consists of a partial skull, including the nasal horn, the supraorbital area and part of the parietal bone of the skull frill. The skull represents an adult individual. Sampson referred many other specimens to the species. He indicated that additional fossil material from the Canyon Bone Bed had been subsumed under the inventory number MOR 456. This included two further adult skulls and single cranial and postcranial bones from individuals of varying age classes. Furthermore, the fossils from the Dino Ridge Quarry were referred. They had been catalogued within number MOR 373. They consisted of about two hundred non-articulated bones, again from animals of different ages.

=== Possible Einiosaurus finds ===
In addition to fossils that have been unequivocally assigned to Einiosaurus, some other material has been found of which the identity is uncertain. In 2006, it was also proposed that Monoclonius lowei, a dubious species based on a skull (specimen CMN 8790) from the Dinosaur Park Formation, could be a sub-adult specimen of Styracosaurus, Einiosaurus, or Achelousaurus, with which it is roughly contemporaneous. In addition, some indeterminate specimens from the Two Medicine Formation – such as fragmentary skull MOR 464 or snout MOR 449 – may belong to Einiosaurus or the two other roughly contemporary ceratopsids Achelousaurus and Styracosaurus ovatus. The subadult specimen MOR 591 from the uppermost Two Medicine Formation was assigned to Achelousaurus in 1995 and henceforward, but in 2021, John Wilson and Jack Scannella stated that it could also possibly belong to Einiosaurus.

== Description ==
=== Size and distinguishing traits ===
Size comparison with human

Einiosaurus was a herbivorous dinosaur. It is generally as large as Achelousaurus, though far less robust. In 2010, Gregory S. Paul estimated the body length of Einiosaurus at 4.5 metres (15 ft), its weight at 1.3 tonnes (1.3 long tons; 1.4 short tons). Both taxa fall within the typical size range of the Centrosaurinae.

In 1995, Sampson indicated several distinguishing traits. The nasal horn has a base that is long from front to rear, is transversely flattened, and is strongly curved forwards in some adult specimens. The supraorbital "brow" horns as far as they are present are low and rounded with a convex surface on the inner side. The parietal parts of the rear edge of the skull frill together bear a single pair of large curved spikes sticking out to behind.

Einiosaurus differs from all other known Centrosaurinae by a longer-based and more procurved nasal horn and by a supraorbital horn that is longer-based and more rounded in side view. It differs from Achelousaurus in particular in having large parietal spikes that are not directed sideways to some extent.

As a centrosaurine, Einiosaurus walked on all fours, had a large head with a beak, a moderately large skull frill, a short powerful neck, heavily muscled forelimbs, a high torso, powerful hindlimbs and a relatively short tail.

=== Skull ===
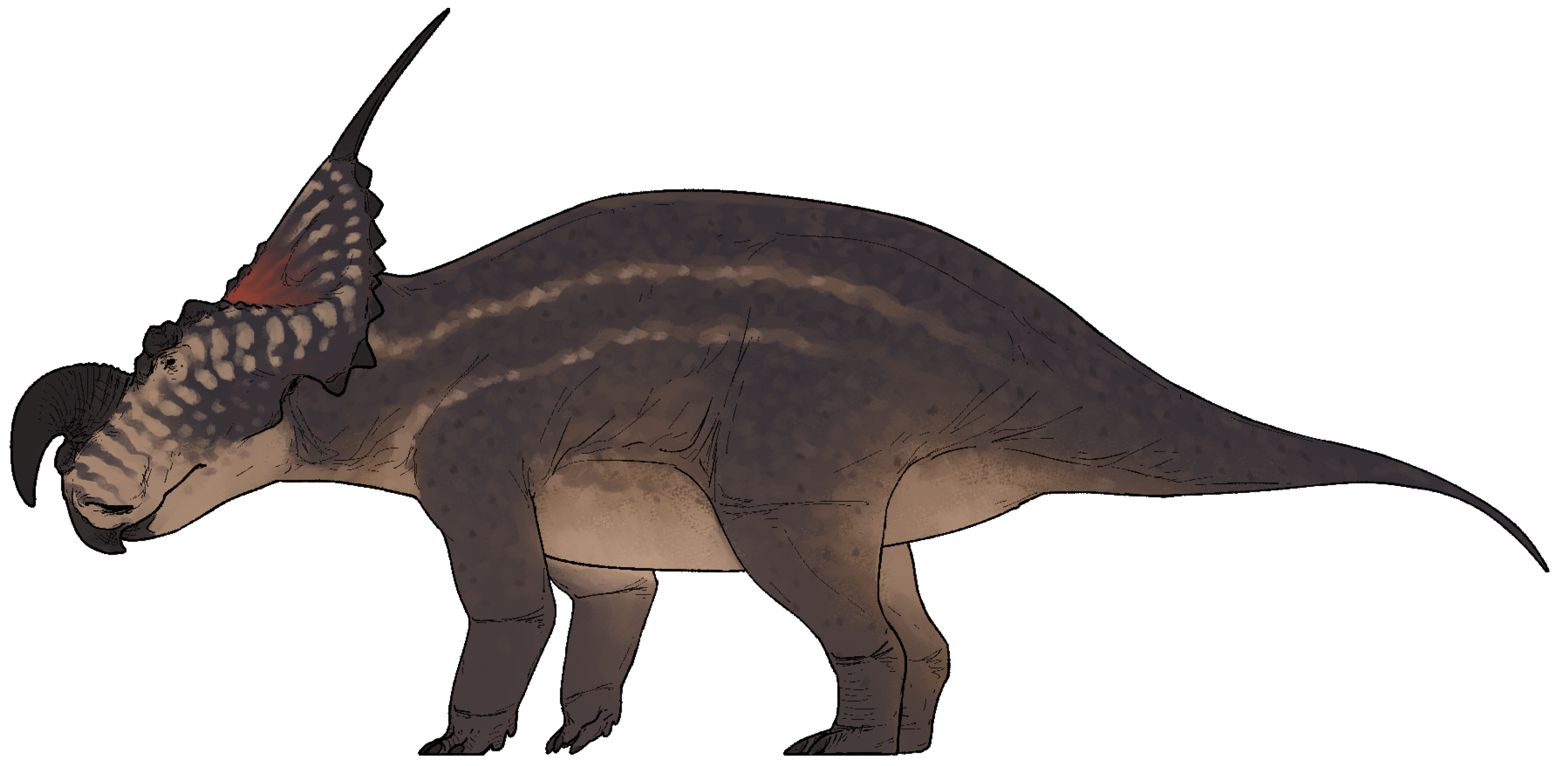
Life restoration

In 1995, Sampson only described the skull, not the postcrania, the parts behind the skull. This was motivated by the fact that in centrosaurines the postcranial skeleton is "conservative", i.e. differs only slightly among species. Sampson could not find traits in which Einiosaurus differed from a generalised centrosaurine.

The holotype skull is the largest known and has a total length of 1.56 metres (5.1 ft). The snout is relatively narrow and pointed. The top of the snout is formed by the paired nasal bones. Their top surfaces together bear the core of the nasal horn. In 1995, apart from the skulls eight nasal horns from both bonebeds were referred to Einiosaurus. Two of these were from subadults. These show how the horn developed during the growth of the animal. The initially separated core halves fused from the tip downwards and joined into a single structure on the midline. In the subadult stage, the core still showed a suture, however. The subadult cores were transversely flattened and relatively small, not higher than 12 centimetres (4.7 in). Six cores were of adults. They showed two distinctive types. Two cores were small and erect, i.e. vertically directed. The four others were large and procurved, strongly curving to the front. The adult horns resembled the subadult ones in being transversely compressed and having a long base from front to rear. To behind they nearly reached the frontal bones.

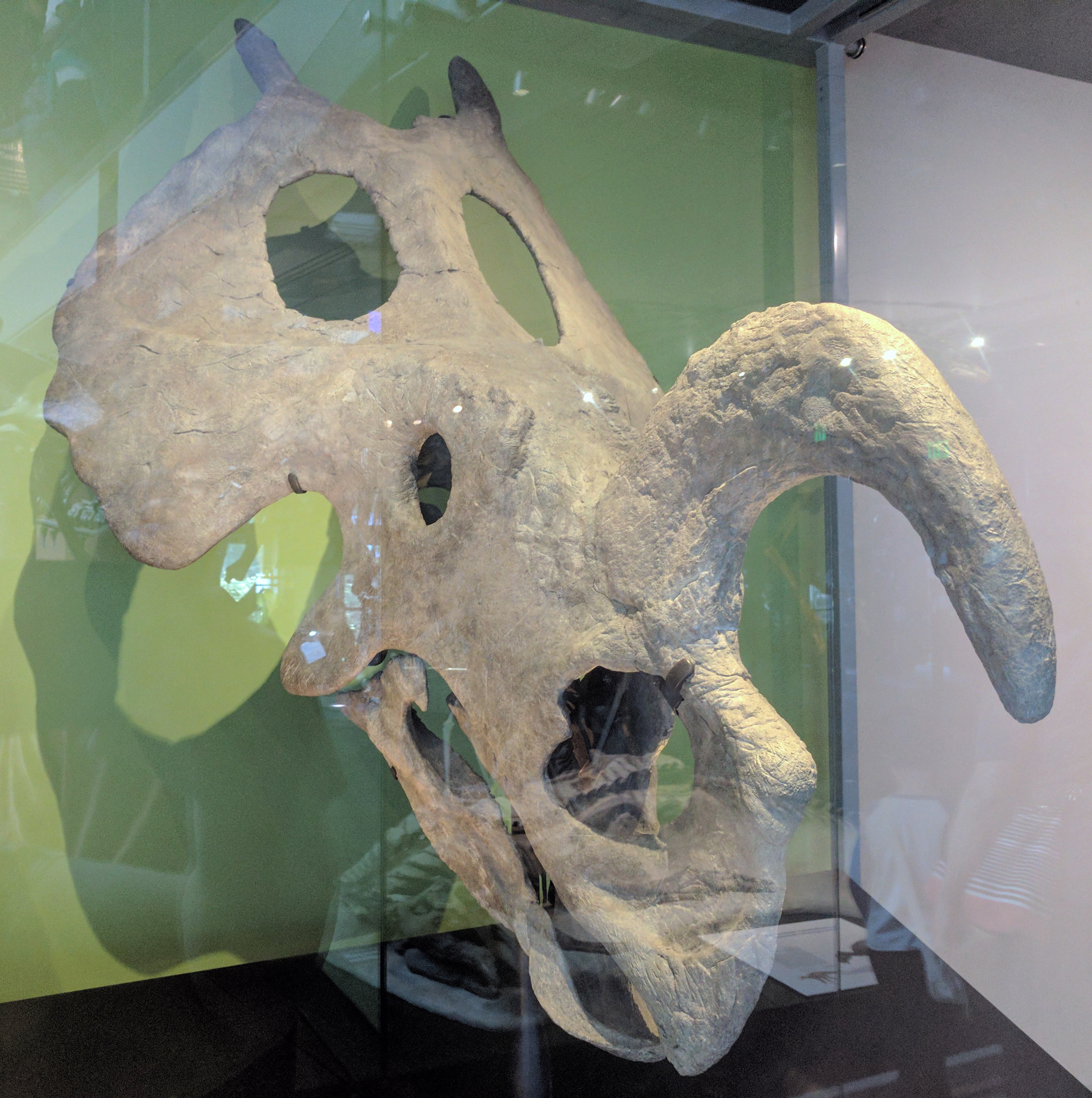
Reconstructed skull in semi-profile

Sampson compared the nasal horn of Einiosaurus with the horns of two related species, Centrosaurus and Styracosaurus. From large bonebeds, numerous nasal horns of Centrosaurus are known, presenting a considerable range of morphologies. Despite all this variation, Einiosaurus horns can be clearly distinguished from them. They are more laterally compressed, unlike the more oval cross-section of Centrosaurus horns. The adult horns are also much more procurved than any nasal horn found in Centrosaurus beds. Styracosaurus horncores are much longer than those of Einiosaurus, up to half a metre in length, and erect or slightly recurved to the rear.

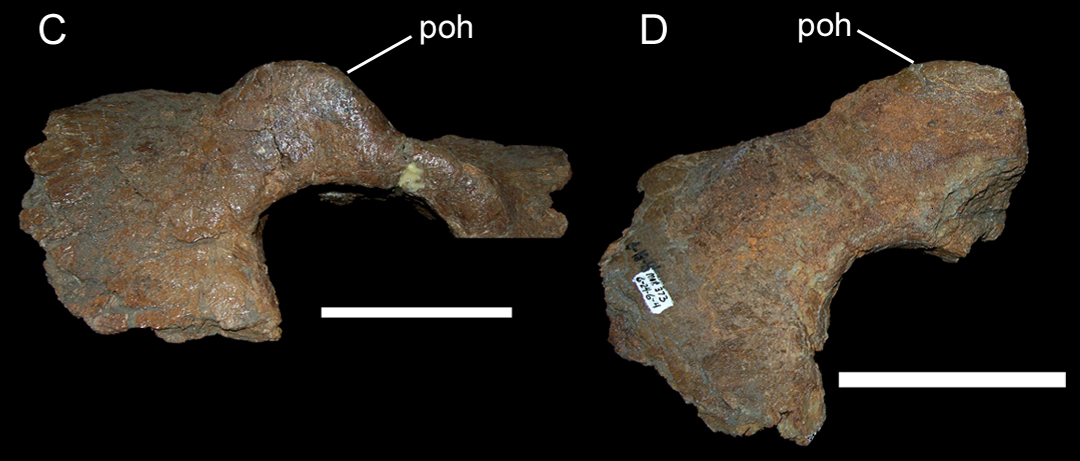
Postorbital bones

Apart from a horn on the snout, centrosaurines also had horns above the eye sockets, supraorbital horncores. These cores were formed by a fusion of the postorbital bone with the much smaller palpebral bone in front of it. Nine subadult or adult "brow horns" were found. They all shared the same build in being low, long and rounded. This differs from the usual pointed horns with an oval base seen in typical centrosaurines. It is also unlike the supraorbital bosses seen in Achelousaurus and Pachyrhinosaurus. Nevertheless, some Einiosaurus horns seemed to approach bosses. Three older individuals featured a total of five instances in which the horn as such was replaced by a low rounded mass, sometimes with a large pit in the usual location of the horn point. The large holotype has a rounded mass above the left eye socket but a pit, eighty-five millimetres long and sixty-four millimetres wide, on the right side. According to Sampson, this reflects a general trend with centrosaurines to re-absorb the brow horns in later life. All known specimens of Styracosaurus e.g. have a pitted region instead of true horns. The Einiosaurus holotype additionally has a rough bone mass at the rear postorbital region on the left side.

In all centrosaurines, the frontal bones are folded in such a way that a "double" roof is formed with a "supracranial cavity" in between. A fontanelle pierces the upper layer. In Einiosaurus, this cavity runs sideways, continuing to below into the brow horn. With Centrosaurus and Styracosaurus these passages are more narrow and do not reach the horns but Pachyrhinosaurus shows a comparable extension. Sampson in 1995 also expounded his general views on such skull roofs, which are not easy to interpret due to fusion. According to him, the frontal bones always extended to the parietals, so that the paired postorbitals never contacted. The parietal bone made only a small contribution to the fontanelle. The floor of the cavity is, at the frontal-parietal suture, pierced by a large foramen into the braincase, the function of this "pineal opening" being unknown.

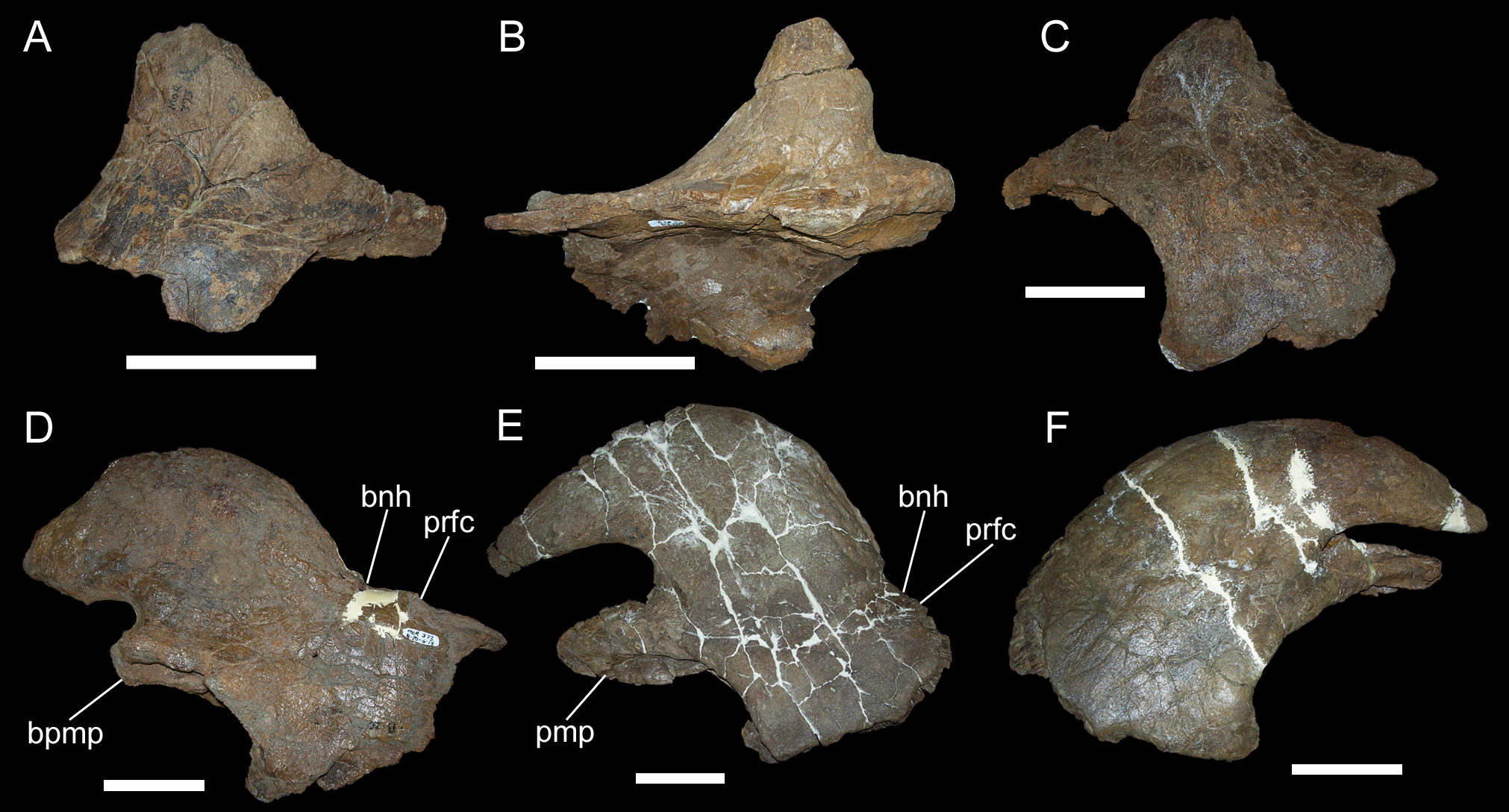
Nasal bones of younger individuals in the top row and older individuals in the bottom row

Its snout is narrow and very pointed. It is typically portrayed with a low, strongly forward and downward curving nasal horn that resembles a bottle opener, though this may only occur in some adults. The supraorbital (over-the-eye) horns are low, short and triangular in top view if present at all, as opposed to the chasmosaurines, such as Triceratops, which have prominent supraorbital horns. A pair of large spikes, the third epiparietals, projects backwards from the relatively small frill. Smaller osteoderms adorn the frill edge. The first epiparietals are largely absent.

== Evolution ==
=== Horner's hypothesis of anagenesis ===
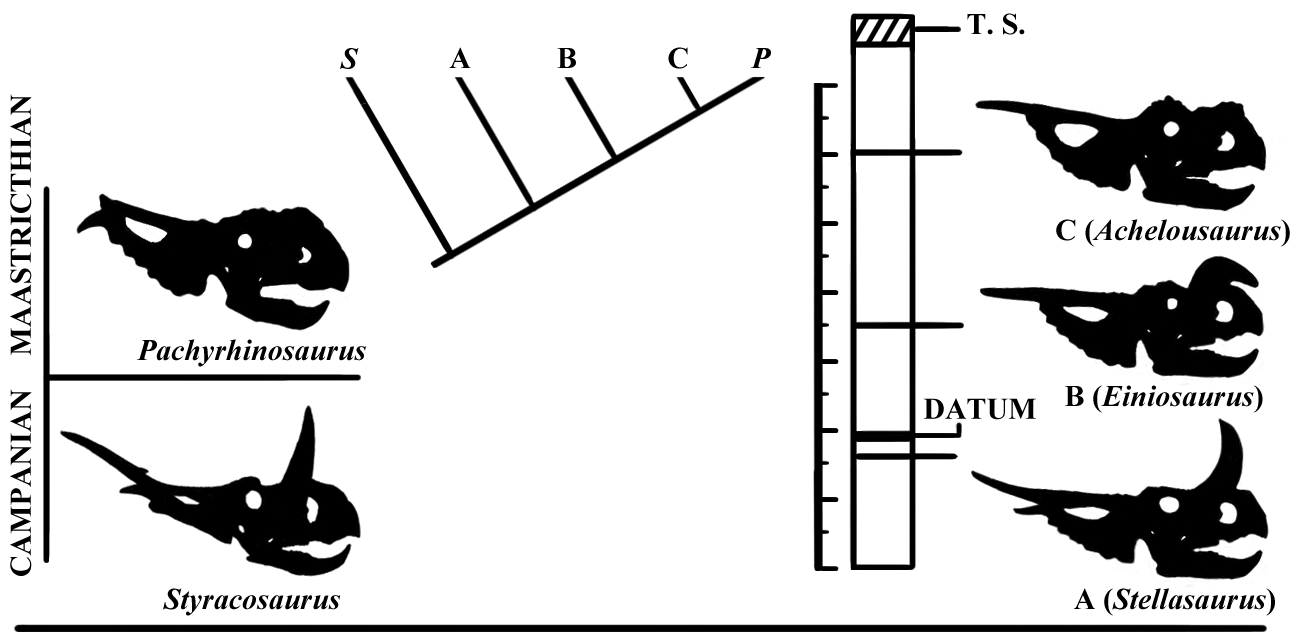
Diagram showing evolutionary lineage proposed by Horner et al., 1992

In 1992, the study by Horner et al. tried to account for the fact that within a limited geological period of time (about half a million years) there had been a quick succession of animal communities in the upper Two Medicine Formation. Normally, this would be interpreted as a series of invasions, with the new animal types replacing the old ones. But Horner noted that the newer forms often had a strong similarity to the previous types. This suggested to him that he had discovered a rare proof of evolution in action: the later fauna was basically the old one but at a more evolved stage. The various types found were not distinct species but transitional forms developed within a process of anagenesis. This conformed to the assumption, prevalent at the time, that a species should last about two to three million years. A further indication, according to Horner, was the failure to identify true autapomorphies – unique traits that prove a taxon is a separate species. The fossils instead showed a gradual change from basal (or ancestral) into more derived characters.

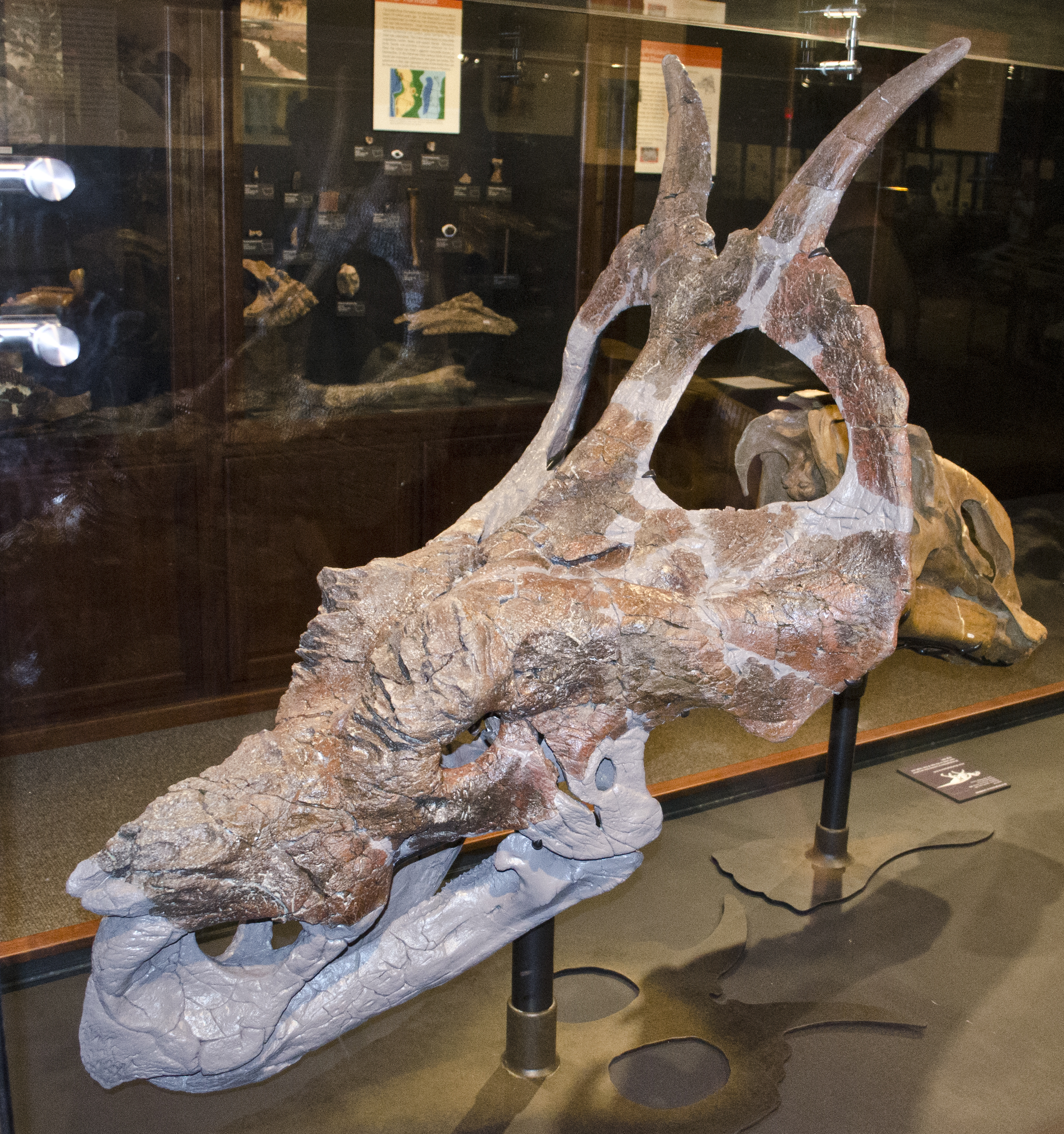
Reconstructed skull of Achelousaurus, the direct descendant of Einiosaurus according to Horner, in the Museum of the Rockies

The horned dinosaurs discovered by Horner exemplified this phenomenon. In the lowest layers of the Two Medicine Formation, 60 m (200 ft) below the overlaying Bearpaw Formation, "Transitional Taxon A" was present. It seemed to be identical to Styracosaurus albertensis, differing from it only in the possession of just a single pair of parietal spikes. The middle layers, 45 m (150 ft) below the Bearpaw, contained "Transitional Taxon B" that also had a single spike pair but differed in the form of its nasal horn that curved to the front over the anterior branches of the nasal bones. In the upper strata, 20 m (65 ft) below the Bearpaw, "Transitional Taxon C" had been excavated. It too had a spike pair but now the nasal horn was fused with the front branches. The upper surface of the horn was elevated and very rough. The orbital horns showed coarse ridges. Subsequently, "Taxon A" was named Stellasaurus, "Taxon B" became Einiosaurus, while "Taxon C" became Achelousaurus. In 1992, Horner et al. did not name these as species for the explicit reason that the entire evolutionary sequence was seen as representing a grade of transitional ceratopsians between Styracosaurus albertensis, known from the Judith River Formation, and the derived, hornless Pachyrhinosaurus from the Horseshoe Canyon Formation, which had the spike pair and bosses on the nose and above the eyes, as well as additional frill ornamentation.

Horner thought he had found the mechanism driving this evolution, elaborating on ideas he had developed even before he had investigated Landslide Butte. The animals were living on a narrow strip on the east-coast of Laramidia, bordering the Western Interior Seaway and constrained in the west by the 3 to 4 kilometres (2 to 2.5 mi) high proto-Rocky Mountains. During the Bearpaw Transgression sea levels were rising, steadily reducing the width of their coastal habitat from about 300 km (200 mi) to 30 km (20 mi), leading to stronger selection pressures. The lower number of individuals that the smaller habitat could have sustained constituted a population bottleneck, making rapid evolution possible. Increased sexual selection would have induced changes in the sexual ornamentation such as spikes, horns and bosses. A reduced environmental stress by lower sea levels on the other hand, would be typified by adaptive radiation. That sexual selection had indeed been the main mechanism would be proven by the fact that young individuals of all three populations were very similar: they all had two frill spikes, a small nasal horn pointing to the front, and orbital horns in the form of slightly elevated knobs. Only in the adult phase did they begin to differ. According to Horner, this also showed that the populations were very closely related.

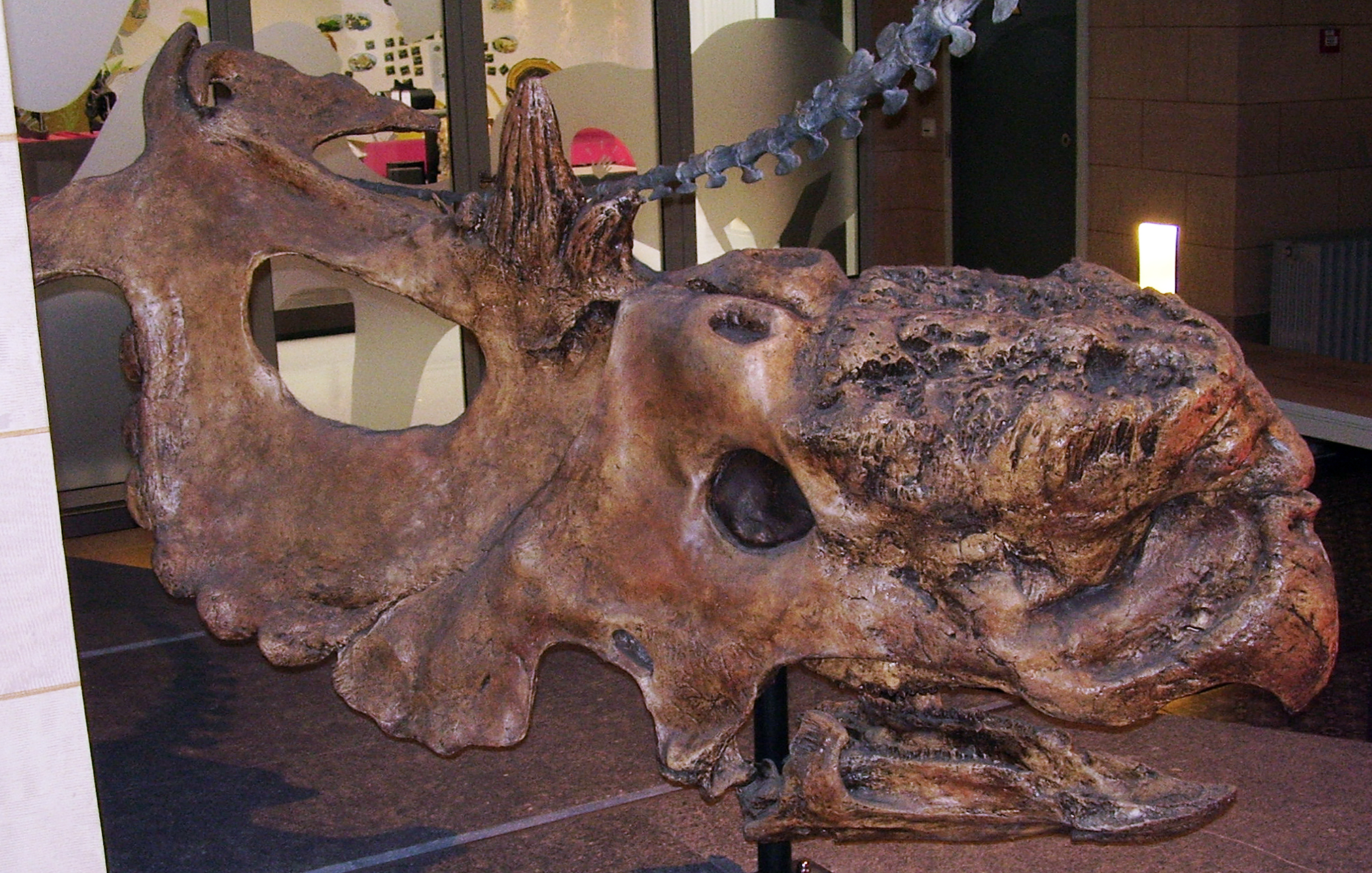
Skull cast of Pachyrhinosaurus, a descendant of Einiosaurus and Achelousaurus according to Horner, at the Museum of Natural Sciences of Belgium

Horner did not perform an exact cladistic analysis determining the relationship between the three populations. Such an analysis calculates which evolutionary tree implies the lowest number of evolutionary changes and therefore is the most likely. He assumed that this would result in a tree in which the types were successive branches. Such a tree would, as a consequence of the method used, never show a direct ancestor-descendant relationship. Many scientists believed such a relation could never be proven anyway. Horner disagreed: he saw the gradual morphological changes as clear proof that, in this case, the evolution of one taxon into another, without a splitting of the populations, could be directly observed. Evolutionists in general would be too hesitant to recognize this. Such a transition is called anagenesis; he posited that, if the opposite, cladogenesis, could not be proven, a scientist was free to assume an anagenetic process.

Basing himself on revised data, Sampson in 1995 estimated that the layers investigated represented a longer period of time than the initially assumed 500,000 years: after the deposition of Gilmore's Brachyceratops quarry, 860,000 years would have passed, and after the Einiosaurus beds 640,000 years, until the maximal extent of the Bearpaw transgression. He did not adopt Horner's hypothesis of anagenesis but assumed speciation took place, with the populations splitting. These time intervals were still short enough to indicate that the rate of speciation must have been high, which might have been true of all centrosaurines of the late Campanian.

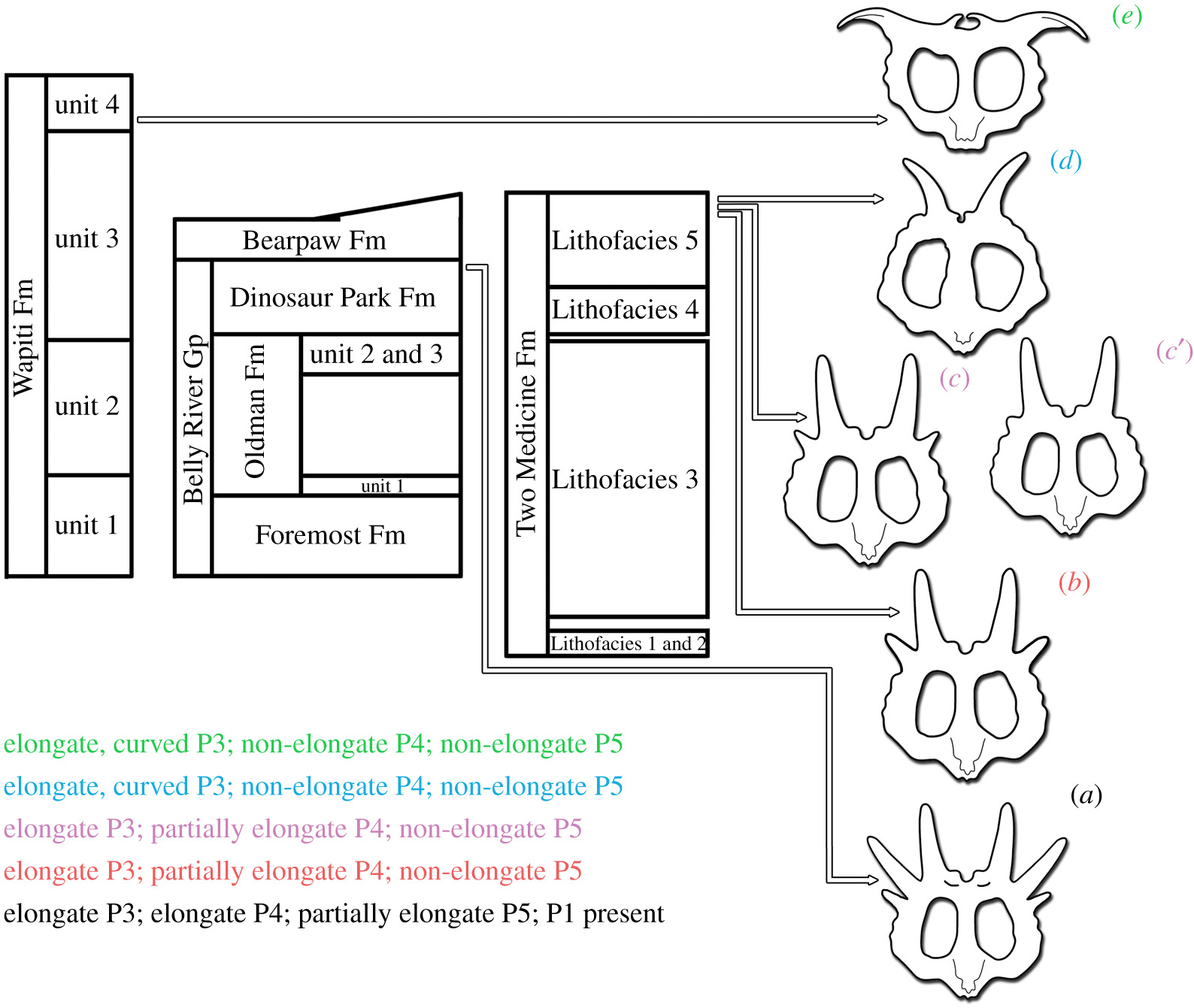
Stratigraphic and temporal relationship of taxa hypothesized as representing an anagenetic lineage by Wilson et al., 2020

In 1996, Dodson raised two objections to Horner's hypothesis. Firstly, the possession of just one pair of main spikes seemed more basal than the presence of three pairs, as with Styracosaurus albertensis. This suggested to him that the Einiosaurus–Achelousaurus lineage was a separate branch within the Centrosaurinae. Secondly, he was concerned that Einiosaurus and Achelousaurus were a case of sexual dimorphism, one type being the males, the other the females. This would be suggested by the short geological time interval between the layers their fossils had been found in, which was estimated by him at about 250,000 years. But if the hypothesis were true, it would be perhaps the best example of fast evolution in the Dinosauria.

In 2010, Horner admitted that specimen TMP 2002.76.1 seemed to indicate that Achelousaurus was not descended from Einiosaurus, as it preceded both in age, and yet had a nasal boss. But he stressed that even if the lineages split off, its ancestor might have resembled Einiosaurus. Furthermore, it might still be possible that Einiosaurus was a direct descendant of Rubeosaurus. Also, the process of rapid displacements and extinctions of species could in his opinion still be elegantly explained by a westward expansion of the Bearpaw Sea.

The process of anagenesis was affirmed by Wilson and Scannella in 2016, who studied the ontogenetic changes in horned dinosaurs. They compared a small Einiosaurus specimen, MOR 456 8-8-87-1, with Achelousaurus specimen MOR 591. Both proved to be quite similar, with the main differences being a longer face in MOR 456 8-8-87-1, and a sharper supraorbital horncore in MOR 591. They concluded that Achelousaurus was likely the direct descendant of Einiosaurus. The more adult Einiosaurus individuals approached the Achelousaurus morphology. The differences between the two taxa would have been caused by heterochrony – differential changes in the speed the various traits developed during the lifetime of an individual. Since Wilson and colleagues found in 2020 that Stellasaurus (Horner's "Taxon A") was intermediate between Styracosaurus and Einiosaurus in morphology and stratigraphy, they could not discount that it was a transitional taxon within an anagenetic lineage.

=== Classification ===
In 1995, Sampson formally placed Einiosaurus in the Ceratopsidae, more precisely the Centrosaurinae. In all analyses, Einiosaurus and Achelousaurus are part of the clade Pachyrhinosaurini. In 2010, Gregory S. Paul assigned E. procurvicornis to the genus Centrosaurus, as C. procurvicornis. This has found no acceptance among other researchers, with subsequent taxonomic assessments invariably keeping the generic name Einiosaurus.

=== Phylogeny ===
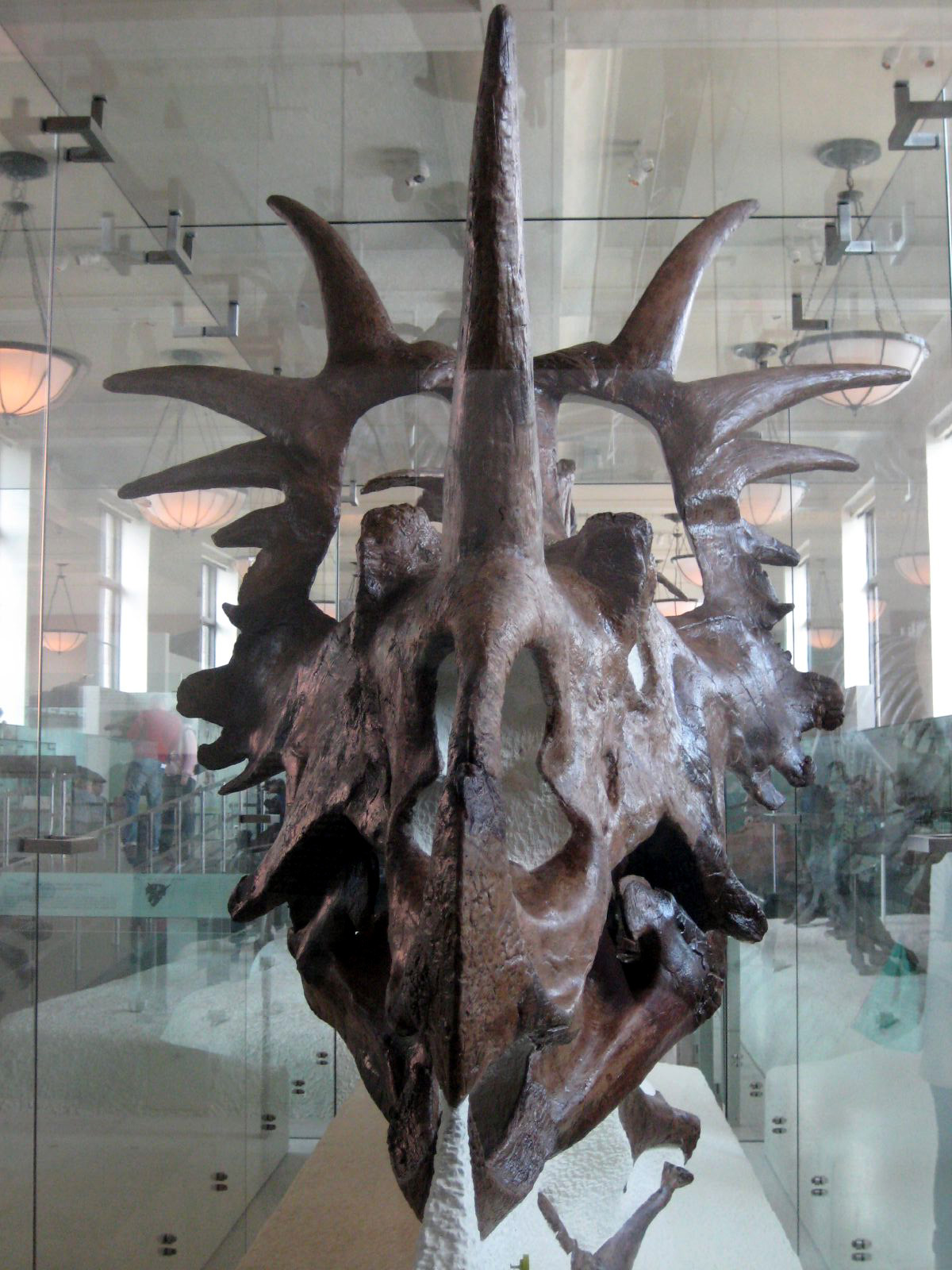
Phylogenetic analyses have varied in the closeness of the relationship between Einiosaurus and Styracosaurus; here, a skull at the American Museum of Natural History

Sampson felt, in 1995, that there was not enough evidence to conclude that Einiosaurus was a direct ancestor of Achelousaurus. Unlike Horner, he decided to perform a cladistic analysis to establish a phylogeny. This showed an evolutionary tree wherein Achelousaurus split off between Einiosaurus and Pachyrhinosaurus, as Horner had predicted. Contrary to Horner's claim, Styracosaurus albertensis could not have been a direct ancestor, as it was a sister species of Centrosaurus in Sampson's analysis.

Subsequent studies have sought to determine the precise relationships within this part of the evolutionary tree, with conflicting results regarding the question whether Styracosaurus albertensis or Einiosaurus might have been in the direct line of ascent to Achelousaurus. In 2005, an analysis by Michael Ryan and Anthony Russell found Styracosaurus more closely related to Achelousaurus than to Centrosaurus. This was confirmed by analyses by Ryan in 2007, Nicholas Longrich in 2010, and Xu et al. in 2010. The same year Horner and Andrew T. McDonald moved Styracosaurus ovatus to its own genus, Rubeosaurus, finding it a sister species of Einiosaurus, while Styracosaurus albertensis was again located on the Centrosaurus branch. They also assigned specimen MOR 492, the basis of "Taxon A", to Rubeosaurus. In 2011, a subsequent study by Andrew T. McDonald in this respect replicated the outcome of his previous one, as did a publication by Andre Farke et al. In 2017, J.P. Wilson and Ryan further complicated the issue, concluding that MOR 492 ("Taxon A") was not referable to Rubeosaurus and announcing that yet another genus would be named for it. Wilson and colleagues moved MOR 492 to the new genus Stellasaurus in 2020, which therefore corresponds to "Taxon A". Their study found Rubeosaurus ovatus to be the sister species of Styracosaurus albertensis, and concluded Rubeosaurus to be synonymous with Styracosaurus.

When Pachyrhinosaurus perotorum was described in 2012, the clade name Pachyrostra was coined, uniting Pachyrhinosaurus with Achelousaurus to the exclusion of Einiosaurus, the former two sharing derived traits (or synapomorphies) such as enlarged nasal ornamentation and a change of the nasal and brow horns into bosses. Also in 2012, the clade Pachyrhinosaurini was named, consisting of species more closely related to Pachyrhinosaurus or Achelousaurus than to Centrosaurus. Apart from Einiosaurus and Rubeosaurus, this included Sinoceratops and Xenoceratops, according to a 2013 study.

Cladistic analyses develop gradually, reflecting new discoveries and insights. Their results can be shown in a cladogram, with the relationships found ordered in an evolutionary tree. The cladogram below shows the phylogenetic position of Einiosaurus in a cladogram from Wilson and colleagues, 2020.

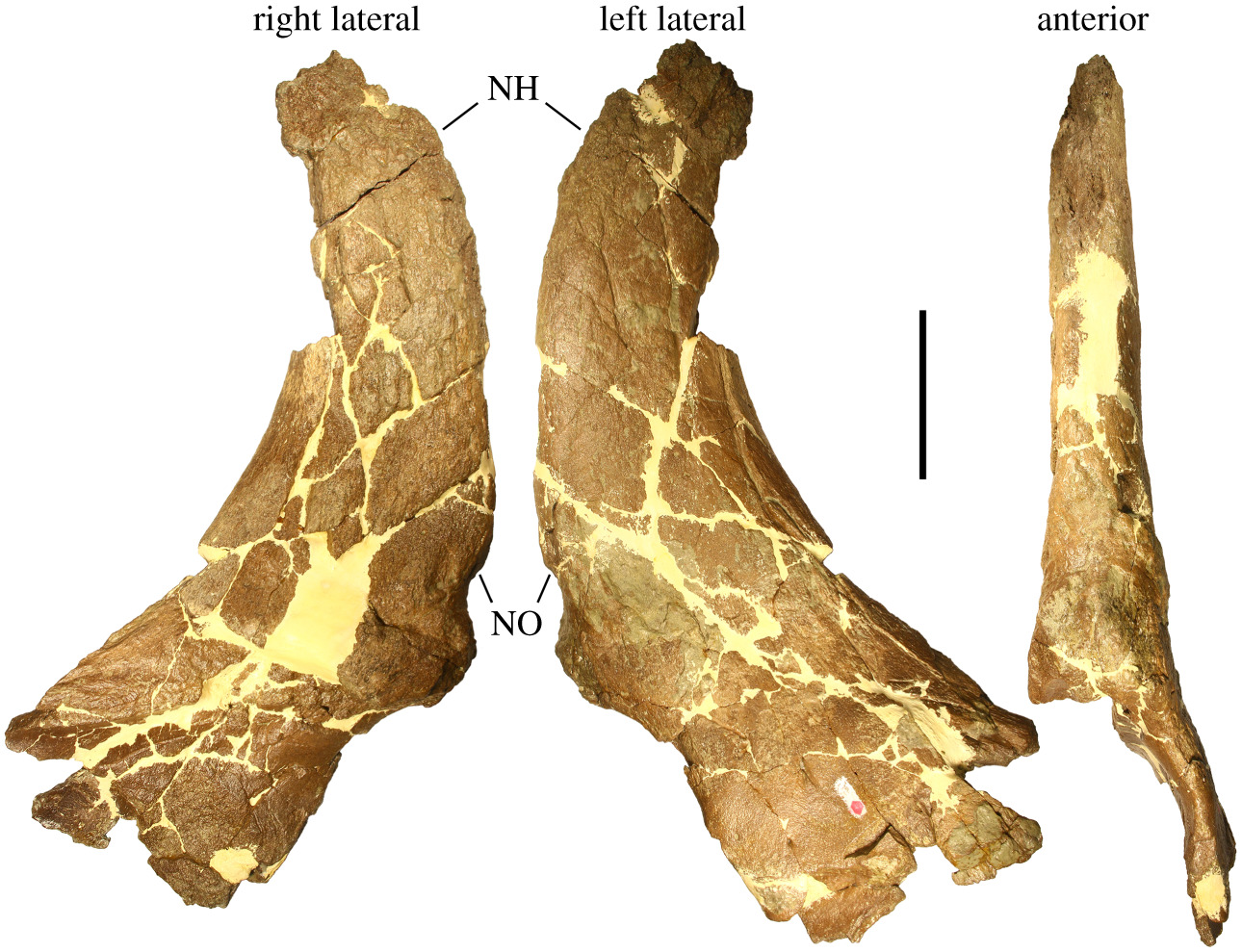
Nasal horn of Stellasaurus, the possible ancestor of Einiosaurus and Achelousaurus

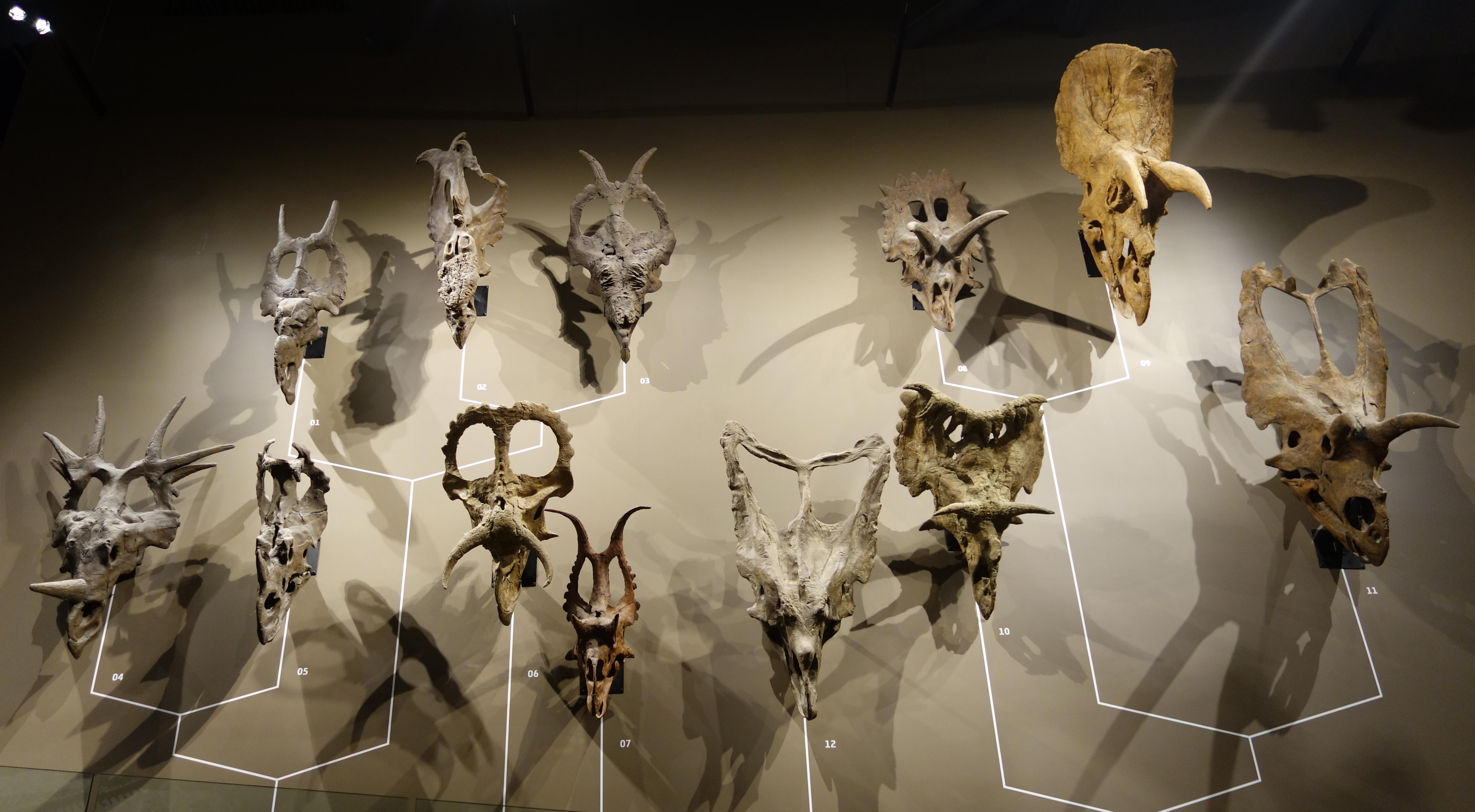
Ceratopsid skull casts positioned in a phylogenetic tree, in the Natural History Museum of Utah, with Einiosaurus first from the upper left row (number 01)

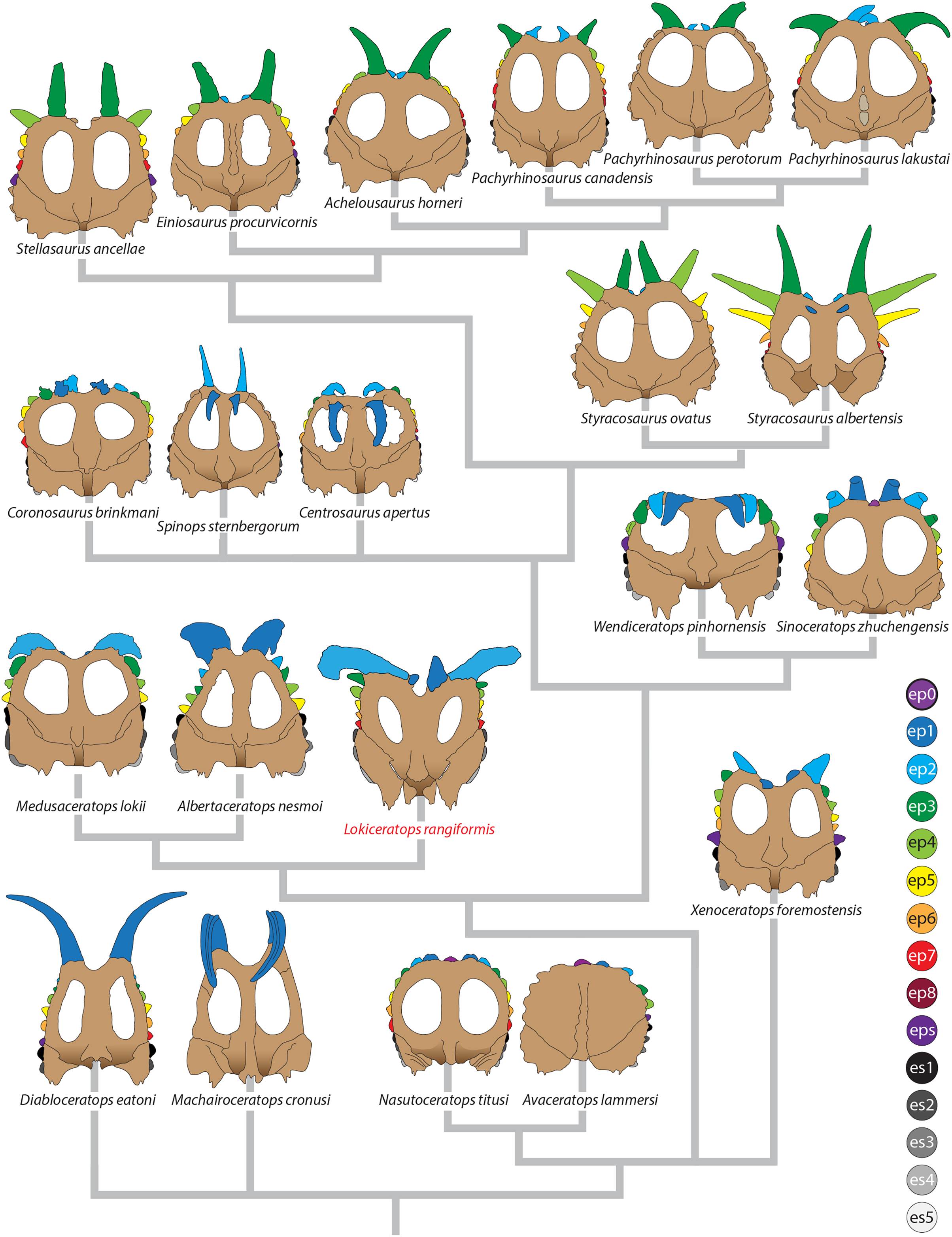
Comparison between neck-frills of centrosaurines known by 2024

- Centrosaurinae
  - - - Xenoceratops foremostensis
      - - Medusaceratops lokii
        - - Wendiceratops pinhornensis
          - Sinoceratops zhuchengensis
    - - - Machairoceratops cronusi
        - Diabloceratops eatoni
      - - Albertaceratops nesmoi
        - - Nasutoceratops titusi
          - Avaceratops lammersi
  - - - Spinops sternbergorum
      - - Centrosaurus apertus
        - Coronosaurus brinkmani
    - - - Styracosaurus ovatus
        - Styracosaurus albertensis
      - - Stellasaurus ancellae
        - - Einiosaurus procurvicornis
          - - Achelousaurus horneri
            - - Pachyrhinosaurus lakustai
              - - Pachyrhinosaurus perotorum
                - Pachyrhinosaurus canadensis

== Paleobiology ==
Like all ceratopsids, Einiosaurus had a complex dental battery capable of processing even the toughest plants. Einiosaurus lived in an inland habitat.

=== Function of skull ornamentation ===
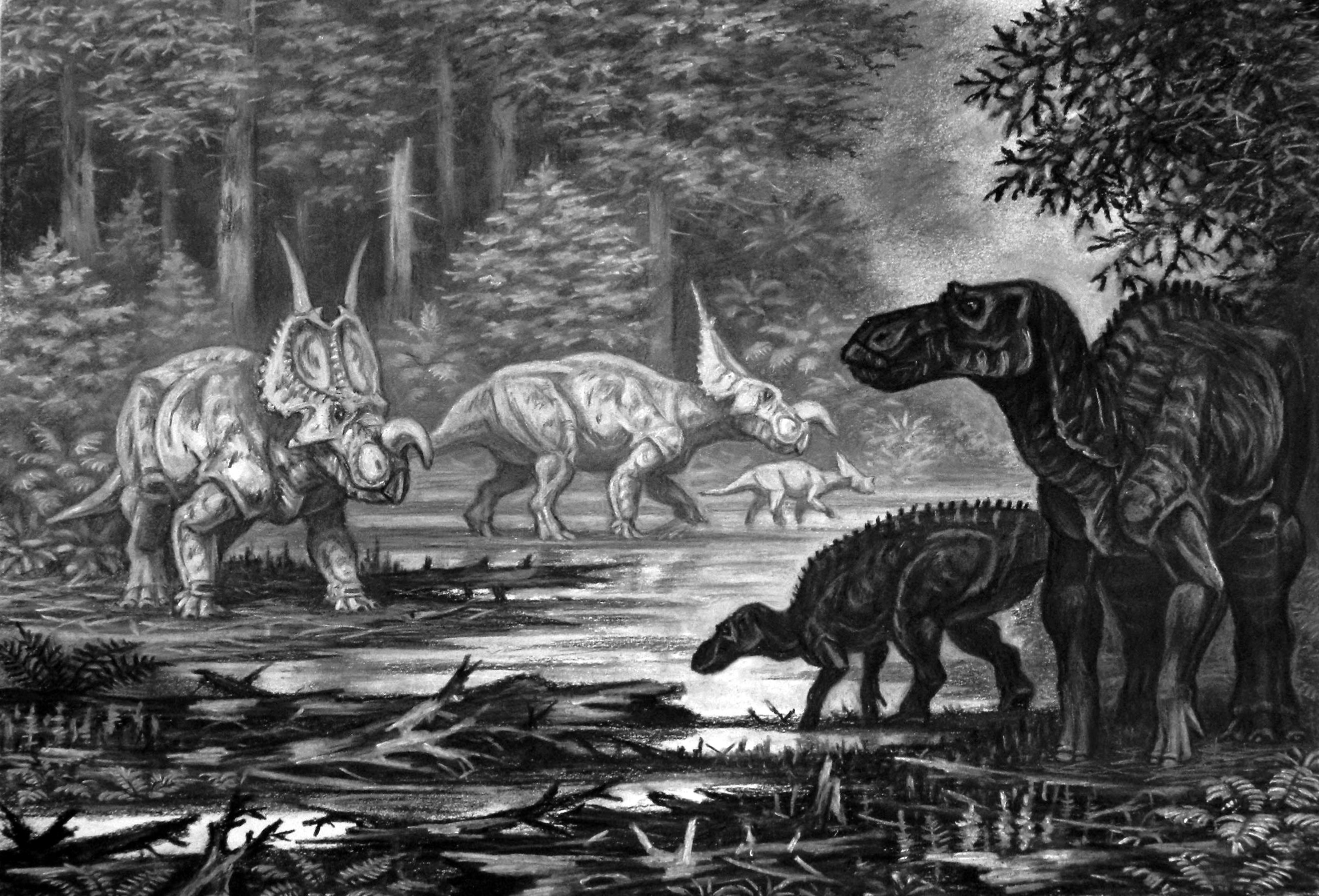
Restoration of Einiosaurus and Maiasaura in environment

In 1995, Sampson noted that earlier studies had found that the horns and frills of ceratopsians most likely had a function in intraspecific display and combat, and that these features would therefore have resulted from sexual selection for successful mating. Likewise, in 1997 Horner concluded that such ornamentation was used by males to establish dominance and that females would have preferred well-equipped males as their offspring would then inherit these traits, conferring a reproduction benefit. Dodson thought that in the Centrosaurinae in general the display value of the frill had been reduced compared to the nasal and supraorbital ornamentation. Sampson in 1995 rejected the possibility that the difference in skull ornamentation between Einiosaurus and Achelousaurus represented sexual dimorphism, for three reasons. Firstly, the extensive Einiosaurus bone beds did not contain any specimens with bosses, as would have been expected if one of the sexes had them. Secondly, Einiosaurus and Achelousaurus are found in strata of a different age. Thirdly, in a situation of sexual dimorphism usually only one of the sexes shows exaggerated secondary sexual characters. Einiosaurus and Achelousaurus however, each have developed a distinct set of such traits.

=== Social behavior ===
It has been claimed that ceratopsian dinosaurs were herding animals, due to the large number of known bone beds containing multiple members of the same ceratopsian species. In 2010, Hunt and Farke pointed out that this was mainly true for centrosaurine ceratopsians. Horner assumed that the horned dinosaurs at Landslide Butte lived in herds which had been killed by drought or disease.

Low-diversity and single-species bonebeds are thought to represent herds that may have died in catastrophic events, such as during a drought or flood. This is evidence that Einiosaurus, as well as other centrosaurine ceratopsians such as Pachyrhinosaurus and Centrosaurus, were herding animals similar in behavior to modern-day bison or wildebeest. In contrast, ceratopsine ceratopsids, such as Triceratops and Torosaurus, are typically found singly, implying that they may have been somewhat solitary in life, though fossilized footprints may provide evidence to the contrary.

=== Metabolism and growth ===
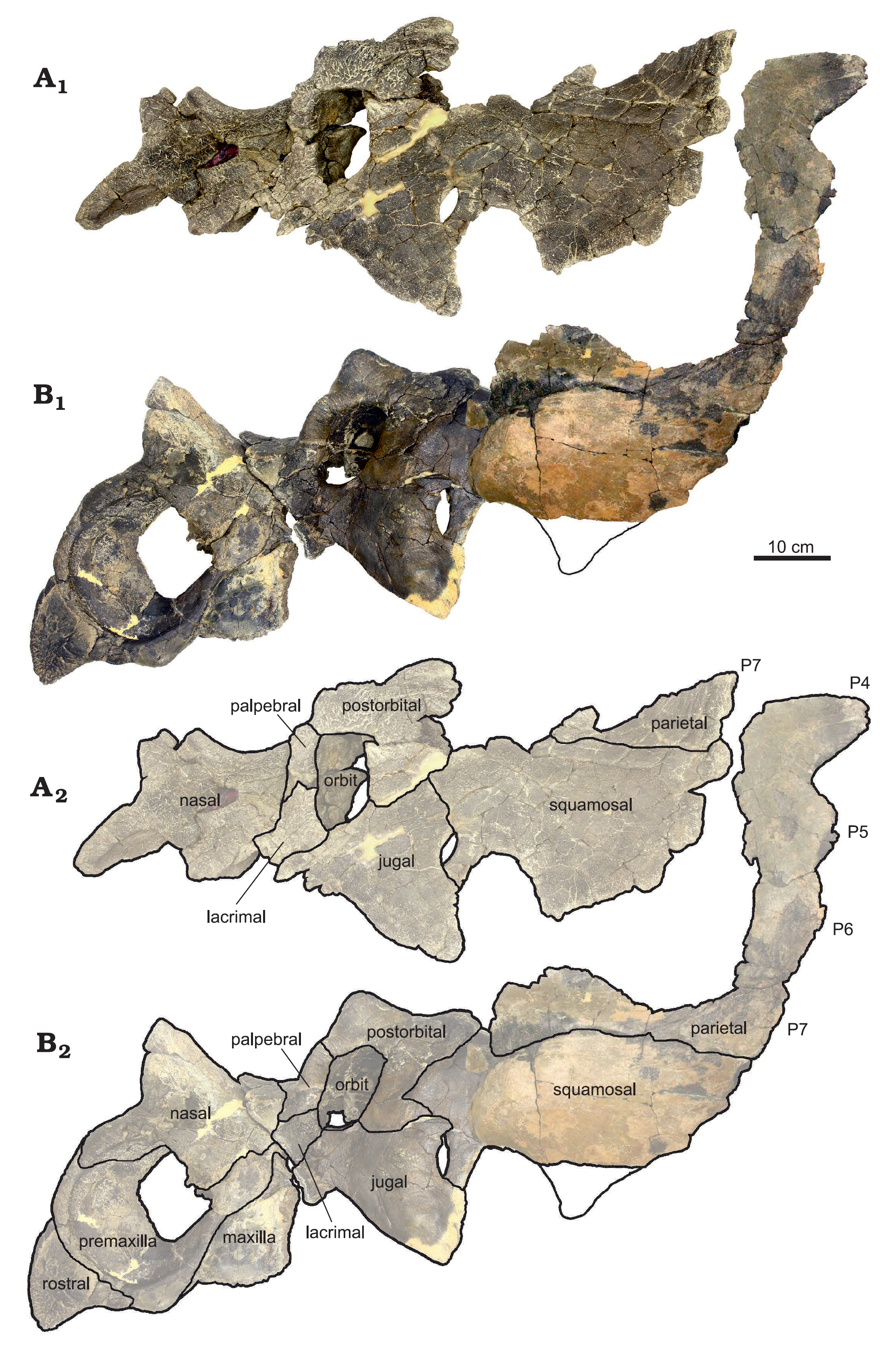
Subadult skulls of Einiosaurus (A, MOR 456 8-8-87-1) and possible Einiosaurus or Achelousaurus (B, MOR 591)

There has long been debate about the thermoregulation of dinosaurs, centered around whether they were ectotherms ("cold-blooded") or endotherms ("warm-blooded"). Mammals and birds are homeothermic endotherms, which generate their own body heat and have a high metabolism, whereas reptiles are heterothermic ectotherms, which receive most of their body heat from their surroundings. A 1996 study examined the oxygen isotopes from bone phosphates of animals from the Two Medicine Formation, including the juvenile Achelousaurus or Einiosaurus specimen MOR 591. δ^{18}O values of phosphate in vertebrate bones depend on the δ^{18}O values in their body water and the temperature when the bones were deposited, making it possible to measure fluctuations in temperature for each bone of an individual when they were deposited. The study analyzed seasonal variations in the body temperature and differences in temperature between skeletal regions, to determine whether the dinosaurs maintained their temperature seasonally. A varanid lizard fossil sampled for the study showed isotopic variation consistent with it being an heterothermic ectotherm. The variation of the dinosaurs, including MOR 591, was consistent with them being homeothermic endotherms. The metabolic rate of these dinosaurs was likely not as high as that of modern mammals and birds, and they may have been intermediate endotherms.

In 2010, a study by Julie Reizner of the individuals excavated at the Dino Ridge site concluded that Einiosaurus grew quickly until its third to fifth year of life after which growth slowed, probably at the onset of sexual maturity.

In 2021 a study, Wilson and Scannella pointed out that specimen MOR 591 was of a younger individual age than the Einiosaurus skull MOR 456 8-8-87-1, but of the same size. If MOR 591 could indeed be referred to Achelousaurus, this might indicate this genus reached its adult size more quickly.

== Paleoenvironment ==
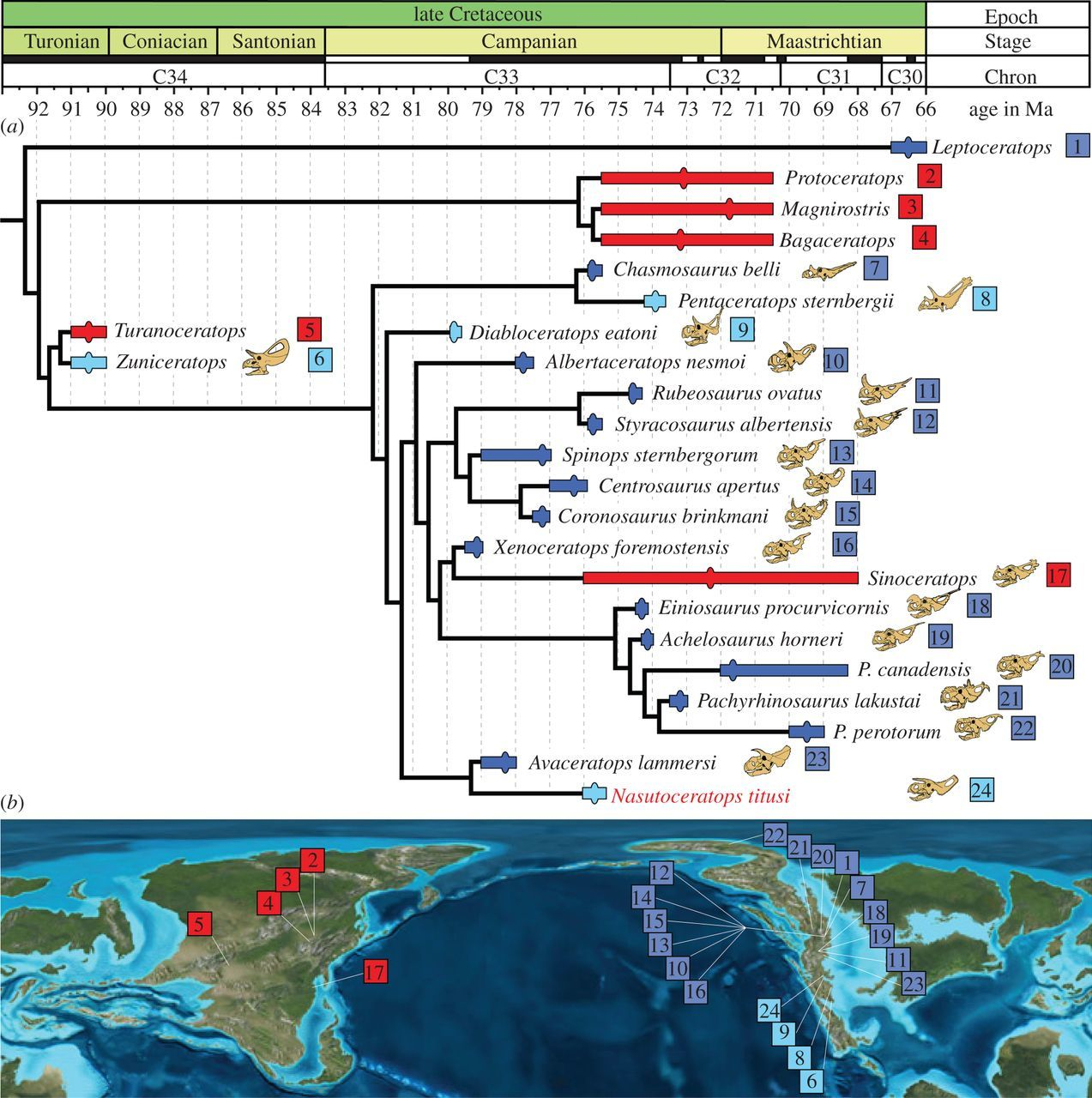
Time-calibrated phylogenetic relationships of Ceratopsidae (above), and paleogeographic map of the Late Cretaceous with distribution of ceratopsids (below), following Sampson and colleagues, 2013. Einiosaurus is 18

Einiosaurus is known from the Two Medicine Formation, which preserves coastal sediments dating from the Campanian stage of the Late Cretaceous Period, between 83 and 74 million years ago. The Two Medicine Formation is typified by a warm semiarid climate. Its layers were deposed on the east coast of the Laramidia island continent (which consisted of western North America). The high cordillera in the west, combined with predominantly western winds, would have caused a rain shadow, limiting annual rainfall. Rain would mainly have fallen during the summer, when convection storms flooded the landscape. The climate would thus also have been very seasonal, with a long dry season and a short wet season. Vegetation would have been sparse and a little varied. In such conditions, horned dinosaurs would have been dependent on oxbow lakes for a continuous supply of water and food – the main river channels tending to run dry earlier – and perished in them during severe droughts when the animals concentrated around the last watering holes, causing bone beds to form. The brown paleosol in which the horned dinosaurs were found – a mixture of clay and coalified wood fragments – resembles that of modern seasonally dry swamps. The surrounding vegetation might have consisted of about 25 m (80 ft) high conifer trees. Einiosaurus ate much smaller plants, though: a 2013 study determined that ceratopsid herbivores on Laramidia were restricted to feeding on vegetation with a height of 1 m (3.5 ft) or lower.

More or less contemporary dinosaur genera of the area included Prosaurolophus, Scolosaurus, Hypacrosaurus, and tyrannosaurids of uncertain classification. As proven by tooth marks, horned dinosaur fossils in the Landslide Butte Field Area had been scavenged by a large theropod predator, which Rogers suggested were Albertosaurus.

The exact composition of the fauna Einiosaurus was part of is uncertain, as its fossils have not been discovered in direct association with other taxa. According to Horner and colleagues in 1992, its intermediate anagenetic position suggests that Einiosaurus shared its habitat with forms roughly found in the middle of the time range of its formation. As with horned dinosaurs, Horner assumed he had found transitional taxa in other dinosaur groups of the Two Medicine Formation. One of these was a form in between Lambeosaurus and Hypacrosaurus; in 1994 he would name it Hypacrosaurus stebingeri. Today, Hypacrosaurus stebingeri is no longer seen as having evolved through anagenesis because autapomorphies of the species have been identified. Horner saw some pachycephalosaur skulls as indicative for a taxon in between Stegoceras and Pachycephalosaurus; these have not been consistently referred to a new genus. Finally, Horner thought there was a taxon present that was transitional between Daspletosaurus and Tyrannosaurus. In 2017, tyrannosaurid remains from the Two Medicine Formation were named as a new species of Daspletosaurus: Daspletosaurus horneri. The 2017 study considered it plausible that D. horneri was a direct descendant of D. torosus in a process of anagenesis, but rejected the possibility that D. horneri was the ancestor of Tyrannosaurus.

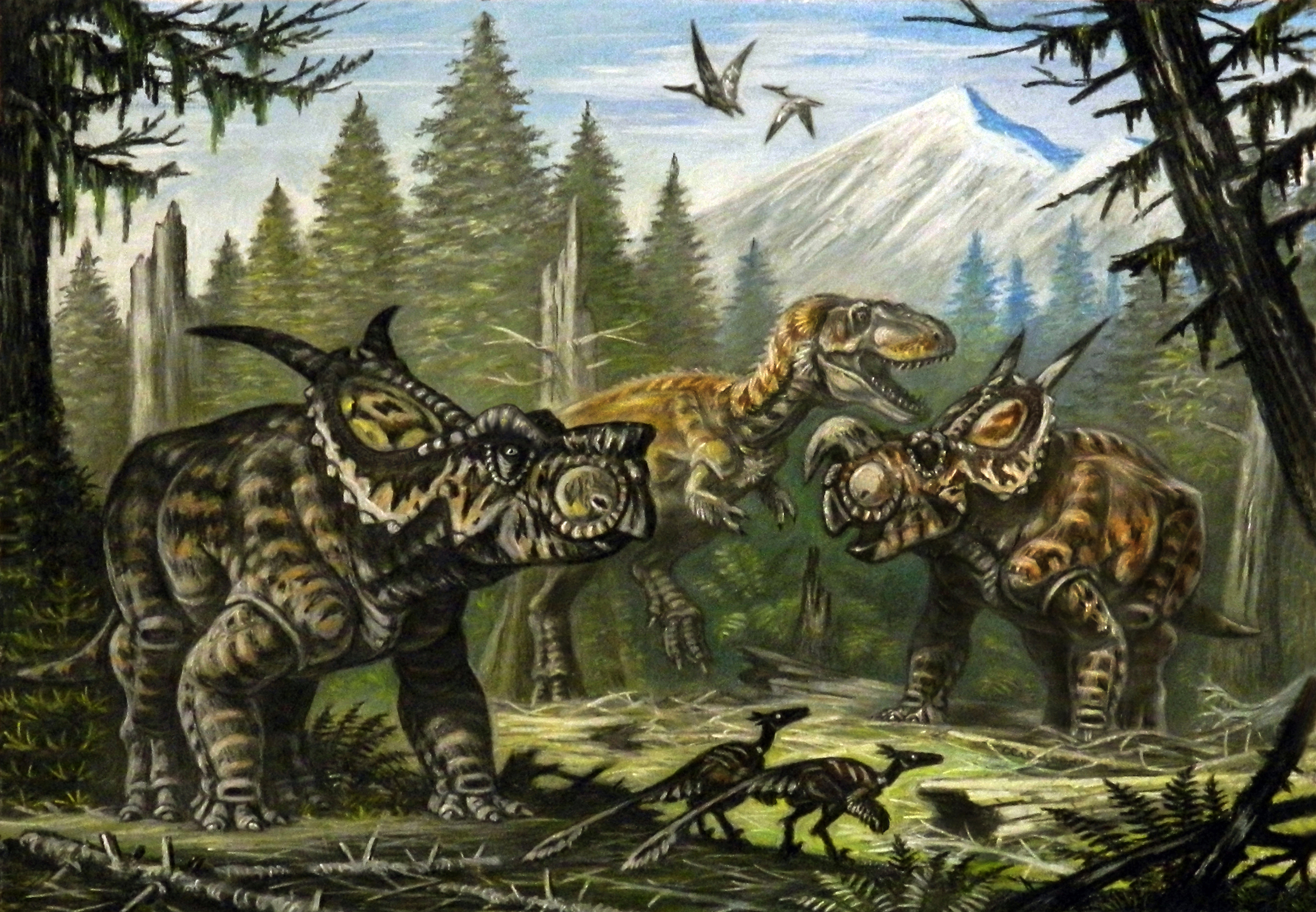
Restoration of Achelousaurus, Einiosaurus, and a tyrannosaur; it is uncertain whether the two ceratopsids were contemporaneous

Other ceratopsians from the Two Medicine Formation include Achelousaurus and Stellasaurus. In addition, remains of other indeterminate and dubious centrosaurines, including Brachyceratops, are known from the formation and though they may represent younger stages of the three valid genera, this is not possible to demonstrate. Whereas Horner assumed that Einiosaurus and Achelousaurus were separate in time, in 2010 Donald M. Henderson considered it possible that at least their descendants or ancestors were overlapping or sympatric and thus would have competed for food sources unless there had been niche partitioning. The skull of Achelousaurus was more than twice as strong than that of Einiosaurus in its bending strength and torsion resistance. This might have indicated a difference in diet to avoid competition. The bite strength of Einiosaurus, measured as an ultimate tensile strength, was 10.3 newtons per square millimeter (N/mm^{2}) at the maxillary tooth row and 6.40 N/mm^{2} at the beak. By comparison, it was 30.5 N per square millimeter (N/mm^{2}) and 18 N/mm^{2}, respectively, for Achelousaurus. Wilson and colleagues found in 2020 that since the Two Medicine centrosaurines were separated stratigraphically, they were therefore possibly not contemporaneous.

== See also ==
- Timeline of ceratopsian research
