= Carter County Museum =

Museum in Ekalaka, Montana, US

- Established: 1936
- Location: 306 N. Main Street, Ekalaka, Montana
- Coordinates: 45.8910°N 104.5465°W
- Type: Local history, natural history
- Website: cartercountymuseum.org

The Carter County Museum is a local and natural history museum located in Ekalaka, Montana. It was founded in 1936 and is the first county museum in Montana. The museum is one of several in the state on the Montana Dinosaur Trail, a collection of museums with unique paleontology displays.

The collections at the museum include a large dinosaur exhibit, a focus on natural history, ranch and homestead life, and a veteran's room that covers the people from the area that traveled to war since the founding of the county in 1917.

== Exhibits ==
=== Dinosaurs ===
Carter County contains part of the Hell Creek Formation, and many paleontologists visit the area each summer to look for more fossilized remains. Fossils from Carter County are found in many of the science museums in the country. The Carter County Museum itself contains several significant fossils, largely collected on private land in the 1930s and 1940s, including one of the most complete skeletons of Edmontosaurus annectens, as well as a complete Triceratops skull.

The dinosaur exhibits are rotated from the museum's stored collections.

=== Local and natural history ===
Aside from dinosaurs, there is also significant exhibit space given to other later animals and geological features. The museum also hosts a wide range of exhibits including a firearms display, old equipment from early in the life of Ekalaka, pictures of towns that lived and died in the past century, and flavors of life for the thousands of early homesteaders who tried to make a living on the dry land.

== Dino Shindig ==
Established in 2013, the annual Dino Shindig is a gathering of paleontologists, dinosaur enthusiasts, and community members for a weekend of lectures, kids activities, field expeditions, live music and more. Previous lecturers have included Kirk Johnson and Jack Horner. This event is held on the last weekend of July and is attended by people from around the globe.
