= How to Build a Dinosaur =

2009 book

- Authors: Jack Horner; James Gorman
- Language: English
- Genre: Science
- Publisher: Dutton Penguin (first edition); Plume (paperback edition)
- Publication date: March 19, 2009 (first edition); February 23, 2010 (paperback edition)
- Publication place: United States
- Pages: 246
- ISBN: 0525951040

How to Build a Dinosaur: Extinction Doesn't Have to Be Forever is a 2009 book by paleontologist Jack Horner and James Gorman. The book outlines Horner's theory for being able to resurrect a maniraptoran dinosaur by altering the genes of a chicken embryo. In 2010, a paperback version was published under the title How to Build a Dinosaur: The New Science of Reverse Evolution.

== Summary ==
Paleontologist Jack Horner describes evolutionary developmental biology (evo-devo) and outlines his theory for being able to resurrect a maniraptoran dinosaur from a chicken embryo, by activating and deactivating certain genes to restore dormant dinosaur characteristics such as a tail, claws, teeth, and a snout. Horner also discusses paleontology in the book.

== Background and publication ==
Horner's idea for the "Chickenosaurus" project came from "a pretty good script" that was written for Jurassic Park IV early in its development. The film's story, at that time, was expected to involve genetic engineering of dinosaurs. Horner was planning the book with co-author James Gorman in spring 2005. Gorman was deputy science editor for The New York Times, and had previously co-written Horner's 1990 book, Digging Dinosaurs.

Horner and his publisher planned for the book to come out at the same time as Jurassic Park IV, to serve as a scientific companion volume; however, the film was delayed. Horner's book, in hardcover form, was ultimately published by Dutton Penguin on March 19, 2009, without the accompaniment of the film. The book was initially published with the title How to Build a Dinosaur: Extinction Doesn't Have to Be Forever. A paperback version was published by Plume on February 23, 2010, with the title How to Build a Dinosaur: The New Science of Reverse Evolution.

== Reception ==
Publishers Weekly called the book "provocative but frustrating", writing that aside from the main concept, "Much of the rest of the book offers background, but often digresses, for example, into hunting for DNA from 68-million-year-old dinosaur bones or the surfing habit of the man who discovered the polymerase chain reaction or how genetically close humans and Neanderthals are—none of which advances the book's central argument."

Kirkus Reviews wrote that the book "has a comfortable, intelligent flow," but noted that Horner first "wants to tell a story—and it's a good one, though at times meandering—about paleontology […]. Horner digresses about skinheads, Ted Kaczynski and chicken carcasses, but his main idea is reverse evolutionary engineering." Gilbert Taylor of Booklist wrote, "Straight from the scientific frontier, Horner's work should excite anyone who's dreamed of walking with dinosaurs."

Riley Black, writing for Smithsonian said, "The importance of How to Build a Dinosaur does not lie in Horner's wish to create a dinochicken. That makes up only a small part of the book. Instead the slim volume indicates how paleontology is becoming more of an interdisciplinary science where studies of development and genetics are just as important as fossilized bones." Jeff Hecht of New Scientist wrote that Horner "is at his best" in the book, which he called "provocative yet firmly grounded in science."
