= Bob Makela =

American paleontologist

- Born: Robert Raymond Makela; 20 March 1940; Kemmerer, Wyoming, U.S.
- Died: 26 June 1987 (aged 47); North of Cut Bank, Montana
- Education: University of Montana
- Known for: Discovery of dinosaur nesting behavior and parental care (Maiasaura); Discovery of genus Brontotholus (named by Woodruff et al.); Discovery of genus Orodromeus (named by J. Horner); Discovery of Ceratopsian remains at Dino Ridge Quarry, containing dinosaur genera such as Achelousaurus and Einiosaurus
- Spouse: Doris M. Makela (1940, née Johnson)
- Children: 2, James and Jay Makela
- Scientific career
- Fields: Paleontology
- Workplaces: Blue Sky High School (Note: Makela taught science and computers at Blue Sky High School in Rudyard, Montana. In 2005, thus many years after his death, Blue Sky and Kremlin-Gildford high schools consolidated into present-day North Star High School (Montana), not to be confused with North Star High School (Pennsylvania).) (Rudyard, Montana); Society of Vertebrate Paleontology; Museum of the Rockies

Robert Raymond Makela (Finnish: [ˈmækelæ], 20 March 1940 – 26 June 1987), known as Bob Makela, was an American paleontologist who described Maiasaura alongside fellow paleontologist and college buddy Jack Horner, providing the first clear evidence that some non-avian dinosaurs cared for their young.

== Biography ==
Bob Makela was born in Kemmerer (Wyoming) from John Alfred Mäkelä (1906-1970, born in Montana, of Finnish descent) and Ila M. Mäkelä (1910 – 1985, née Danley, born in Missouri). He grew up in Great Falls, Montana and attended Great Falls High School, where he graduated in 1958.

After having spent one year at the University of Montana in Missoula, Makela served three years at the U.S. Army, then went back to Missoula. Back to the University of Montana, he graduated in 1969 with a Bachelor of Science in secondary education (with a biology minor). The same year in Missoula, on November 14th, Makela married Doris M. Johnson. Both husband and wife found jobs teaching at Rudyard's high school in 1970 (named "Blue Sky High School" at the time). They had two children, James Makela and Jay Makela.

In the mid-1960s and onwards, Makela and old college buddy Jack Horner started exploring Montana fossil sites during the summers.

== Scientific career ==
Alongside his paleontological prospectings and excavations in Montana, Bob Makela had joined numerous scientific organisations, including the Montana State Science Teacher's Association and the Society of Vertebrate Paleontology. In 1985 he attended the National Science Foundation convention, the National Geographic convention and was one of the finalists for Montana's Presidential Scientist Award.

In 1978, Bob Makela and friend Jack Horner went to Bynum and learned that Marion Brandvold spent many years trying to put together the bones of small animals that she and her husband John Brandvold had been finding on a site close to their house. Horner identified the remains as baby dinosaurs and this led to both paleontologists to discover a new entire colonial nesting site: nests, eggs (some containing embryos, the first ever discovered in the field of dinosaur research), adults and juveniles. Identified as a new species of Hadrosaur, Makela and Horner named and described Maiasaura peeblesorum in 1979. Within a few years the site earned the name Egg Mountain because of the number of eggshell remains.

In 1983 Makela became officially involved in research for the Museum of the Rockies (Bozeman, Montana) which granted him to be the camp manager on academic dinosaur excavation sites.

As for the Egg Mountain discovery, it was Makela who first alerted Horner to the presence of what appeared to be an important paleontological site near Choteau, Montana. As quoted from The New York Times (1986):

Some of Mr. Horner's dedicated associates have worked with him ever since his days at Princeton in the late 1970's. Among them is Robert Makela, a Rudyard, Mont., high school teacher who spends his summers hunting dinosaurs. It was Mr. Makela's discovery of some unusual duckbill dinosaur bones in the 1970's that led to a series of Horner expeditions culminating in the identification of the Maiasaur nests with their associated baby dinosaurs and fossilized eggs. Computerized axial tomography (CAT) images of some of these eggs revealed that they contained fossilized dinosaur embryos. But Mr. Makela's worth to the team extends far beyond his sharp eyes and knowledge of bones, which have placed his name next to that of Mr. Horner on several important scientific papers. Mr. Makela, a strong man who wears a dinosaur tooth hanging from a string around his neck, is a talented builder of improvised shelters, of hand carts for rolling large fossils down the sides of cliffs, and of makeshift shower baths. He is also the team's most highly regarded pancake chef.

— Malcolm W. Browne, "Dinosaur Hunters Turn Up Clues to Care of the Reptiles' Young", The New York Times (August 26, 1986)

Other dinosaur discoveries of Makela, though not named by him, include Brontotholus (named by Woodruff et al.) Orodromeus (named by J. Horner) and Ceratopsians of the Dino Ridge Quarry such as Achelousaurus and Einiosaurus (both named by S. D. Sampson). Einiosaurus procurvicornis had been first informally named "Styracosaurus makeli", in honor of Makela. In 1988 Jack Horner and David B. Weishampel named Orodromeus makelai in his memory.

== In media ==
In 1987, shortly before his death, Makela appeared in the television documentary film Digging Dinosaurs produced by the television channel WHYY Philadelphia with fund by the William Penn Foundation. He is seen talking and pointing out to the camera a layer of sediment containing the eggs of a then unknown species of dinosaur.

== Road accident and death ==
On 26th June, 1987, while driving a pickup truck in order to bring excavation tools to a recently discovered dinosaur site located North of Cut Bank, Montana, Makela's pickup left the roadway and rolled several times. He died at the place of the accident at the age of 47.
