= Montana Dinosaur Trail =

Series of paleontological attractions

The Montana Dinosaur Trail is a series of fourteen dinosaur-themed museums, state parks and other attractions in twelve communities located in the central and eastern regions of the state of Montana in the United States of America. The trail, a plan to increase attendance at the region's museums and drive tourism in general, was established via the work of a number of museums as well as community and state officials. The idea for a trail uniting the museums and promoting tourism in eastern Montana came from a meeting of the Missouri River Country board of directors at the Dinosaur Field Station in Malta, Montana and the trail was officially launched via the efforts of the tourism groups of: Custer Country, Missouri River Country, Russell Country and Yellowstone Country; two state agencies: Fish, Wildlife and Parks and Travel Montana; and two federal agencies: the Army Corps of Engineers and the Bureau of Land Management.

The Dinosaur Trail opened in May 2005 and drew more than 196,000 visitors its first year. Since its opening, the trail facilities have hosted between 236,000 and 302,000 visitors each year. Promotion of the Trail includes a "Prehistoric Passport" on which visitors collect dinosaur icon stamps from each museum they visit. In addition to the participating museums, the trail has helped increase visitors to other small businesses along the route.

== Participating organizations ==
The fourteen organizations that make up the Montana Dinosaur Trail are the following:

- Blaine County Museum
- Carter County Museum
- Fort Peck Interpretive Center
- Garfield County Museum
- Great Plains Dinosaur Museum and Field Station
- H. Earl Clack Memorial Museum
- Makoshika State Park
- Museum of the Rockies
- Old Trail Museum
- Phillips County Museum
- Rudyard Depot Museum
- Montana Dinosaur Center
- Upper Musselshell Museum
