= Terrell Bynum =

Terrell Bynum may refer to:

- Terrell Bynum (American football) (born 1998), American football player
- Terrell Ward Bynum (born 1941), American philosopher
