= Raymond R. Rogers =

Raymond Robert Rogers is a professor and chair of geology at Macalester College. He earned his B.S. in geology from Northern Arizona University in 1985, his M.S. from the University of Montana in 1989, and his Ph.D. from the University of Chicago in 1995 Rogers' specializations are as a sedimentary geologist and taphonomist, with a focus on the study of terrestrial and marginal marine depositional systems, particularly those with abundant fossils. He is one of the editors of the book Bonebeds: Genesis, Analysis, and Paleobiological Significance, from the University of Chicago Press (2008).
