= Bynum, Montana =

- Census-designated place & Unincorporated community (CDP)
- Location within Montana Location within the United States
- Coordinates: 47°58′05″N 112°18′59″W
- Country: United States
- State: Montana
- County: Teton

Area
  - Total: 1.63 sq mi (4.22 km^{2})
  - Land: 1.63 sq mi (4.22 km^{2})
  - Water: 0 sq mi (0.00 km^{2})
- Elevation: 3,977 ft (1,212 m)

Population (2020)
  - Total: 28
  - Density: 17.2/sq mi (6.64/km^{2})
- Time zone: UTC-7 (Mountain (MST))
  - Summer (DST): UTC-6 (MDT)
- Area code: 406
- GNIS feature ID: 2583794

Bynum is an unincorporated community and census-designated place in Teton County, Montana, United States, approximately 13 miles north of Choteau. As of the 2020 census, Bynum had a population of 28.

Bynum is the site of a one-room country school, a general store, post office, an agate shop, and the Montana Dinosaur Center, which provides displays and educational programs about dinosaurs.

The town's name is derived from the surname of a family of early settlers in the area. The post office was established in 1885. In 1908 work on the Bynum Reservoir began.

In 2017, the NBC Today Show produced a segment highlighting Bynum's school and its tradition of starting each school day with a song and a dance.

== Climate ==
Climate data for Bynum, Montana, 1991–2020 normals
Month	Jan	Feb	Mar	Apr	May	Jun	Jul	Aug	Sep	Oct	Nov	Dec	Year
Mean daily maximum °F (°C)	36.0 (2.2)	35.8 (2.1)	43.6 (6.4)	51.3 (10.7)	61.6 (16.4)	70.5 (21.4)	80.3 (26.8)	79.3 (26.3)	69.6 (20.9)	55.0 (12.8)	43.0 (6.1)	34.5 (1.4)	55.0 (12.8)
Daily mean °F (°C)	25.2 (−3.8)	25.5 (−3.6)	32.2 (0.1)	40.3 (4.6)	50.2 (10.1)	58.5 (14.7)	66.2 (19.0)	65.4 (18.6)	56.4 (13.6)	43.5 (6.4)	33.1 (0.6)	25.4 (−3.7)	43.5 (6.4)
Mean daily minimum °F (°C)	14.3 (−9.8)	15.2 (−9.3)	20.7 (−6.3)	29.2 (−1.6)	38.8 (3.8)	46.5 (8.1)	52.1 (11.2)	51.4 (10.8)	43.2 (6.2)	32.0 (0.0)	23.1 (−4.9)	16.3 (−8.7)	31.9 (0.0)
Average precipitation inches (mm)	0.60 (15)	0.43 (11)	1.06 (27)	2.11 (54)	2.64 (67)	2.49 (63)	1.55 (39)	1.32 (34)	1.19 (30)	1.02 (26)	0.49 (12)	0.44 (11)	15.34 (389)
Source: NOAA

== Demographics ==
Historical population
Census	Pop.	Note	%±
2010	31		—
2020	28		−9.7%
U.S. Decennial Census
