= Jack Horner (paleontologist) =

American paleontologist

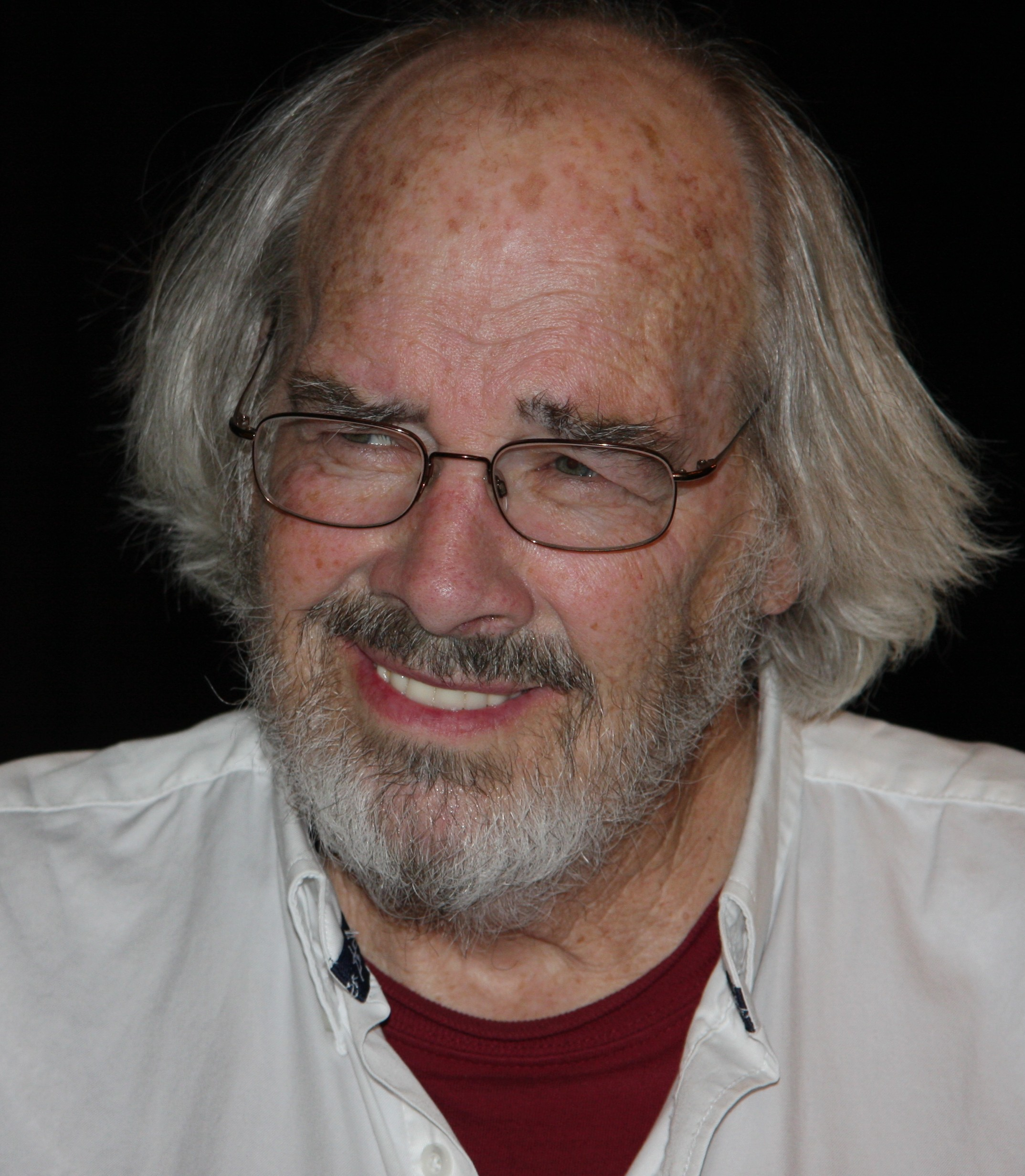
- Horner in 2015
- Born: John Robert Horner; June 15, 1946 (age 80); Shelby, Montana, U.S.
- Education: University of Montana
- Known for: Discovery of dinosaur nesting behavior and parental care (Maiasaura); Dinosaur ontogeny and taxonomy research; Consultant for Jurassic Park films
- Spouses: Virginia Lee Seacotte (1972-1982); Joann Katherine Raffelson (1986-1994); Celeste Claire Roach (1995-2005); Vanessa Weaver (2012-2016)
- Children: 1 (Jason James Horner, from Lee Seacotte)
- Awards: MacArthur Fellowship (1986); New York Academy of Sciences Children's Science Book Award (1989); Golden Plate Award (1993); Romer-Simpson Medal (2013)
- Scientific career
- Fields: Paleontology
- Workplaces: Princeton University (1975-1982); Museum of the Rockies (1982-2016); Montana State University (1982-2016); Burke Museum of Natural History and Culture (2016); Chapman University (2016-2026)

John Robert Horner (born June 15, 1946) is an American paleontologist best known for his research on dinosaurs. Horner has made a career as a researcher and teacher, having worked at various scientific institutions regardless of an initial lack of a university-level degree. In 1979, Horner and fellow paleontologist Bob Makela described for the first time the duck-billed dinosaur Maiasaura. Their research on Maiasaura provided the first clear evidence that some non-avian dinosaurs cared for their young.

Horner has gained popularity among the public as a figure of authority within the field of paleontology, he has published over 100 professional papers, has authored 12 books, numerous articles, and featured in numerous documentaries. He has raised controversy too, leading him, twice in his life, to depart prestigious scientific institutions. In particular, in 2016, he quit (and retired from) the Montana State University and the Museum of the Rockies after having married in 2012, when he was 65, a 19-year old undergraduate student, 46 years his junior, and in 2026 he quit his employment at Chapman University when early that same year it was publicly unveiled that he was mentioned in the Epstein files.

Horner served as the technical advisor for the first five Jurassic Park films, which greatly contributed to increase his popularity. He served as a partial inspiration for one of the lead characters of the Jurassic Park franchise (Dr. Alan Grant), and he even had a cameo appearance in one of the franchise's films, Jurassic World, in 2015.

== Early life and education ==
Horner was born on June 15, 1946 to John Horner, the owner of a sand-and-gravel business, and Miriam Horner (née Whitted), and raised in Shelby, Montana. He has a brother, Jim Horner, and a younger sister, Rosemary Horner. Horner acquired the nickname "Jack" at an early age. He was 8 years old when he found his first dinosaur bone.

Due to severe dyslexia (though he didn't learn about his condition until 1976, when he was already working at Princeton University) he struggled throughout his high school career at Shelby High School, but managed to graduate in 1964. That same year, he enrolled at the University of Montana where he majored in geology and zoology. Having failed his first year, Horner left the university in 1965 and was drafted by the United States Marine Corps. He served in the Vietnam War from 1966 to 1968. Immediately upon his return from Vietnam, he reapplied at the University of Montana. However, he was held back by various required courses, and flunked out again. Between 1964 and 1973, Horner flunked out of the University of Montana seven times before abandoning his pursuit of a university degree. After this, he helped run the family sand-and-gravel business for two years, during which he regularly sent letters to scientific institutions looking for a job, until he was admitted as a preparator at Princeton University (New Jersey) in 1975.

== Scientific career ==
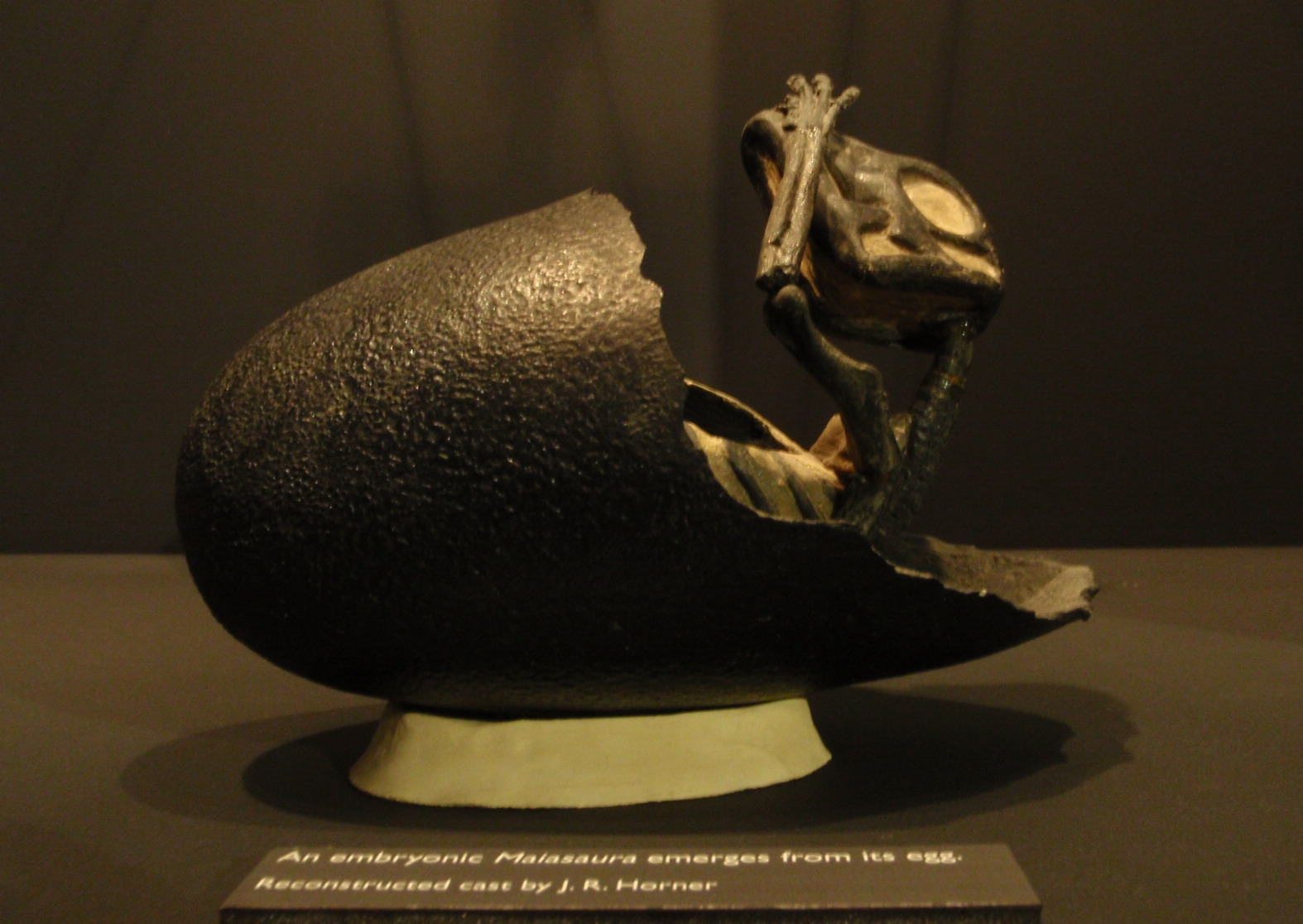
Reconstructed cast by Horner of a Maiasaura emerging from its egg

At the time of his first professional scientific employment at Princeton, Horner already had years of experience prospecting for fossiliferous sites with his research partner and friend Bob Makela since the mid 1960s. While Horner was working at Princeton, he and Makela kept prospecting together in north-western Montana during the Summers. In 1978, they discovered a colonial nesting site of a new dinosaur genus near Choteau, Montana, which they named Maiasaura, or "good mother lizard". The dinosaur bones, originating from a juvenile, were first discovered by Marion Brandvold. Horner then studied the bones and refused to return the bones to Brandvold, eventually leading to a suit against Horner and Yale University. It turned out that the discovered site also contained the first non-avian dinosaur eggs ever discovered in the Western Hemisphere, the first dinosaur embryos, and settled questions of whether some dinosaurs were social, built nests and cared for their young. Because of the quantity of dinosaur eggs and eggshell pieces it contained, the site ended up with the nickname "Egg Mountain".

In the late 1970s Princeton closed its paleontology department, which led to Horner joining the Academy of Natural Sciences of Philadelphia for a few years. In 1982, he left Princeton and Philadelphia for Montana State University (MSU) and the Museum of the Rockies (MOR), where he was hired both as a curator and a teacher. Not having obtained a PhD, Horner normally would not have been allowed to teach at MSU, but he received clearance for teaching at higher-education level through the support of Mick Hager, the director of the Museum of the Rockies at that time, and the implementation of the Experimental Program to Stimulate Competitive Research (EPSCoR), which allowed him to obtain the necessary grants.

Horner left MSU and the MOR on 30 June 2016 after more than 33 years with the institution, although he claims to have been pushed out after having married an undergraduate student 46 years his junior. That same year, Horner agreed to be a part-time research associate at the Burke Museum of Natural History and Culture to help "fill the museum up with dinosaurs". He started teaching as a Presidential Fellow at Chapman University in Orange, California, that same year. His employment with Chapman University ended in early 2026, although it is unclear whether this split was caused by the controversy surrounding his connections with Jeffrey Epstein.

=== Paleontological research ===
Within the paleontological community, Horner is best known for his research on the topic of dinosaur growth. He has published numerous articles in collaboration with Berkeley paleontologist Kevin Padian and French dinosaur histologist Armand de Ricqlès on the topic through the analysis of growth series. This usually involves leg bones of various sizes from individuals ranging in age from embryos to adults. Horner also revitalized the contested theory that Tyrannosaurus rex was an obligate scavenger, rather than a predatory killer. While this theory has been widely discussed by the popular press, it has never been a major research focus for Horner. He claimed that he never published the scavenger hypothesis in the peer-reviewed scientific literature, stating that it was mainly a tool for him to teach a popular audience, particularly children, of the dangers of making assumptions in science without using evidence.

After Maiasaura in 1979, Horner named several other species of dinosaur, including Orodromeus makelai, which he named in memory of his late friend Bob Makela, who had died in a car accident in 1987. He has had three named after himself: Achelousaurus horneri, Anasazisaurus horneri, and Daspletosaurus horneri. Horner has published over 100 professional papers, twelve books, and numerous articles. He was the Curator of Paleontology at the Museum of the Rockies, the Regent's Professor of Paleontology, adjunct curator at the National Museum of Natural History, and taught at Montana State University in Bozeman, Montana. Over the years he has advised people who have gone on to be leading experts in paleontology, such as Mary Higby Schweitzer, Greg Erickson, Kristi Curry-Rogers, and David J. Varricchio.

In 2003, Horner discovered a fossilized tyrannosaur leg bone from which paleontologist Mary Higby Schweitzer was able to retrieve proteins in 2007. From 2006 onwards, Horner has also studied the developmental biology of the so-called "parrot-like dinosaurs" (relatives of Psittacosaurus), based on 67 individuals discovered together at the same site in Mongolia. In 2009, the National Geographic Society released a documentary entitled "Dinosaurs Decoded", which reviews Horner's research into juvenile dinosaurs. He suggests that juvenile dinosaurs looked sufficiently different from adults, and that they have sometimes been mistaken for separate species. The program examines specific changes that occurred as dinosaurs aged and speculates on why the changes were necessary. Horner's research on the topic has gone as far as to suggest that Torosaurus, Dracorex & Stygimoloch, and Nanotyrannus are actually growth stages of Triceratops, Pachycephalosaurus, and Tyrannosaurus, respectively. Horner also believes that if his research were to continue as much as a third of known dinosaurs would be classified under an existing species.

On his retirement from Montana State University on July 1, 2016, the MacMillan Foundation honored Horner for his work with a $3 million endowment for the John R. Horner Curator of Paleontology Chair for the Museum of the Rockies/ Montana State University - funding the work of his Paleontology successors in perpetuity.

=== Build a dinosaur project ===
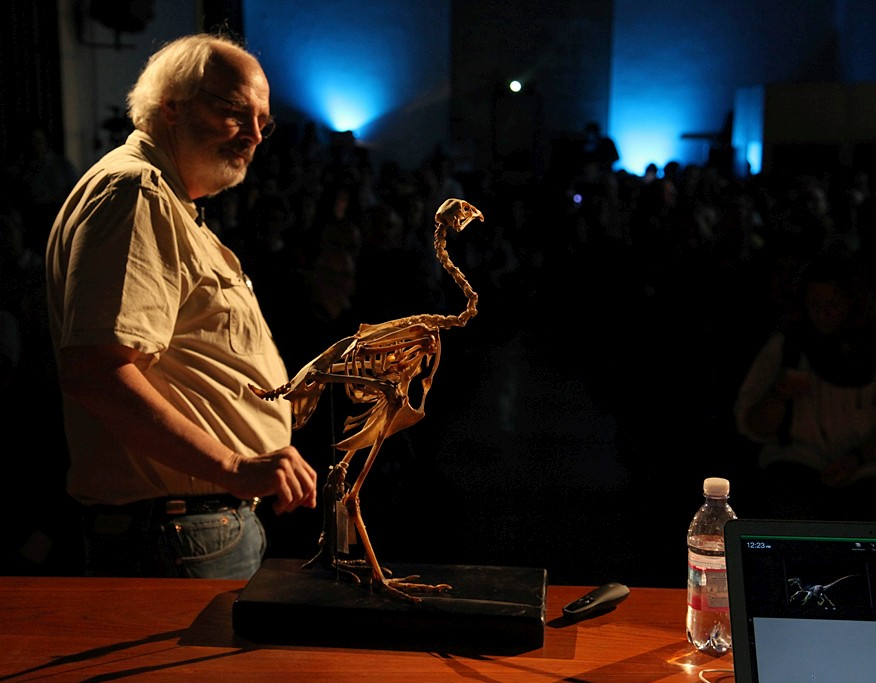
Horner with a bird skeleton at an event in the Museo Civico di Storia Naturale di Milano.

Horner's 2009 book, How to Build a Dinosaur: Extinction Doesn't Have to Be Forever, describes his plan to recreate a dinosaur by genetically "nudging" the DNA of a chicken. Horner's idea for the project came from an early script for the film Jurassic World. He had been planning the book as early as June 2005; Horner has hinted that the book was originally planned to be released simultaneously with the fourth Jurassic Park film as a scientific companion volume.

In 2011, Horner pursued the project to develop the animal, which he describes as a "chickenosaurus", with a team of geneticists. By November 2014, Horner and his team had conducted some of the earliest research into the embryonic development of tails. They also stated that such research may ultimately lead to new treatments for people with spinal disorders. Research into the mesenchyme tissue of chicken embryos, which direct the growth of teeth, may also aid in the treatment of human sarcomas. George Lucas had funded most of the project's costs up to that point, while an additional $5 million was needed. Horner expected to have a living dinosaur within 10 years. In 2026, released emails from the Epstein files revealed that Horner had discussed the project with Jeffrey Epstein in 2012, and that Epstein had expressed interest in funding the project.

In 2015, an independent group of scientists reported that they had found a way to turn the beaks of chicken embryos back into dinosaur-like snouts, by reverse genetic engineering, and University of Chile geneticists have produced embryos with dinosaur-like leg and foot anatomy including the fibula being full-length, reaching the ankle.

== Personal life ==
Jack Horner has been married four times. On March 30, 1972 he married his first wife, Virginia Lee Seacotte, with whom he has a son, Jason James Horner. After divorcing from Seacotte in 1982, he married Joann Katherine Raffelson on October 3, 1986, from whom he divorced in 1994. Less than a year after his divorce from Raffelson, Horner married Celeste Claire Roach on January 21, 1995. Their marriage lasted ten years until they divorced in 2005. On January 15, 2012, 65-year-old Horner married Vanessa Weaver — a 19-year-old Montana State University undergraduate paleontology student and volunteer in his lab — in Las Vegas. Horner would later go on to state that the marriage was "their way of telling the university [...] to butt out of their relationship", after Horner was told to disclose the nature of their relationship and that they would be scrutinized. The couple had divorced by August 2016, and remained friends at the time.

=== Controversies ===
Horner's 2012 marriage with 19-year-old undergraduate student Vanessa Weaver caused controversy and led him to depart from both Montana State University and the Museum of the Rockies in 2016.

In February 2026 it was revealed that Horner was mentioned in the Epstein files. According to these records, Horner visited a New Mexico property owned by Jeffrey Epstein in 2012 and exchanged several emails with him thereafter during the same year. These messages contain expressions of thanks for hospitality received, hint at possible financial or logistical support for some of Horner's scientific projects and include a plea by Horner to "Please give my best to Jeffrey and the girls". In a statement he released that same month, Horner claimed to have been unaware of Epstein's wrongdoings, aside from his charge for soliciting a prostitute, for which he served a prison sentence. Currently there is no evidence of Horner's direct involvement with any of Epstein's criminal activity. However, this revelation put an end to his employment at Chapman University.

== Appearances in popular culture ==
In 1985, the CBS television documentary Dinosaur! showed Horner talking to the camera about the "Egg Mountain" site and its related discoveries. Horner reappeared on television, this time with extended screen time about the Maiasaura discoveries, in another programme: The Great Dinosaur Hunt, part of the PBS series The Infinite Voyage. The Great Dinosaur Hunt first aired on January 4, 1989. In 1991 two short documentaries produced by Earthtalk Studios: A Giant Leap for Dinosaurs and Dinosaur Hunters, both directed by Daniel J. Smith, showed Jack Horner at Camp Makela — the on-site camp at "Egg Mountain" — talking with children and adolescents about the cutting edge of dinosaur research.

Horner was the subject of the 1994 biographical book Jack Horner: Living With Dinosaurs (Science Superstars), authored by Don Lessem and Janet Hamlin. In 2021 Horner was also the subject of the children's book Jack Horner, Dinosaur Hunter!, written by Sophia Gholz, illustrated by Dave Shephard, and published by Sleeping Bear Press. The book, which has been translated into French, chronicles the life of Horner, from a child in Montana to an adult on the set of Jurassic Park, and discusses Horner's scientific contributions as well as navigating life with a reading disability.

In popular culture, Horner is probably best remembered as one of the scientific advisors who were hired for the Jurassic Park franchise, for which he consulted on the first five films. He also had a cameo appearance in Jurassic World, and served as a partial inspiration for one of the lead characters of the franchise, Dr. Alan Grant. Regarding that latter, after being asked by Max Kutner of the Smithsonian Magazine ("So Crichton based Dr. Alan Grant on you?") Horner himself responded:

I think he had sort of mashed together Bob Bakker and myself. He had read and acknowledged reading Bob Bakker's book, Dinosaur Renaissance, and my book, Digging Dinosaurs, and so he had mashed the characters together. And then Steven came and sort of took my character aside and made the Alan Grant character.

— Max Kutner, "The Scientist Behind "Jurassic World", Jack Horner, Breaks Down the Movie's Thrilling Trailer", Smithsonian Magazine (December 2, 2014)

== Accolades ==
In 1986 the University of Montana awarded Jack Horner an honorary Doctorate in Science. He was awarded the prestigious MacArthur Fellowship in that same year. In 1989, Horner was granted the New York Academy of Sciences Children's Science Book Award for his 1988 book Digging Dinosaurs: The Search That Unraveled the Mystery of Baby Dinosaurs. In 1993, he received the Golden Plate Award of the American Academy of Achievement for his work in paleontology. Horner was awarded an honorary doctorate by Pennsylvania State University in 2006 in recognition of his work. On November 2, 2013, Horner was awarded the Romer-Simpson Medal, the highest honor a paleontologist can receive from the Society of Vertebrate Paleontology.

== Books ==
=== Popular science books by Jack Horner ===
- Digging Dinosaurs: The Search That Unraveled the Mystery of Baby Dinosaurs (1988, with James Gorman, Workman Publishing)
- The Complete T. Rex: How Stunning New Discoveries Are Changing Our Understanding of the World's Most Famous Dinosaur (1993, with Don Lessem, Simon & Schuster)
- Dinosaur Eggs and Babies (1994, with Kenneth Carpenter and Karl F. Hirsch, Cambridge University Press)
- Digging Up Tyrannosaurus Rex: The Remarkable Story of the Discovery of the First Complete Tyrannosaurus rex Ever Found (1995, with Don Lessem, Knopf Books for Young Readers)
- Dinosaur Lives: Unearthing an Evolutionary Saga (1998, with Edwin Dobb, Harcourt)
- Dinosaurs: Under the Big Sky (2001, Mountain Press)
- How to Build a Dinosaur: Extinction Doesn't Have to Be Forever (2009, with James Gorman, Dutton Adult)
- Dinosaurs of Montana (2025, with Raymond R. Rogers, Montana Bureau of Mines and Geology, illustrations by Doug Henderson)

=== Children's books by Jack Horner ===
- Maia: A Dinosaur Grows Up (1985, with James Gorman and Jeri D. Walton, published by the Museum of the Rockies, illustrations by Doug Henderson)
- Digging Up Dinosaurs (2007, Farcountry Press, illustrations by Robert Rath and Phil Wilson)
- Lily and Maia: A Dinosaur Adventure (2023, Horner Science Group, illustrations by Grace Hattrup)

=== Novels by Jack Horner ===
- Dinosaur Valley (2025, with Julian Michael Carver, Pteranodon Press)
