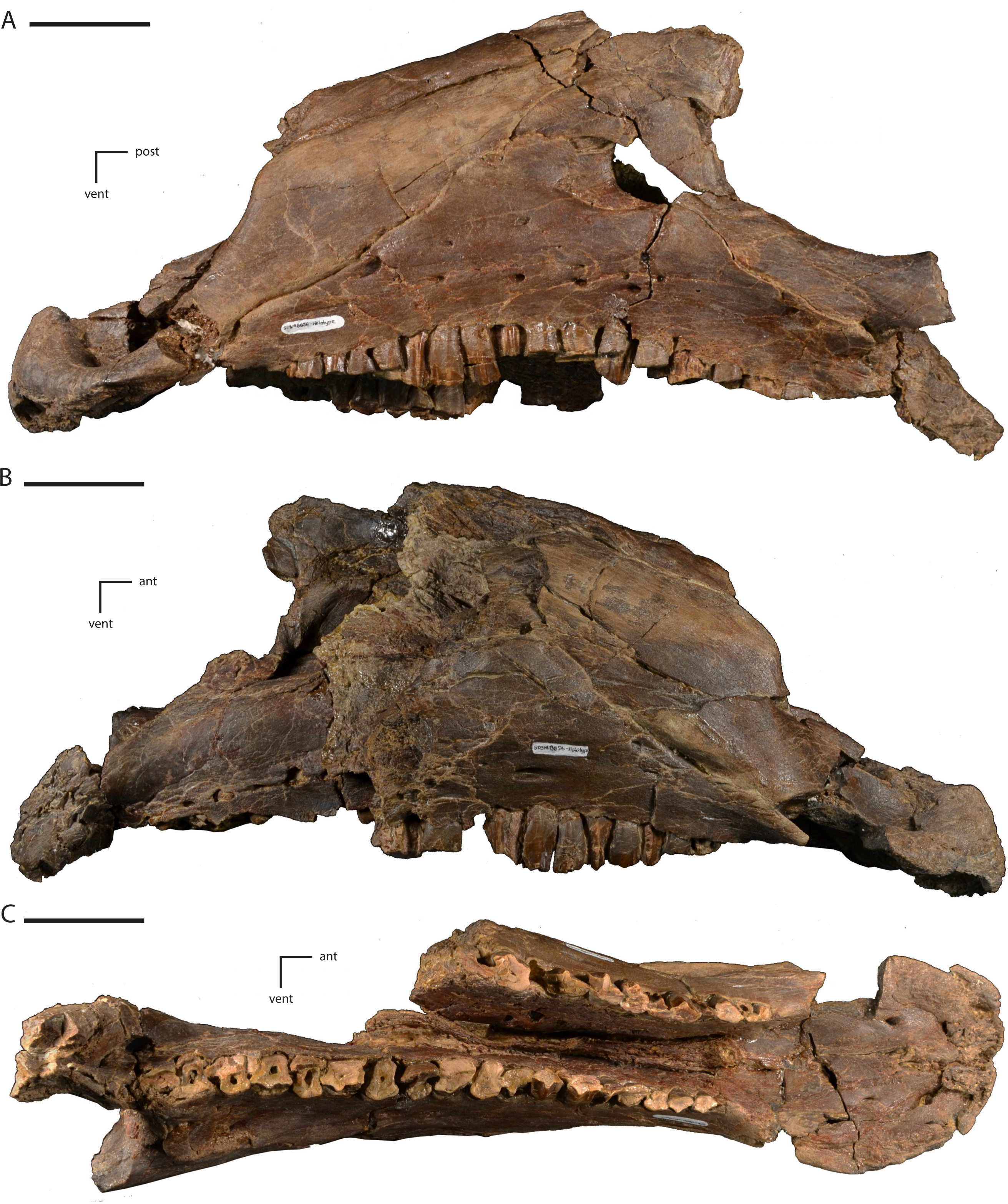
- Front part of the holotype skull

Scientific classification
- Kingdom: Animalia
- Phylum: Chordata
- Class: Reptilia
- Clade: Dinosauria
- Clade: †Ornithischia
- Clade: †Ornithopoda
- Clade: †Ankylopollexia
- Clade: †Styracosterna
- Genus: †Dakotadon; Paul, 2008
- Species: †D. lakotaensis

Binomial name
- †Dakotadon lakotaensis (Weishampel & Bjork, 1989)

Synonyms
- Iguanodon lakotaensis Weishampel & Bjork, 1989

= Dakotadon =

Dakotadon Temporal range: Early Cretaceous, Valanginian–Barremian

Extinct genus of dinosaurs

Dakotadon (meaning "Dakota tooth") is a genus of iguanodont dinosaur from the Early Cretaceous (Valanginian to Barremian) Lakota Formation of South Dakota, USA, known from a partial skull. It was first described in 1989 as Iguanodon lakotaensis, by David B. Weishampel and Philip R. Bjork. Its assignment has been controversial. Some researchers suggested that "I." lakotaensis was more basal than I. bernissartensis, and related to Theiophytalia, but David Norman has suggested that it was a synonym of I. bernissartensis. Gregory S. Paul, working on a revision of iguanodont species, gave "I." lakotaensis its own genus, Dakotadon, in 2008. He measured its length at 6 metres (20 ft) and body mass at 1 metric ton (1.1 short tons).

== History and naming ==
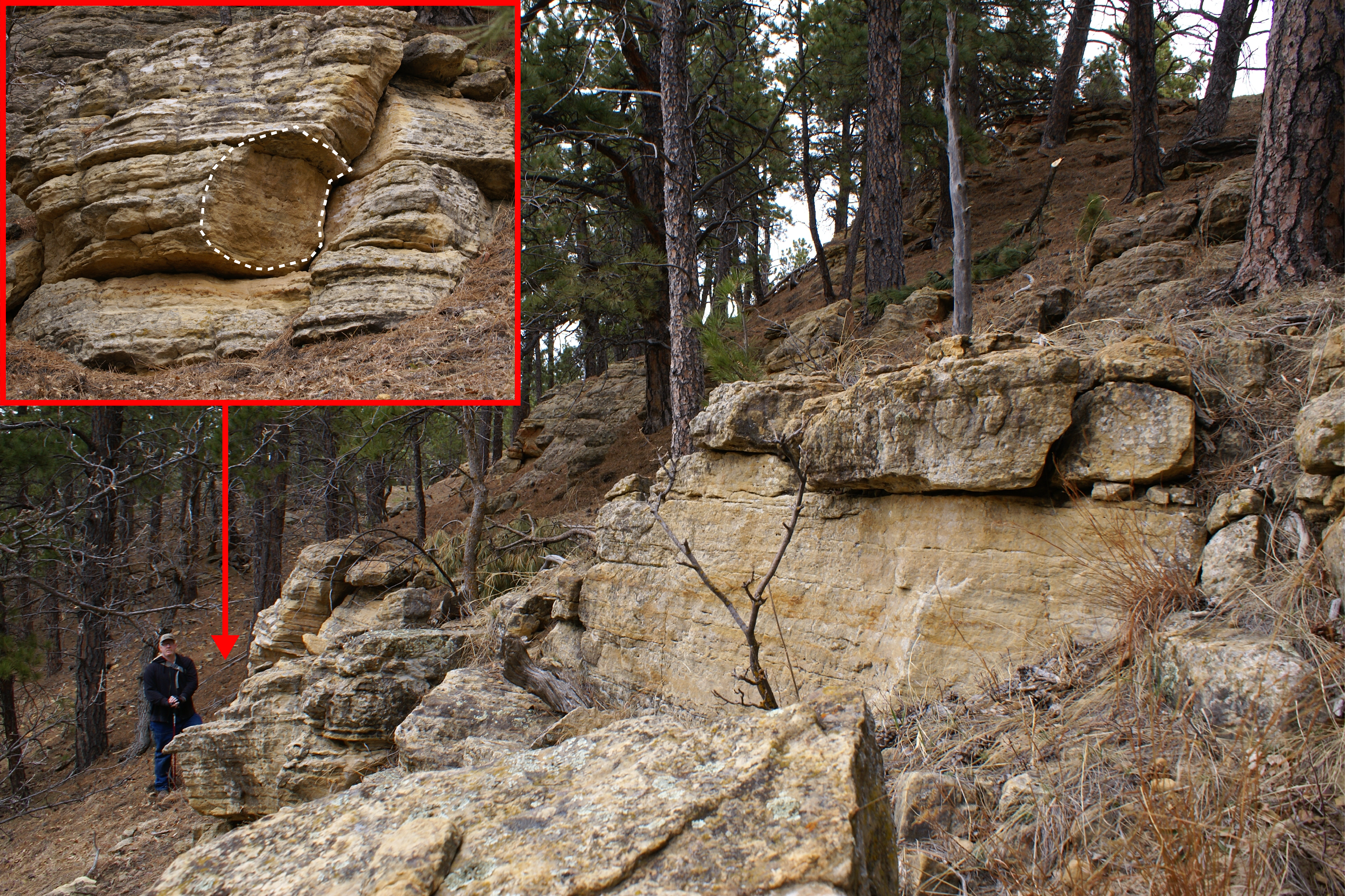
Type locality of Dakotadon within the Lakota Formation

In November 1985, a partial skull and associated skeleton was brought to the attention of South Dakota School of Mines and Technology professor emeritus John Willard. The material had been found earlier by Louis Rossow, who collected geological specimens from outcrops on homesteads in Whitewood, South Dakota, who assembled a crew of his family to carve the specimen from the outcrop. It was then stored in his garage until his son Dale Rossow informed Willard of it. Willard then brought the snout of the skull to Morton Green of the SDSMT Museum of Geology, who turned it over to museum paleontologist Philip R. Bjork to investigate. The specimen was donated to the museum, being accessioned as SDSM 8656. Coming from a hogback north of Sturgis, South Dakota, SDSM 8656 is from the Early Cretaceous Lakota Formation, but without better locality information its exact age was uncertain. Bjork described the material with American paleontologist David B. Weishampel in 1989 in paleontology, designating it as the new species Iguanodon lakotaensis after the Lakota people who inhabited the land and gave their name to the Lakota Formation. Weishampel and Bjork considered I. lakotaensis to share features unique to the other established Iguanodon species, I. atherfieldensis and I. bernissartensis, which are both from the Barremian of Europe. However, despite its slightly larger size than I. atherfieldensis, I. lakotaensis had fewer teeth and some other features to suggest than it was more distantly related than the two European species. Weishampel and Bjork also compared I. lakotaensis to Iguanodon ottingeri and Camptosaurus depressus, both from the Early Cretaceous of North America, but found that the limited material rendered I. ottingeri a nomen dubium and C. depressus a more distant iguanodont.

While it was supported as a species of Iguanodon by Weishampel and British paleontologist David B. Norman in 1990 and Norman in 2004, the identity of I. lakotaensis as a valid species of Iguanodon was questioned by Norman in 1998, who instead found it was identical to I. bernissartensis and supported a dispersal of the species across the entire Northern Hemisphere (also including Iguanodon orientalis from Mongolia). American paleontologist Robert T. Bakker supported the distinction of I. lakotaensis in 1998, comparing it favorably to a skull previously described as part of Camptosaurus amplus as a more primitive species of Iguanodon. This other skull was named Theiophytalia in 2006 by American paleontologists Kathleen Brill and Kenneth Carpenter, who also found that the differences between I. lakotaensis and Iguanodon bernissartensis suggested that a new genus was needed. The new genus name Dakotadon was given by American paleontologist Gregory S. Paul in 2008, in reference to its location of discovery, who also found it was a more basal iguanodont outside Iguanodontidae and Iguanodontoidea.

The importance of Dakotadon as the most complete Early Cretaceous dinosaur from the Black Hills region led Boyd and Pagnac to attempt to relocate the type locality to better determine its age and stratigraphy. In spring 2014, they returned to the site, east of Whitewood, being guided by the grandchildren of Louis Rossow. The original locality was relocated and numbered as SDSM V 2015-1 and the stratigraphy was measured to be able to correlate the Dakotadon locality with more extensive deposits of the Lakota Formation near Sturgis. SDSM V 2015-1 is an exposed face of 15 m (49 ft) of resistant sandstone, with four distinct units of buff to rust coloration. This sediment best matches the L2 unit of the Lakota Formation, which is the lower portion of the Fuson Member. This gives Dakotadon a late Valanginian to early Barremian age, older than most previous assessments. Boyd and Pagnac also undertook a more complete preparation of SDSM 8656, repairing previous work done to preserve the specimen and in the process uncovering more bones that had previously been encased in matrix, allowing for more insight into its anatomy. The complete holotype of Dakotadon after repreparation included a partial skull, lower jaws, and dorsal and caudal vertebrae, with some of the facial bones first described by Weishampel and Bjork either being missing or reidentified.
