= Philip R. Bjork =

American geologist and paleontologist

- Born: Philip Reese Bjork; September 14, 1940 (age 85)
- Education: University of Michigan
- Occupations: Geologist, paleontologist, professor

Philip Reese Bjork is an American geologist and paleontologist known for his work in unearthing dinosaur species in America.

== Career ==
Bjork received his undergraduate degree at the University of Michigan. Bjork's Master's thesis was on the vertebrate fossils of the Slim Buttes. He was a professor at the South Dakota School of Mines and Technology in Rapid City, South Dakota, as well as serving as director of their Museum of Geology from 1975 to 2000. His academic focus was on Cretaceous dinosaurs and mammals from the Cretaceous and early Cenozoic.

=== Highlights ===
1975
Bjork described a fossil of Proscalops tertius, an extinct insectivoran, that he had found in Oligocene deposits in the Badlands National Park.
1985
He announced the find of remains of at least ten duck-billed dinosaurs in western South Dakota.
1989
Bjork reported the discovery of Dakotadon, originally believed to be the first remains of Iguanodon found in North America, in the Lakota Formation of South Dakota; the remains included the skull, partial mandible, and incomplete caudal and dorsal vertebrae.

=== Selected publications ===
- Bjork, Philip R. (January 1967). "Latest Eocene Vertebrates from Northwestern South Dakota". Journal of Paleontology. 41 (1). SEPM Society for Sedimentary Geology: 227–236. ISSN 0022-3360. JSTOR 1301919.
- Bjork, Philip R. (1970). "The Carnivora of the Hagerman Local Fauna (Late Pliocene) of Southwestern Idaho". Transactions of the American Philosophical Society. 60 (7). American Philosophical Society: 3–54. doi:10.2307/1006119. JSTOR 1006119.
