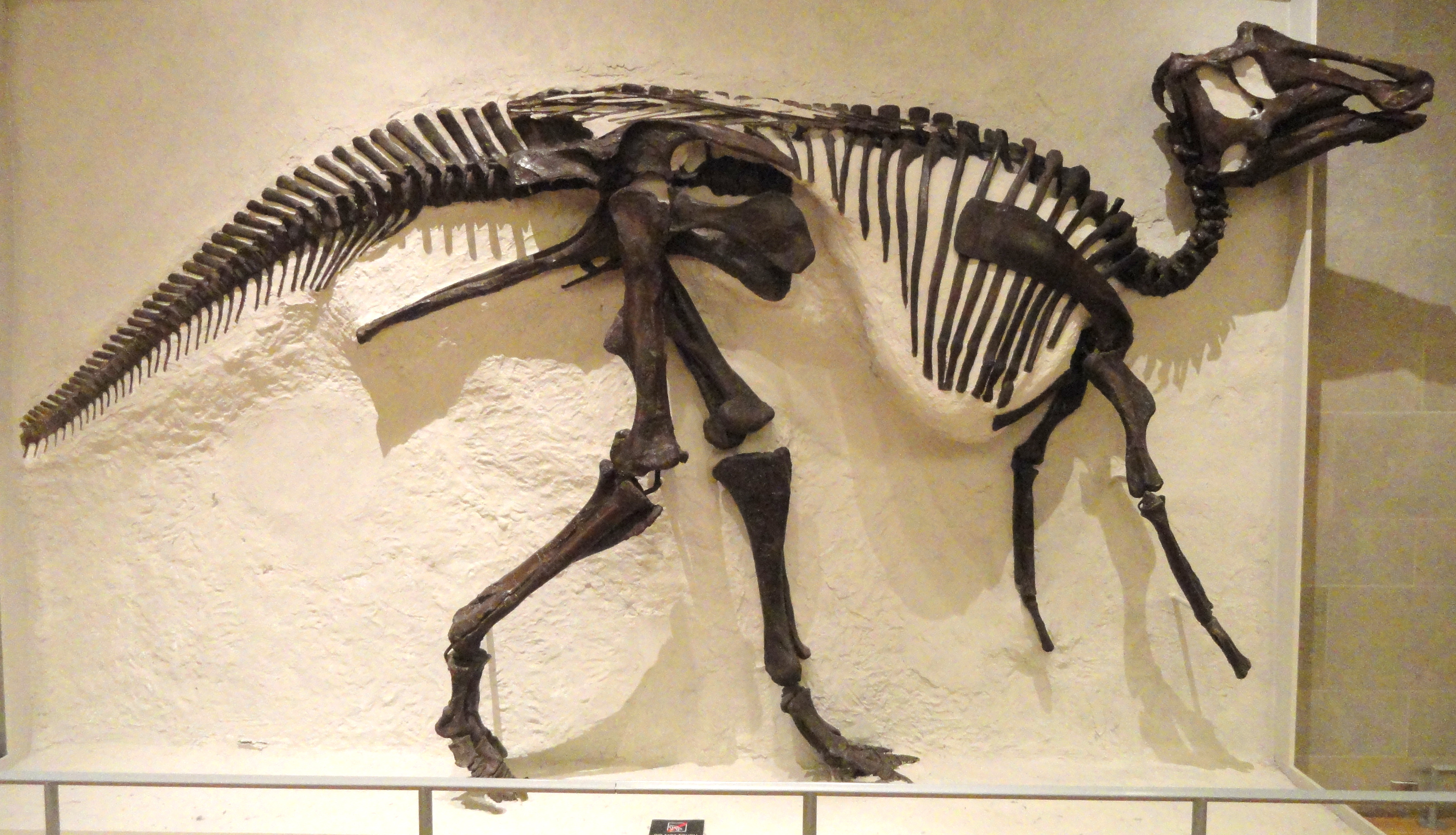
- P. maximus specimen collected 1921, Royal Ontario Museum

Scientific classification
- Kingdom: Animalia
- Phylum: Chordata
- Class: Reptilia
- Clade: Dinosauria
- Clade: †Ornithischia
- Clade: †Ornithopoda
- Family: †Hadrosauridae
- Subfamily: †Saurolophinae
- Genus: †Prosaurolophus; Brown, 1916
- Species: †P. maximus

Binomial name
- †Prosaurolophus maximus Brown, 1916

Synonyms
- Prosaurolophus blackfeetensis Horner, 1992; Saurolophus maximus (Brown, 1916) Paul, 2010; Saurolophus blackfeetensis (Horner, 1992) Paul, 2010

= Prosaurolophus =

Prosaurolophus Temporal range: Late Cretaceous, 75.7–74.1 Ma

Extinct genus of dinosaurs

Prosaurolophus (/ˌproʊsɔːˈrɒləfəs/; meaning "before Saurolophus", in comparison to the later dinosaur with a similar head crest) is a genus of hadrosaurid (or duck-billed) dinosaur from the Late Cretaceous of North America. It is known from the remains of at least 25 individuals, including skulls and skeletons, but this remains obscure. Its fossils have been found in the late Campanian-aged Dinosaur Park Formation in Alberta, and the roughly contemporaneous Two Medicine Formation in Montana, dating to around 75.7 to 74.1 million years ago. Its most recognizable feature is a small solid crest formed by the nasal bones, sticking up in front of the eyes. The type species is P. maximus, described by American paleontologist Barnum Brown of the American Museum of Natural History in 1916. A second species, P. blackfeetensis, was described by Jack Horner of the Museum of the Rockies in 1992. However, subsequent research has found P. blackfeetensis to be synonymous with P. maximus making the genus monotypic.

== History of discovery ==
Well-known paleontologist Barnum Brown recovered a duckbill skull in 1915 for the American Museum of Natural History (AMNH 5836) from the Red Deer River of Alberta, near Steveville. He described the specimen in 1916 as a new genus, Prosaurolophus. Brown's choice of name comes from a comparison to the genus Saurolophus, which he had described in 1912. Saurolophus had a similar but longer and more spike-like head crest. The skull had a damaged muzzle and was inadvertently reconstructed too long, but better remains were soon found that showed the true shape; one is a nearly complete skeleton and skull, described by William Parks in 1924. Twenty to twenty-five individuals are known for this species, including seven skulls with at least some of the rest of the skeleton.

The second species, P. blackfeetensis, is based on a specimen in the Museum of the Rockies (MOR 454), which was described by another notable paleontologist, Jack Horner. This specimen, and the remains of three or four other individuals, were found in Glacier County, Montana. In this case, the fossils were found in a bonebed of Prosaurolophus remains, which indicates that the animals lived together for at least some time. The bonebed is interpreted as reflecting a group of animals that congregated near a water source during a drought.

Horner differentiated the two species by details of the crest. He interpreted P. blackfeetensis as having a steeper, taller face than P. maximus, with the crest migrating backward toward the eyes during growth. More recent studies have regarded the differences as insufficient to support two species.

== Description ==
Size comparison

Prosaurolophus was a large-headed duckbill; the most complete described specimen has a skull around 0.9 metres (3.0 ft) long with its body size measuring 8.5 metres (28 ft) in length and 3 metric tons (3.3 short tons) in body mass. It had a small, stout, triangular crest in front of the eyes; the sides of this crest were concave, forming depressions. This crest grew isometrically (i.e. without changing in proportion) throughout the lifetime of the individual, leading to speculation that the species may have had a soft tissue display structure, such inflatable nasal sacs.

When originally described by Brown, Prosaurolophus maximus was known from a skull and jaw. Half of the skull was badly weathered at the time of examination, and the level of the parietal was distortedly crushed upwards to the side. The different bones of the skull could be easily defined, with the exception of the parietals and nasal bones. Brown found that the skull of the already described genus Saurolophus is very similar overall to, but also smaller than the skull of P. maximus. The unique feature of a shortened frontal in lambeosaurines is also found in Prosaurolophus, and the other horned hadrosaurines Brachylophosaurus, Maiasaura, and Saurolophus. Although they lack a shorter frontal, the genera Edmontosaurus and Shantungosaurus share with saurolophins an elongated dentary.

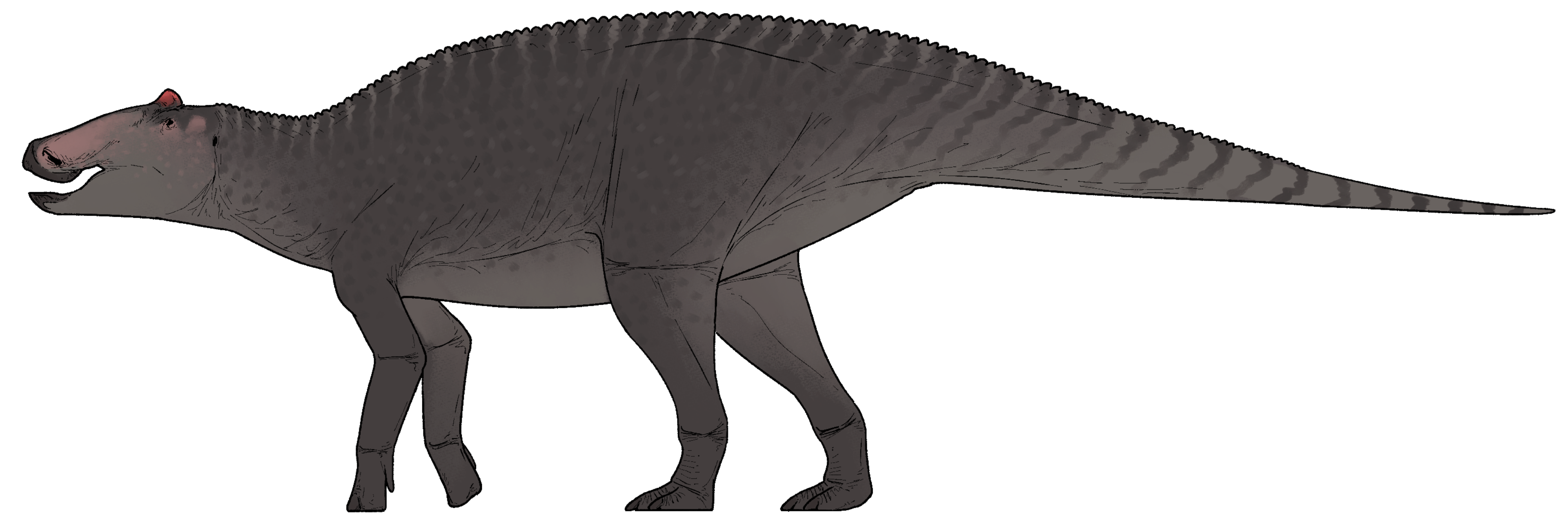
Life restoration

Patches of preserved skin are known from two juvenile specimens, TMP 1998.50.1 and TMP 2016.37.1; these pertain to the ventral extremity of the ninth through fourteenth dorsal ribs, the caudal margin of the scapular blade, and the pelvic region. Small basement scales (scales which makeup the majority of the skin surface), 3–7 millimetres (0.12–0.28 in) in diameter, are preserved on these patches - this is similar to the condition seen in other saurolophine hadrosaurs. More uniquely, feature scales (larger, less numerous scales which are interspersed within the basement scales) around 5 millimetres (0.20 in) wide and 29 millimetres (1.1 in) long are found interspersed in the smaller scales in the patches from the ribs and scapula (they are absent from the pelvic patches). Similar scales are known from the tail of the related Saurolophus angustirostris (on which they have been speculated to indicate pattern), and it is considered likely adult Prosaurolophus would've retained the feature scales on their flanks like the juveniles.

== Classification ==
Because of its name, Prosaurolophus is often associated with Saurolophus. However, this is contentious; some authors have found the animals to be closely related, whereas others have not, instead finding it closer to Brachylophosaurus, Edmontosaurus, Gryposaurus, and Maiasaura.

=== History of classification ===
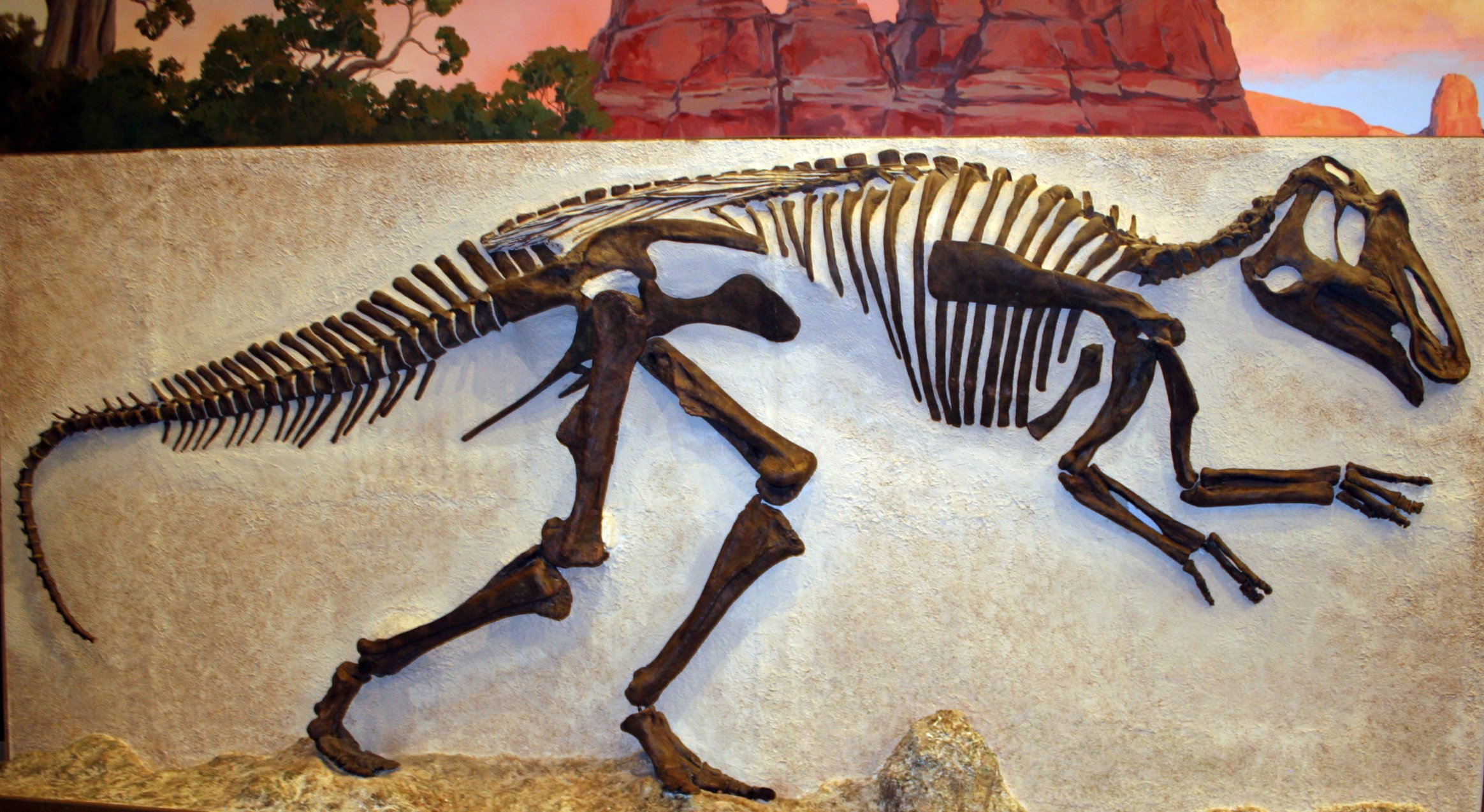
Panel mounted cast replica, Stewart Museum of Paleontology

In 1918, Lawrence Lambe revised the classifications of Hadrosauridae (then Trachodontidae). He invalidated the family name and Trachodontinae, replacing them with Hadrosauridae and Hadrosaurinae. The other subfamily in Hadrosauridae then was Saurolophinae, which included Stephanosaurus (= Lambeosaurus), Cheneosaurus, Corythosaurus, Prosaurolophus, and Saurolophus. Lambe, in 1920, split Saurolophinae and found only two genera remaining in it, Prosaurolophus, and the type genus. The previous genera were then reclassified into Stephanosaurinae or Hadrosaurinae. In 1928, Prosaurolophus was assigned to Saurolophinae by Franz Nopcsa. The group contained hadrosaurids with a "males with median horn-like protuberance on the skull" and "very numerous teeth", found by Nopsca to be Parasaurolophus, Saurolophus, and Prosaurolophus.

In 1954, Charles Sternberg reevaluated the genera in Hadrosauridae, invoking the probability that Saurolophinae should be sunk into Hadrosaurinae. This greatly changed the classifications of the family, as the "saurolophines" were kept separate because of their supposedly "footed" ischium. Sternberg identified that the "footed" ischium assigned to Saurolophus was not found with the holotype, and was only assigned to it because of the location of the find. Also, he noted that William Parks (1924) found a complete skeleton of Prosaurolophus clearly showing an "unfooted" ischium, which Sternberg realized meant that it was unlikely that Saurolophus possessed a "footed" ischium. Sternberg's reevaluation led to the abandonment of Saurolophinae.

Young (1958) found that the subfamily Saurolophinae, however, was not to be abandoned, and in it placed his new genus Tsintaosaurus, as well as Prosaurolophus and Saurolophus, and also Kritosaurus (which included Gryposaurus and excluded K. navajovius). Two years previous, Friedrich von Huene separated Saurolophinae from Hadrosauridae, naming Saurolophidae. Saurolophidae was a family in Huene's Hadrosauria, including the genera Prosaurolophus, Saurolophus, and the probably unrelated Bactrosaurus. Another author to support the separation of Saurolophinae was John Ostrom (1961). Ostrom found that the saurolophines Brachylophosaurus, Prosaurolophus, and Saurolophus all possessed a "pseudonarial crest", a feature which united them, while distinguishing them from hollow-crested lambeosaurines.

Hopson (1975) supported the division of Hadrosauridae into two subfamilies, Hadrosaurinae and Lambeosaurinae, and was first to suspect what modern analyses find. Hopson found that Hadrosaurinae could clearly be divided into groups, the "kritosaurs", the "edmontosaurs", and the "saurolophines", including Prosaurolophus, Saurolophus, Tsintaosaurus and Lophorhothon, and intermediate between the "kritosaurs" and "saurolophines". Brett-Surman (1975) also followed Sternberg with sinking Saurolophinae into Hadrosaurinae, and like Hopson, he recognized three groups within the subfamily. Like Hopson, one group was called the Edmontosaurus lineage, the second the Kritosaurus group, and the third uniting Prosaurolophus and Saurolophus. Over a decade later in 1989, Brett-Surman scientifically named the groups of hadrosaurines, the first becoming Edmontosaurini, the second Kritosaurini, and the third Saurolophini.

=== Phylogeny ===
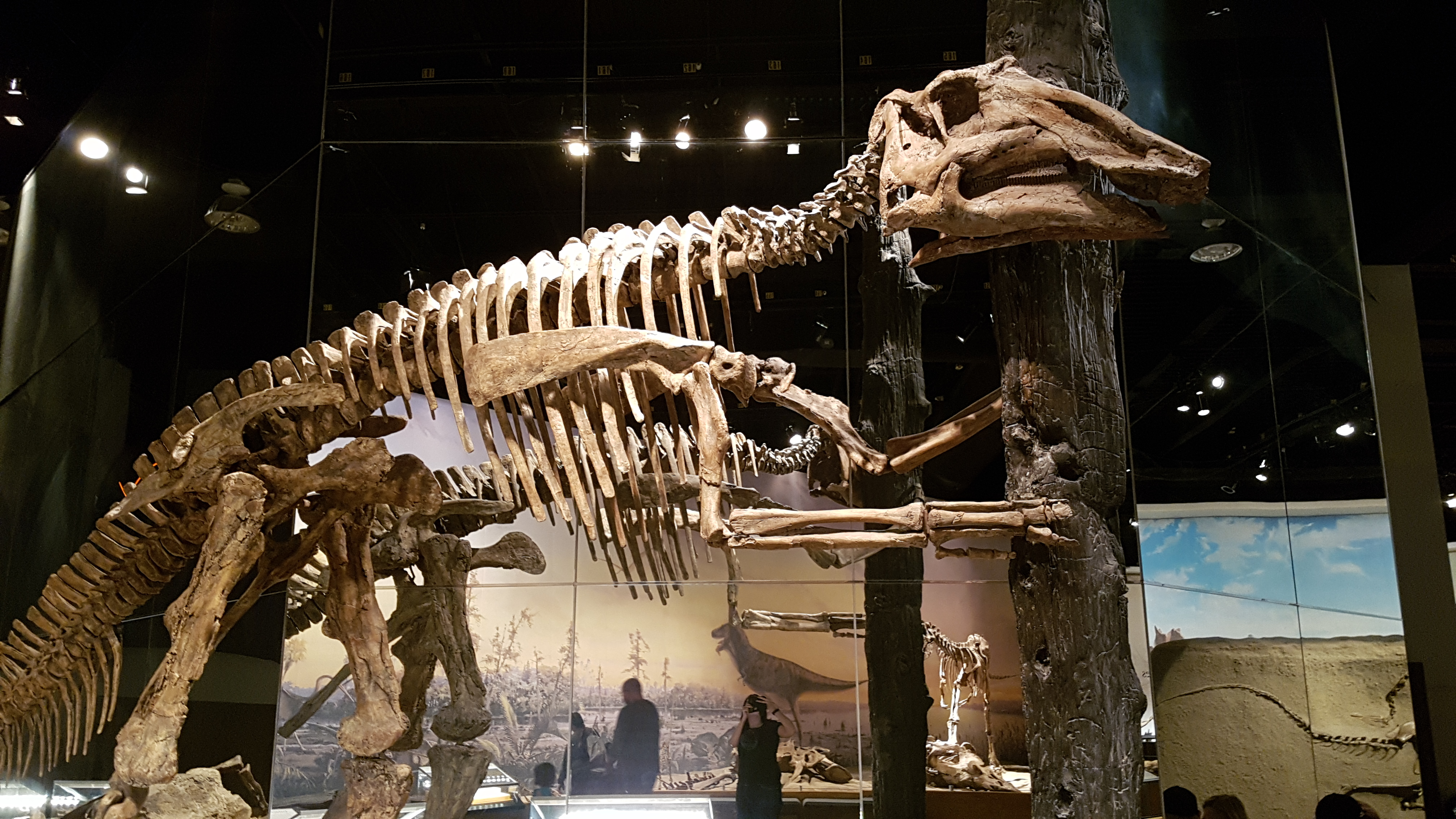
Skeletal mount, Royal Tyrrell Museum of Paleontology

The first cladistic analysis to encompass the interrelationships of Hadrosauridae was conducted by Weishampel and Horner (1990). They found Saurolophinae synonymous with Hadrosaurinae, but only separated the subfamily into two groups. The first group included Gryposaurus, Aralosaurus, Maiasaura, and Brachylophosaurus. The other contained Edmontosaurus, Saurolophus, Prosaurolophus, Lophorhothon, and Shantungosaurus.

A detailed cladgram of hadrosaurid relationships was published in 2013 by Acta Palaeontologica Polonica. The study was led by Alberto Prieto-Márquez, and recovered Prosaurolophus in a similar position as suggested by Brown in 1916. The below cladogram was the one recovered by their analysis:

- Saurolophinae
  - Brachylophosaurini
    - Acristravus gagstarsoni
    - - Brachylophosaurus canadensis
      - Maiasaura peeblesorum
  - - Shantungosaurus giganteus
    - - Edmontosaurus
        - Edmontosaurus regalis
        - Edmontosaurus annectens
      - - Saurolophini
          - Kerberosaurus manakini
          - - Sabinas OTU
            - - Prosaurolophus maximus
              - Saurolophus
                - Saurolophus morrisi
                - - Saurolophus osborni
                  - Saurolophus angustirostris
        - Kritosaurini
          - Wulagasaurus dongi
          - - Kritosaurus navajovius
            - - - Aquilarhinus
                - - Secernosaurus koerneri
                  - Willinakaqe salitralensis
              - Gryposaurus
                - Gryposaurus latidens
                - - Gryposaurus notabilis
                  - Gryposaurus monumentensis

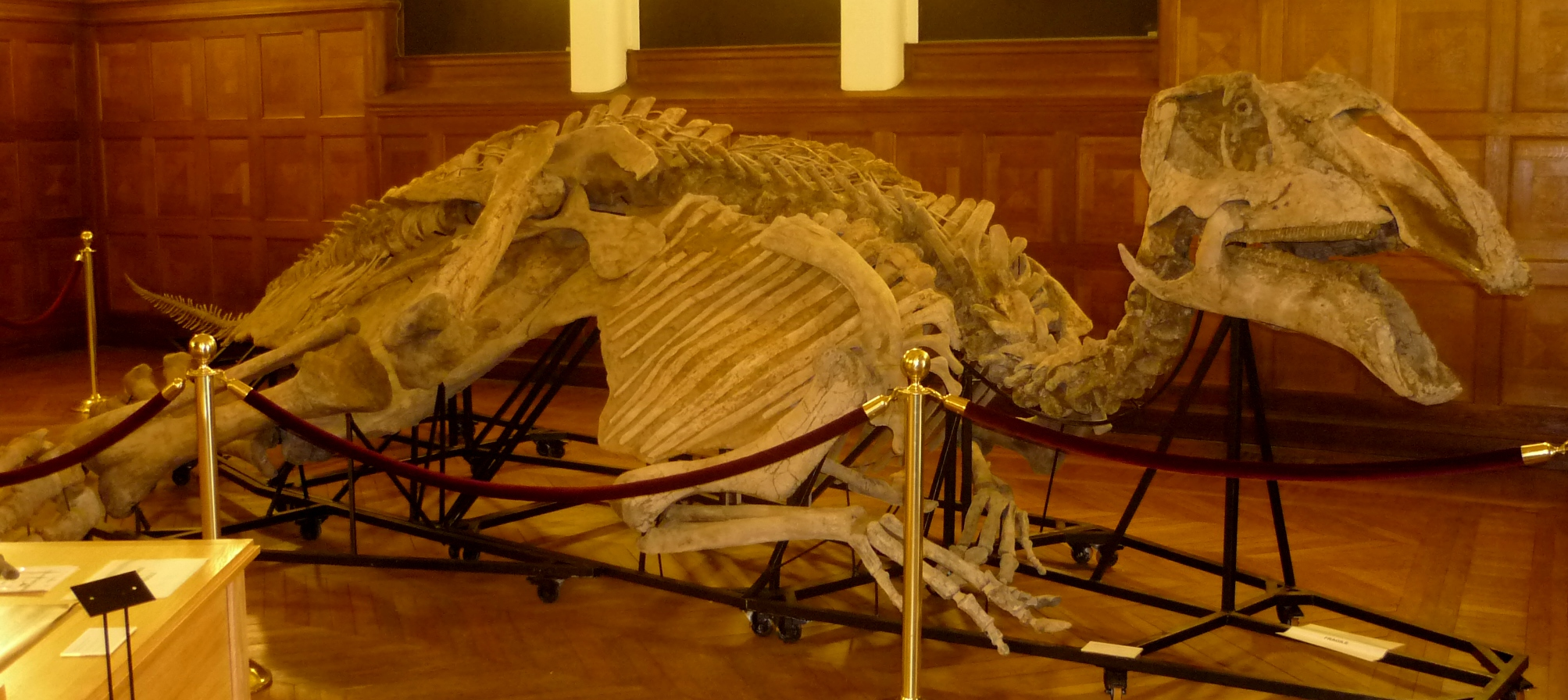
P. maximus specimen exhibited in Paris

In 2001, Prosaurolophus was studied with other hadrosaurids by Wagner. The genus, along with Corythosaurus and Maiasaura, were considered by Wagner to be synonymous with Saurolophus, Hypacrosaurus and Brachylophosaurus respectively. Prosaurolophus maximus was reassigned to Saurolophus as S. maximus. The same year however, Prosaurolophus was found to be distinct from Saurolophus, in an analysis of Hu et al. Their analysis was unique from any of the time, and they recovered Prosaurolophus in Saurolophinae, with Saurolophus, Lophorhothon, Tsintaosaurus, Jaxartosaurus, and Kritosaurus. No other analysis has recovered this group of dinosaurs.

Horner et al. (2004) also recovered a different phylogeny of Saurolophinae. Prosaurolophus was, for the first time, recovered separate from Saurolophus, in fact not even closely related. Prosaurolophus was found in a group with Brachylophosaurus, Maiasaura, Grpyosaurus, and Edmontosaurus, while Saurolophus was grouped with Naashoibitosaurus (=Kritosaurus) and "Kritosaurus" australis.

The Prosaurolophus-Saurolophus clade has been a problematic grouping when trying to place among hadrosaurines. Many skull features are similar to Edmontosaurus, while other are closer to Gryposaurus, so the group has been classified as close to both. However, the clade might be closer to Edmontosaurus, as the features are more numerous uniting them.

== Paleobiology ==
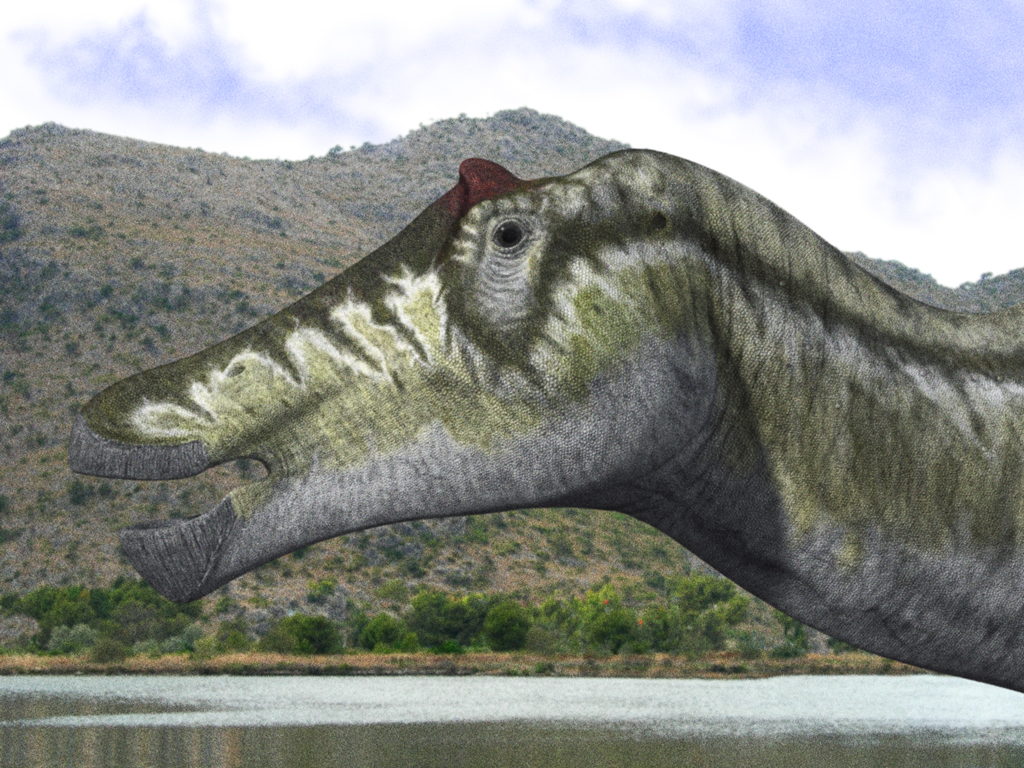
Three-dimensional reconstruction of a head

As a hadrosaurid, Prosaurolophus would have been a large herbivore, eating plants with a sophisticated skull that permitted a grinding motion analogous to chewing. Its teeth were continually replaced and packed into dental batteries that contained hundreds of teeth, only a relative handful of which were in use at any time. Plant material would have been cropped by its broad beak, and held in the jaws by a cheek-like structure. Feeding would have been from the ground up to around 4 meters (13 ft) above. Like other hadrosaurs, it could have moved both bipedally and quadrupedally. Comparisons between the scleral rings of Prosaurolophus and modern birds and reptiles suggest that it may have been cathemeral, active throughout the day at short intervals.

=== Social behavior ===
As noted, there is bonebed evidence that this genus lived in groups during at least part of the year. Additionally, it had several potential methods for display in a social setting. The bony facial crest is an obvious candidate, and nasal diverticula may also have been present. These postulated diverticula would have taken the form of inflatable soft-tissue sacs housed in the deep excavations flanking the crest and elongate holes for the nostrils. Such sacs could be used for both visual and auditory signals.

== Paleoecology ==
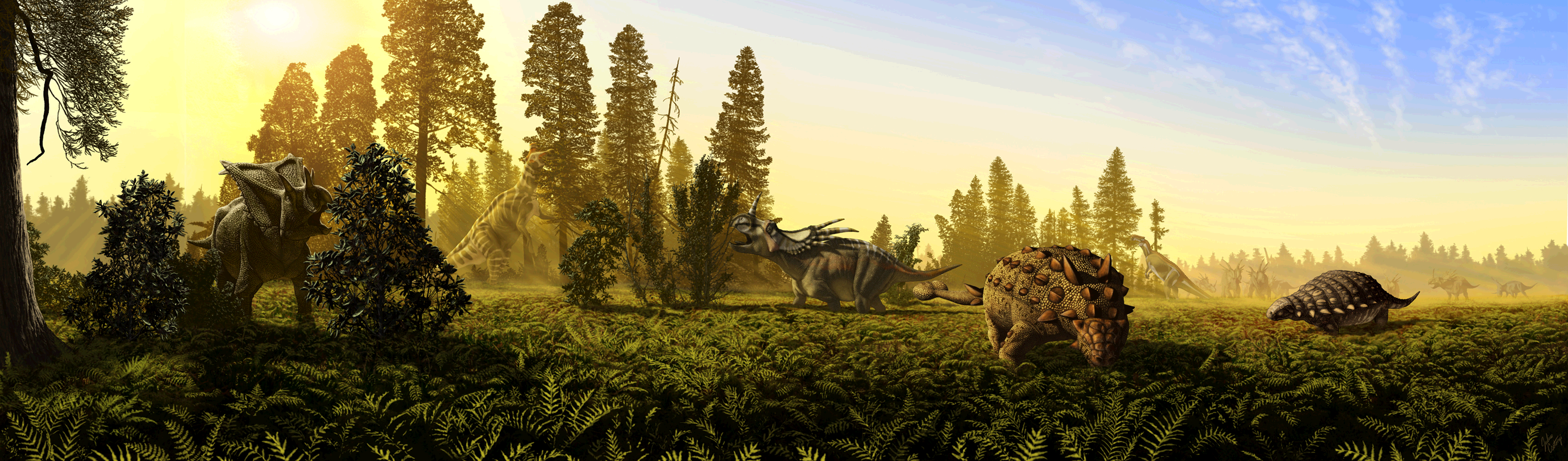
Depiction of the mega-herbivores in the Dinosaur Park Formation, P. maximus in the right distance

The Dinosaur Park Formation, home to Prosaurolophus maximus, is interpreted as a low-relief setting of rivers and floodplains that became more swampy and influenced by marine conditions over time as the Western Interior Seaway transgressed westward. The climate was warmer than present-day Alberta, without frost, but with wetter and drier seasons. Conifers were apparently the dominant canopy plants, with an understory of ferns, tree ferns, and flowering plants. In this well-studied formation, P. maximus is only known from the upper part, which had more of a marine influence than the lower section. It was the most common hadrosaurine of this section, which was deposited about 75.5 million years ago. The Dinosaur Park Formation was also home to well-known dinosaurs like the horned Centrosaurus, Styracosaurus, and Chasmosaurus, fellow duckbills Gryposaurus, Corythosaurus, Lambeosaurus, and Parasaurolophus, tyrannosaurid Gorgosaurus, and armored Edmontonia and Euoplocephalus.

The roughly contemporaneous Two Medicine Formation, home to P. maximus, is well known for its fossils of dinosaur nests, eggs, and young, produced by the hadrosaurids Hypacrosaurus stebingeri and Maiasaura, and the troodontid Troodon. The tyrannosaurid Daspletosaurus, caenagnathid Chirostenotes, dromaeosaurids Bambiraptor and Saurornitholestes, armored dinosaurs Edmontonia and Euoplocephalus, hypsilophodont Orodromeus, and horned dinosaurs Achelousaurus, Brachyceratops, Einiosaurus, and Styracosaurus ovatus were also present. This formation was more distant from the Western Interior Seaway, and higher and drier than the Dinosaur Park Formation. The age of Prosaurolophus maximus remains from this formation is from approximately 75.5 to 74.0 million years ago.

=== Diet ===
Prosaurolophus maximus itself lived in coastal floodplains fed on the conifer trees and the tree bark in the area, implying that it was more likely a browser rather than a grazer.

== See also ==
- Timeline of hadrosaur research
