= Charles W. Gilmore =

American paleontologist

Charles Whitney Gilmore
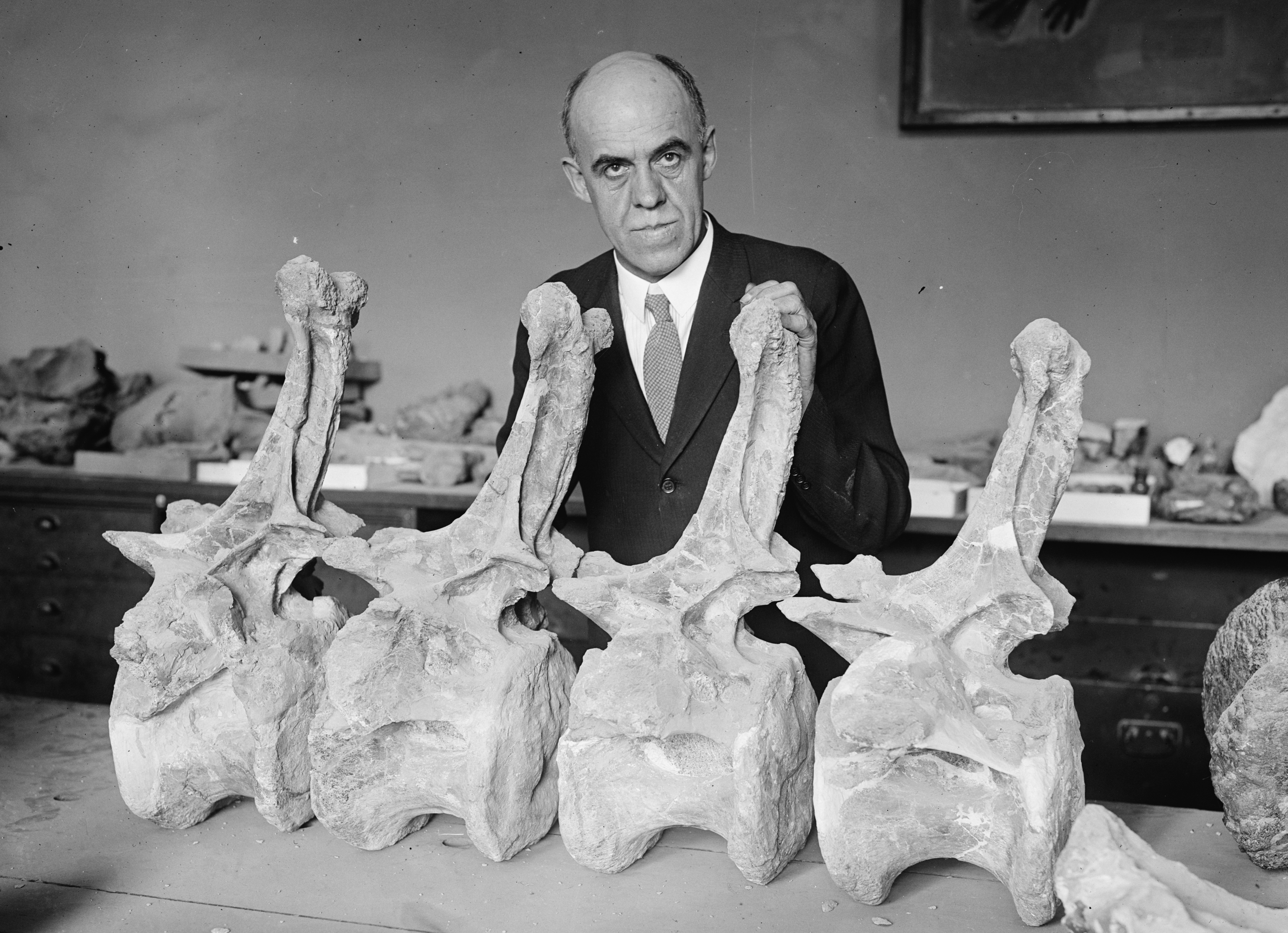
- Gilmore in 1924 with Diplodocus vertebrae
- Born: March 11, 1874
- Died: September 27, 1945 (aged 71)
- Title: Curator of Vertebrate Paleontology
- Scientific career
- Fields: Paleontology
- Workplaces: United States National Museum

Charles Whitney Gilmore (March 11, 1874 – September 27, 1945) was an American paleontologist who gained renown in the early 20th century for his work on vertebrate fossils during his career at the United States National Museum (now the National Museum of Natural History). Gilmore named many dinosaurs in North America and Mongolia, including the Cretaceous sauropod Alamosaurus, Alectrosaurus, Archaeornithomimus, Bactrosaurus, Brachyceratops, Chirostenotes, Mongolosaurus, Parrosaurus, Pinacosaurus, Styracosaurus ovatus (now Rubeosaurus) and Thescelosaurus.

== Career ==
Gilmore was working as a paleontologist for the Carnegie Museum of Natural History in 1901 when he found the skeleton of a young sauropod, which was classified the following year as an Apatosaurus.

In 1903 Gilmore was hired by the United States National Museum (now the National Museum of Natural History), part of the Smithsonian Institution. His first assignment there was to work on the vast O. C. Marsh collection amassed during the Bone Wars; the fossils had been transferred from Yale University's new Peabody Museum of Natural History after the collection outgrew the smaller museum's storage capacity.

Gilmore and assistant preparator Norman H. Boss, who later became Chief Preparator at the museum, mounted a complete Edmontosaurus in 1903. Together they built the world's first mounted Triceratops skeleton, which went on display in 1905. In May 1907, Gilmore headed an expedition to Alaska to search for fossils of Pleistocene vertebrates. Gilmore was named Custodian of Fossil Reptiles in 1908, and settled in the Park View neighborhood at 451 Park Road, NW.

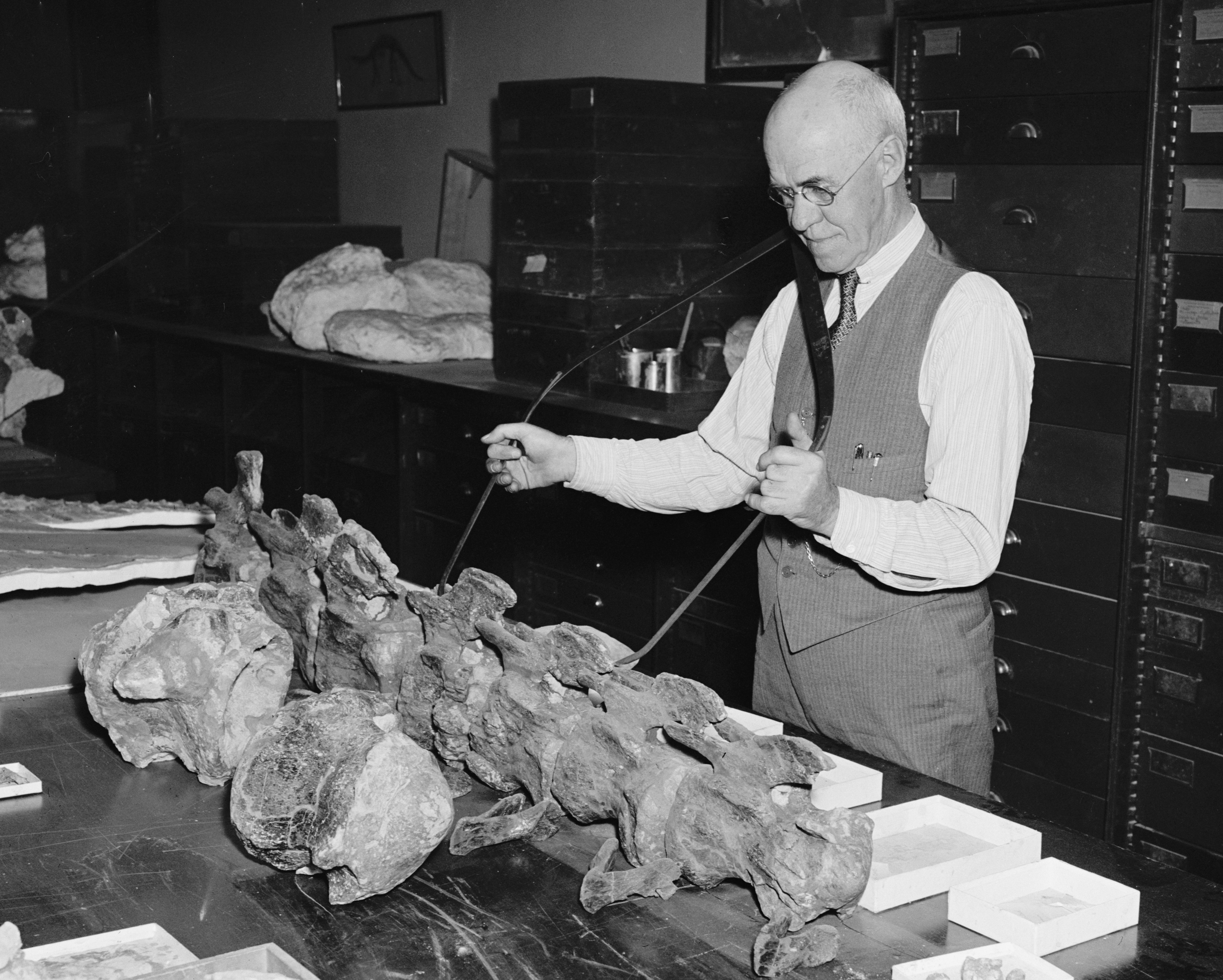
Gilmore measuring fossils in 1938

In 1923 Gilmore and Boss collected a Diplodocus longus in Dinosaur National Monument, Utah. Under Gilmore's direction, the specimen was mounted and displayed at the National Museum of Natural History in 1931, where the 70-foot (21 m) specimen proved the museum's most popular exhibit for the next 20 years. The museum promoted Gilmore to Curator of Vertebrate Paleontology in 1924.

Gilmore led sixteen expeditions to collect vertebrate fossils during his tenure as Curator. While much of his work was concentrated in Utah and Wyoming, he led an excavation of Montana's Two Medicine Formation in 1913, returning for further work in 1928 and again in 1935.

As Curator, Gilmore was often asked to identify fossils brought to the museum by the public. In 1938, he examined fossilized teeth discovered by a limestone quarrying operation and identified them as rare Pleistocene fossils of tapir, bear, and an extinct North American lion.

A prolific writer, Gilmore published 170 scientific papers during his career, including monographic studies on the osteology of Apatosaurus and Camptosaurus and the osteology of carnivorous and armored dinosaurs. As well as describing new dinosaurs, Gilmore wrote several monographs, including a 1914 monograph on Stegosaurus, a 1920 monograph on carnivorous dinosaurs, a 1936 review of Apatosaurus, as well as a more focused 1925 study of the Carnegie juvenile Camarasaurus.

Gilmore retired from the Smithsonian in 1945, and died on September 27 that year. He was buried on September 29, 1945, at Arlington National Cemetery.

A posthumously published paper by Gilmore in 1946 described a new species of Cretaceous tyrannosaur discovered in Montana four years earlier by David Dunkle and a team from the Cleveland Museum of Natural History. The specimen described in the paper was named Gorgosaurus lancensis by Gilmore and was originally considered a new species of Gorgosaurus. This species would later be renamed in 1988 as a member of a new genus, Nanotyrannus lancensis. Debate continued as to the validity of the species for decades, as many paleontologists considered Nanotyrannus to be an immature Tyrannosaurus rex rather than a separate species. However, Nanotyrannus has been demonstrated to have been a valid, and thus distinct genus of Tyrannosauroid in a 2025 study done by Lindsay Zanno and James Napoli.

The scientific names of Gilmoremys (an extinct soft-shelled turtle named in 2011), Shuangmiaosaurus gilmorei (an herbivorous dinosaur named in 2003), Richardoestesia gilmorei (a bipedal dinosaur named in 1990), and Gilmoreosaurus (a disputed dinosaur genus named in 1979) honor Gilmore's contributions to vertebrate paleontology.

== Selected works ==
- 1908. Smithsonian exploration in Alaska in 1907 in search of Pleistocene fossil vertebrates.
- 1909. A new rhynchocephalian reptile from the Jurassic of Wyoming, with notes on the fauna of "Quarry 9".
- 1909. Osteology of the jurassic reptile Camptosaurus: with a revision of the species of the genus, and description of two new species.
- 1914. Osteology of the armored Dinosauria in the United States National museum : with special reference to the genus Stegosaurus.
- 1914. A new ceratopsian dinosaur from the Upper Cretaceous of Montana, with a note on Hypacrosaurus.
- 1915. Osteology of Thescelosaurus, an orthopodus dinosaur from the Lance Formation of Wyoming.
- 1916. The fossil turtles of the Uinta formation.
- 1917. Brachyceratops, a ceratopsian dinosaur from the Two Medicine formation of Montana, with notes on associated fossil reptiles.
- 1919. Reptilian faunas of the Torrejon, Puerco, and underlying Upper Cretaceous formations of San Juan County, New Mexico.
- 1920. Osteology of the carnivorous Dinosauria in the United States National museum, with special reference to the genera Antrodemus (Allosaurus) and Ceratosaurus.
- 1921. The fauna of the Arundel formation of Maryland.
- 1922. A new description of Saniwa ensidens Leidy, an extinct varanid lizard from Wyoming.
- 1924. On the genus Stephanosaurus, with a description of the type specimen of Lambeosaurus lambei.
- 1924. A new coelurid dinosaur from the Belly River Cretaceous of Alberta.
- 1930. Cold-blooded vertebrates. Parts II and III: Amphibians and Reptiles. with Samuel F. Hildebrand and Doris M. Cochran.
- 1933. On the dinosaurian fauna of the Iren Dabasu Formation.
- 1933. Two new dinosaurian reptiles from Mongolia with notes on some fragmentary specimens.
- 1938. Fossil snakes of North America.
- 1939. A review of recent progress in reptilian paleontology.
- 1945. A new Eocene lizard from Wyoming with Glenn Lowell Jepsen.
- 1945. A new sauropod dinosaur from the Upper Cretaceous of Missouri with Dan R. Stewart.
- 1946. A new crocodilian from the Eocene of Utah (published posthumously).

== See also ==
- Paleoart
