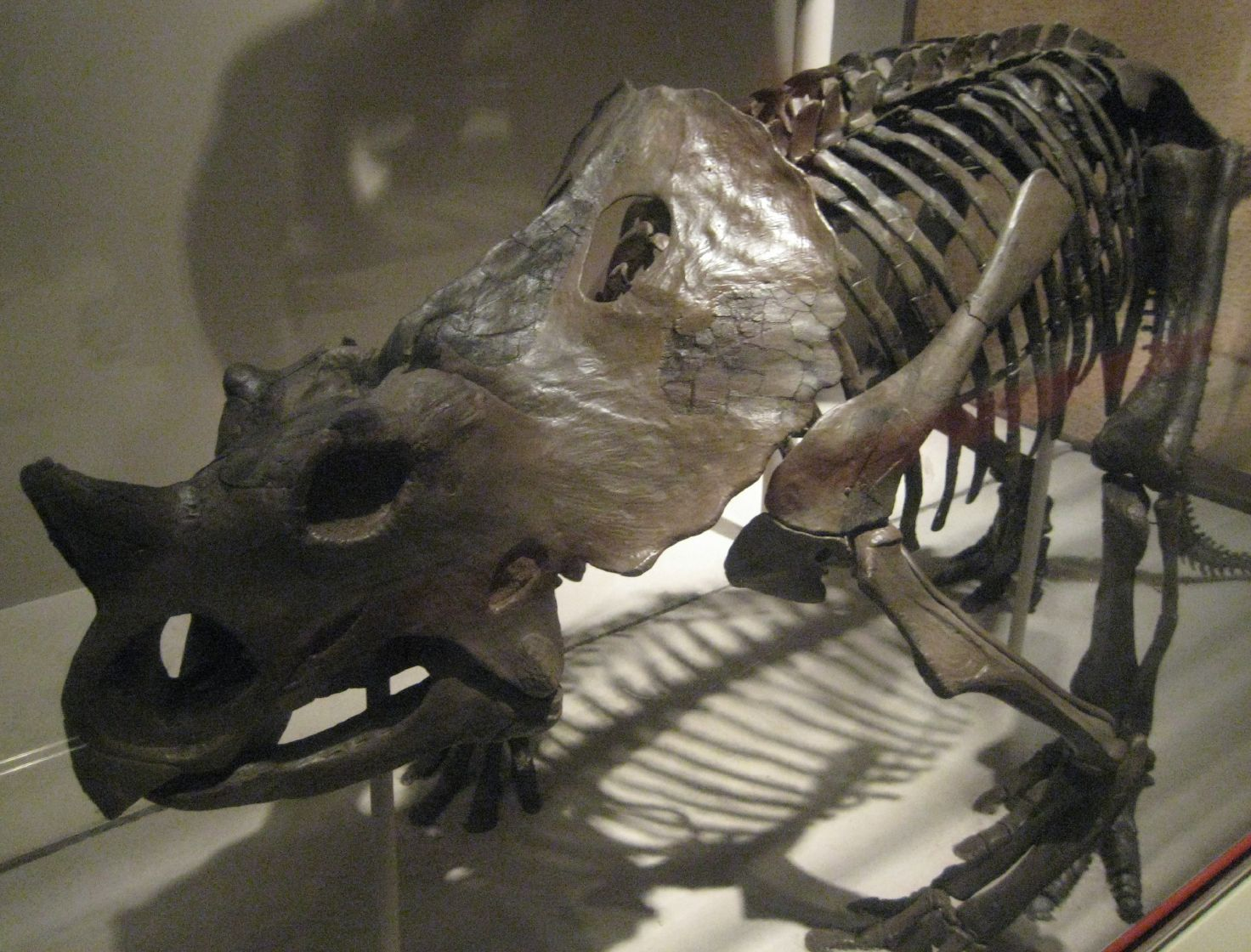
- Holotype specimen USNM 7951 mounted in the Smithsonian

Scientific classification
- Kingdom: Animalia
- Phylum: Chordata
- Class: Reptilia
- Clade: Dinosauria
- Clade: †Ornithischia
- Clade: †Ceratopsia
- Family: †Ceratopsidae
- Subfamily: †Centrosaurinae
- Genus: †Brachyceratops; Gilmore, 1914
- Species: †B. montanensis

Binomial name
- †Brachyceratops montanensis Gilmore, 1914

= Brachyceratops =

Brachyceratops Temporal range: Late Cretaceous, 74.5 Ma

Extinct genus of dinosaurs

Brachyceratops ('short horned face') is a dubious genus of ceratopsian dinosaur from the late Cretaceous Period of Montana, United States. Brachyceratops has historically been known from juvenile remains, with one specimen having since been re-classified as Rubeosaurus ovatus.

== History of discovery ==
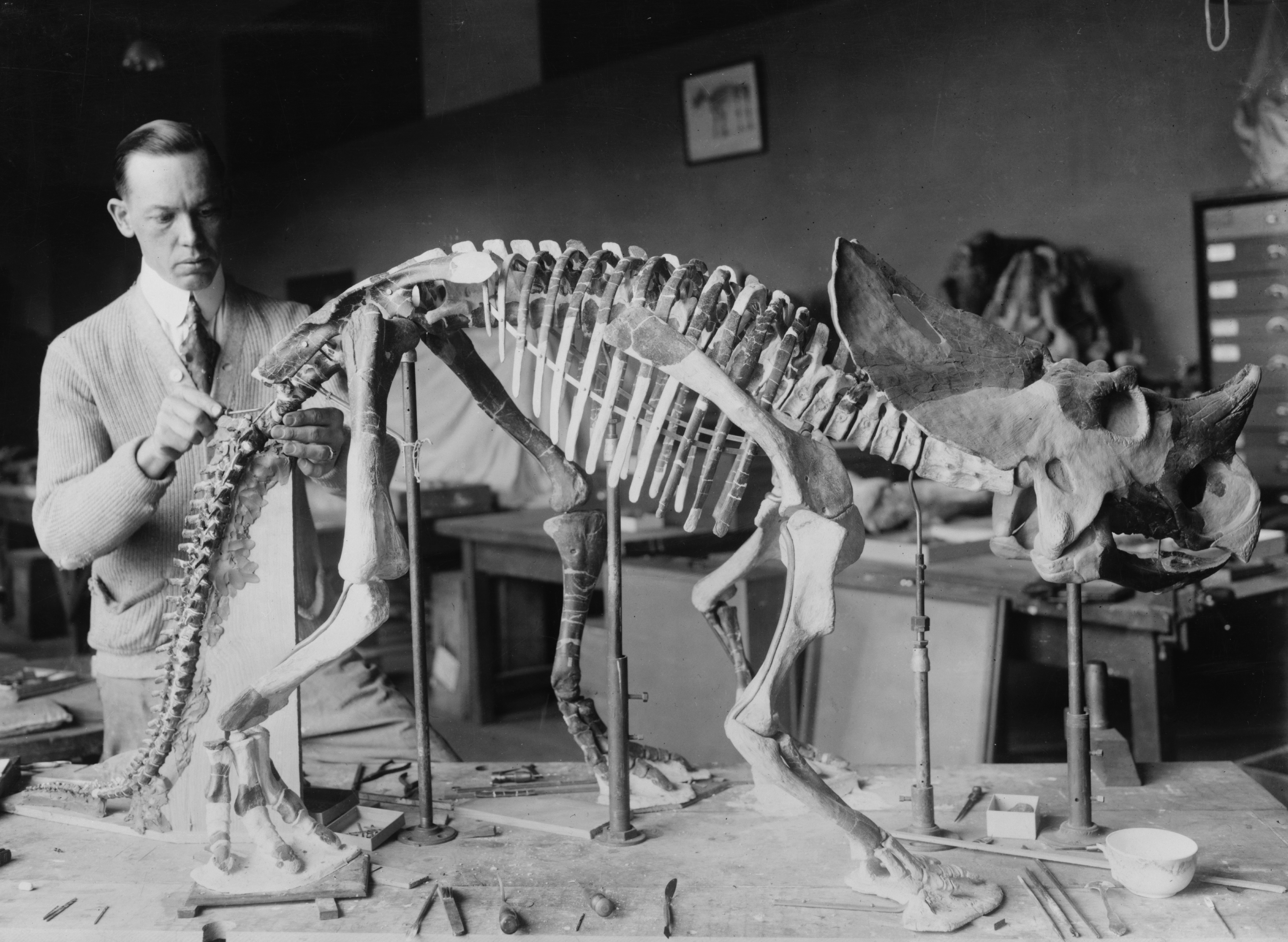
Norman Ross completing the Smithsonian mount

Brachyceratops montanensis, the type species, was first discovered in the Two Medicine Formation (Campanian, about 74 million years old) on a Blackfoot Indian Reservation in Teton County in north-central Montana. The original find was made in August 1913 by C. W. Gilmore and his assistant John Floyd Strayer and was named and shortly described by Gilmore one year later. The generic name is derived from Greek: βραχύς, brachys, "short", Greek: κέρας, keras, "horn" and Greek: ὤψ, ops, "face", in reference to the short snout. The specific name refers to the provenance from Montana.

All that was found were incomplete and jumbled remains of five juvenile individuals of about 1.5 m (5 feet) in length. It has been speculated that these juveniles may have been nest mates that stayed together after hatching. The holotype specimen is USNM 7951, a partial skull. The paratypes are USNM 7952, a snout, USNM 7953, a partial skeleton with skull and USNM 7957, a foot. The material is disarticulated but the preservation is excellent. In 1917 Gilmore published a monograph on Brachyceratops in which a reconstruction of the skeleton as a whole was given.

In 1939 Gilmore referred a larger subadult specimen, USNM 14765, to Brachyceratops. All specimens are currently part of the collection of the Smithsonian Institution in Washington D.C., where a skeletal restoration is mounted.

As Brachyceratops is known only from the remains of five juveniles — plus the subadult that Gilmore found about a mile from the original specimens —, it was long considered likely that these represented the immature forms of known centrosaurine ceratopsians, with Monoclonius often suggested as the likeliest candidate. By 2011 however, several studies had shown that the single specimen which was adult enough to be compared with related species, USNM 14765, represented the juvenile form of the later-named Rubeosaurus.

== Description ==
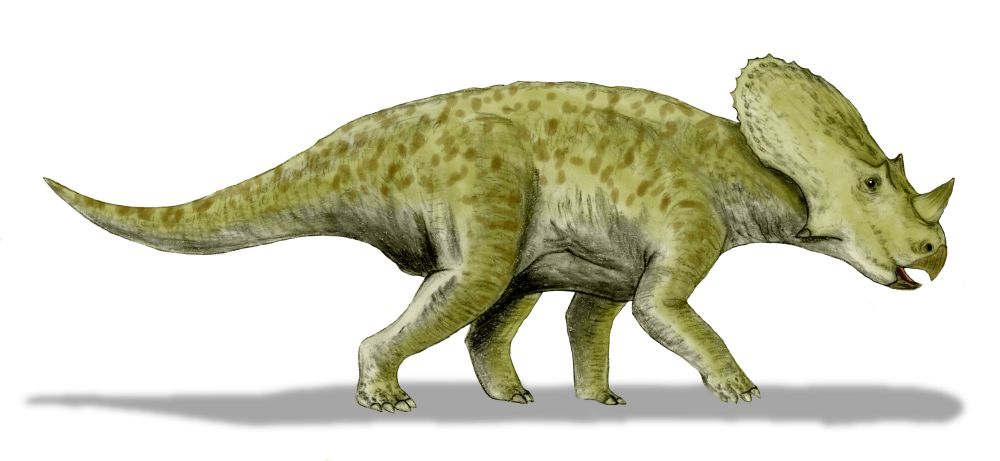
Life restoration

Among the five original specimens parts of three skulls were discovered, detached from their owner's body and fragmented. Despite this, the skull showed that the animal had only small bumps over the eyes rather than full-grown horns like in the more famous ceratopsians such as Triceratops. The nasal horn was thick and low, while its neck frill was moderately large. Unfortunately the specimens were incomplete so it cannot be determined if there were parietal openings in the frill like some other ceratopsians possessed.

== Classification ==
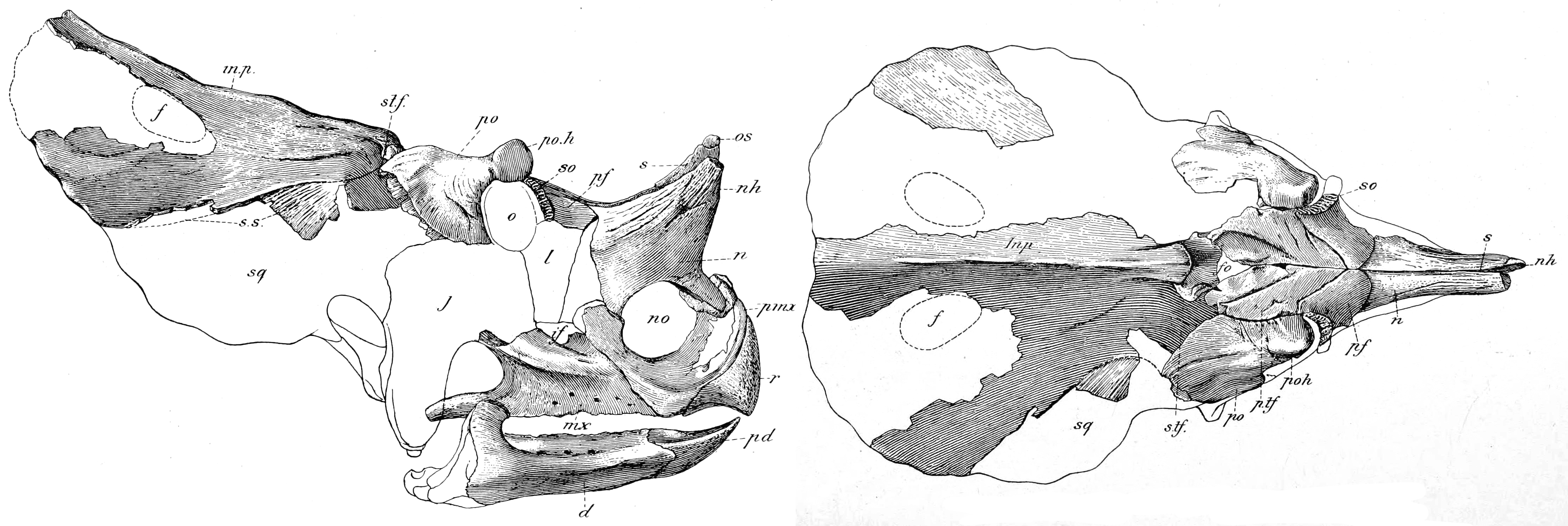
Illustration of the holotype skull from the left and above

Brachyceratops belonged to the Centrosaurinae, but its exact placement has been difficult to discover because it is known only from juvenile specimens. In 1997, Scott Sampson and colleagues re-examined Brachyceratops and noted that it is almost certainly the juvenile form of an already known centrosaurine dinosaur. However, because many features that distinguish ceratopsians from each other do not appear until adulthood, exactly which centrosaurine remained unknown, and Sampson et al. classified Brachyceratops as a nomen dubium, or dubious name. In 2007, Michael J. Ryan and colleagues suggested that Brachyceratops was possibly the juvenile form of Styracosaurus ovatus, which has since been reclassified as Rubeosaurus. A 2011 study supported this idea for the most mature specimen of Brachyceratops, USNM 14765, which shows one unique newly evolved feature (apomorphy) in common with Rubeosaurus to the exclusion of other centrosaurines. However, the same study suggested that because the holotype specimen of Brachyceratops is too incomplete and juvenile to preserve any determinable apomorphies, Brachyceratops must be considered a nomen dubium, and cannot be a senior synonym of Rubeosaurus.

== Paleoecology ==
Dinosaurs that lived alongside Brachyceratops include the basal ornithopod Orodromeus, hadrosaurids (such as Hypacrosaurus, Maiasaura, and Prosaurolophus), the centrosaurines Stellasaurus and Einiosaurus, the ankylosaurs Edmontonia and Euoplocephalus, the tyrannosaurid Daspletosaurus (which appears to have been a specialist of preying on ceratopsians), as well as the smaller theropods Bambiraptor, Chirostenotes, Troodon, and Avisaurus.

== See also ==
- Timeline of ceratopsian research
