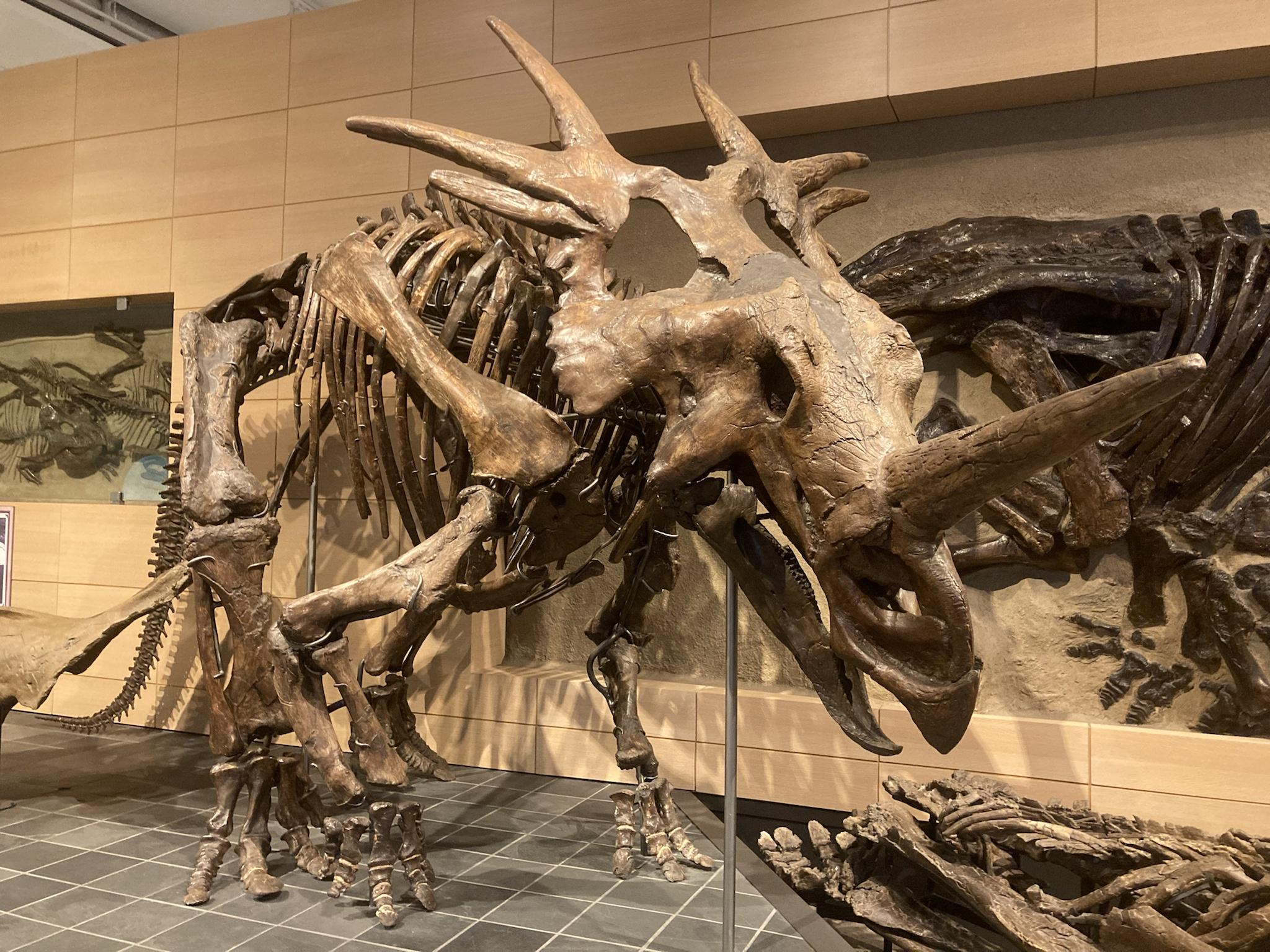
- Holotype skeleton, Canadian Museum of Nature

Scientific classification
- Kingdom: Animalia
- Phylum: Chordata
- Class: Reptilia
- Clade: Dinosauria
- Clade: †Ornithischia
- Clade: †Ceratopsia
- Family: †Ceratopsidae
- Subfamily: †Centrosaurinae
- Clade: †Eucentrosaura
- Tribe: †Centrosaurini
- Genus: †Styracosaurus; Lambe, 1913

Type species
- †Styracosaurus albertensis Lambe, 1913

Other species
- ?†S. ovatus Gilmore, 1930

Synonyms
- Rubeosaurus McDonald & Horner, 2010; S. albertensis synonymy: Styracosaurus parksi Brown & Schlaikjer, 1940; ?Styracosaurus ovatus? Gilmore, 1930; Rubeosaurus ovatus? (Gilmore, 1930); S. ovatus synonymy: Rubeosaurus ovatus (Gilmore, 1930)

= Styracosaurus =

Styracosaurus Temporal range: Late Cretaceous (Campanian), 75.5–74.5 Ma

Genus of ceratopsian dinosaurs

Styracosaurus (/stɪˌrækəˈsɔːrəs/ sti-RAK-ə-SOR-əs; meaning "spiked lizard" from the Ancient Greek styrax/στύραξ "spike at the butt-end of a spear-shaft" and sauros/σαῦρος "lizard") is an extinct genus of herbivorous dinosaur from the Late Cretaceous (Campanian stage) of North America. It had four to six long parietal spikes extending from its neck frill, a smaller jugal horn on each of its cheeks, and a single horn protruding from its nose, which may have been up to 60 centimeters (2 feet) long and 15 centimeters (6 inches) wide. The function or functions of the horns and frills have been debated for many years.

Styracosaurus was a relatively large dinosaur, reaching lengths of 5–5.5 metres (16–18 ft) and weighing about 1.8–2.7 metric tons (2.0–3.0 short tons). It stood about 1.8 meters (5.9 feet) tall. Styracosaurus possessed four short legs and a bulky body. Its tail was rather short. The skull had a beak and shearing cheek teeth arranged in continuous dental batteries, suggesting that the animal sliced up plants. Like other ceratopsians, this dinosaur may have been a herd animal, travelling in large groups, as suggested by bone beds.

Named by Lawrence Lambe in 1913, Styracosaurus is a member of the Centrosaurinae. One species, S. albertensis, is currently assigned to Styracosaurus. Another species, S. ovatus, named in 1930 by Charles Gilmore was reassigned to a new genus, Rubeosaurus, by Andrew McDonald and Jack Horner in 2010, but it has been considered either its own genus or a species of Styracosaurus (or even a specimen of S. albertensis) again, since 2020.

== Discoveries and species ==
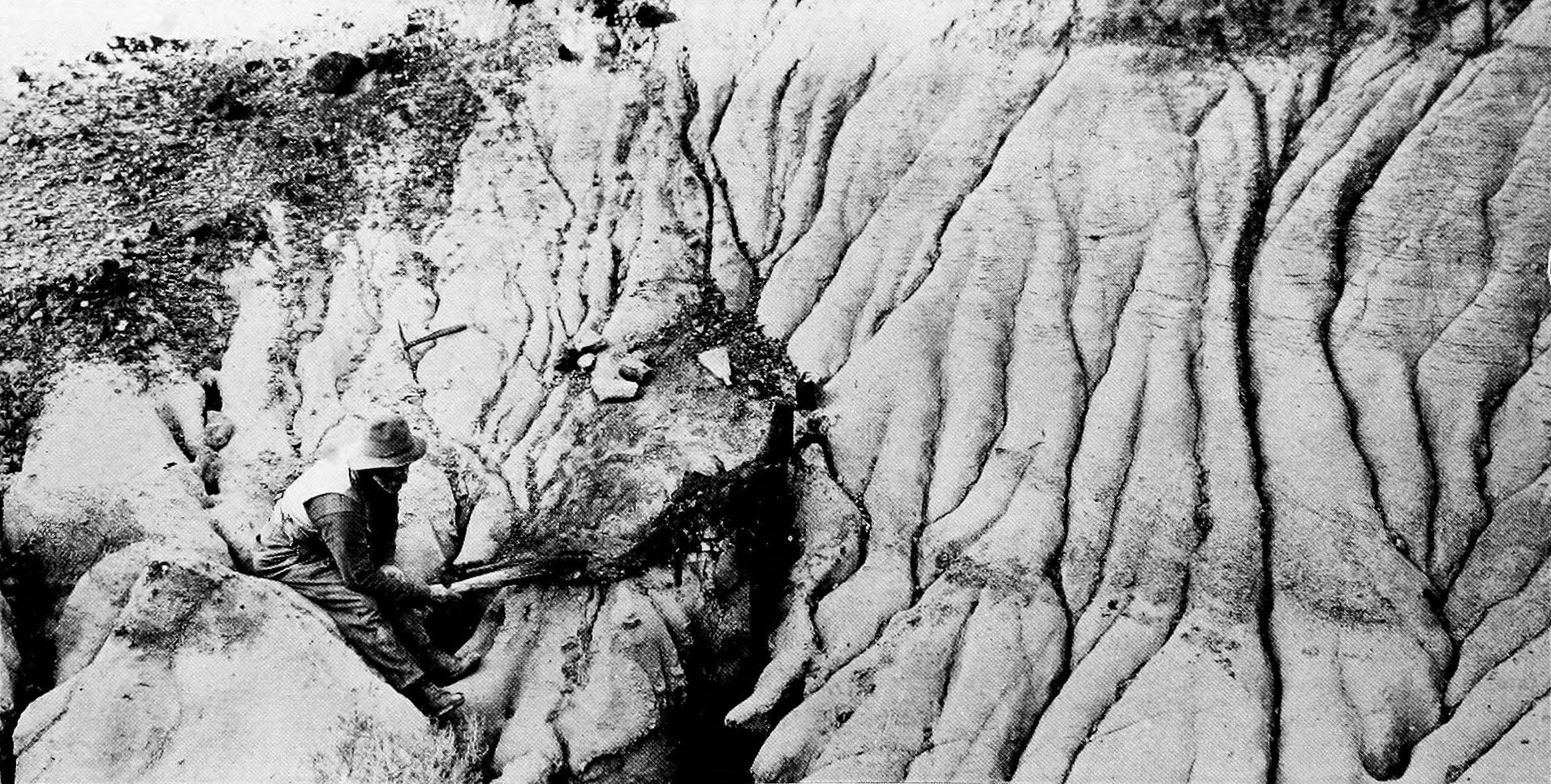
Excavation of the holotype specimen

The first fossil of Styracosaurus was discovered in the summer of 1913 by American palaeontologist Charles H. Sternberg as part of an expedition of the Geological Survey of Canada along the Red Deer River. At the time of discovery it was embedded horizontally with the right side of the skull exposed and weathered, but otherwise largely complete though neither the mandible nor remainder of the skeleton were found at the time. Sternberg discovered the skull on the southwest bank of the Red Deer River about 19 km (12 mi) below the mouth of Berry Creek in what was then called the Belly River Formation. This mostly complete skull was described in 1913 by Canadian palaeontologist Lawrence Lambe as the holotype of the new ceratopsian Styracosaurus albertensis. A second partial skull, including the bones surrounding the orbit found 6.4 km (4 mi) upriver of the type, was also referred to Styracosaurus in a footnote by Lambe.

In 1935, the quarry was revisited by Levi Sternberg, son of Charles H., in part of a field crew of the Royal Ontario Museum, where the mandible and largely complete skeleton of the same individual were excavated. The quarry and sediments are now within the boundaries of Dinosaur Provincial Park and the Dinosaur Park Formation. Negotiations concluded in 1955 allowing the Canadian Museum of Nature to acquire this mandible and skeleton, reuniting the full type individual of Styracosaurus, now under the accession number CMN 344. The skull and skeleton were then mounted on a steel armature, supervised by Charles Mortram Sternberg, son of Charles H., where the vertebral centra were drilled out, elements were welded, and damage or missing bones were modelled with plaster. This mounted skeleton remained on display in the Victoria Memorial Museum Building in Ottawa until the gallery was dismantled in the early 2000's, when the skeleton was disassembled, repaired, and available to be studied.

American palaeontologist Barnum Brown collected another specimen of Styracosaurus in 1915 from the same horizon as the type, but from the middle fork of Sand Creek 19 km (12 mi) downstream of Steveville. Collected for the American Museum of Natural History as AMNH 5372, it was found 76 m (250 ft) above the Red Deer River and initially identified as a specimen of Monoclonius due to similarities in the skeleton. Once prepared in 1936, Brown and American palaeontologist Erich Maren Schlaikjer reidentified it as a nearly complete skeleton and partial skull of a new species of Styracosaurus, which they described and named S. parksi in 1937. The species name was in honour of the late Canadian palaeontologist William Parks, who helped Brown and Schlaijker compare their specimen with the skeleton of S. albertensis that was at the time at the University of Toronto. Another specimen in the American Museum, AMNH 5361, as well as Monoclonius and S. albertensis, were used to help restore the fragmentary skull and nearly complete skeleton for mounting and display. While the locality Brown found S. parksi in was lost for some time, in 2006 it was relocated by Darren Tanke of the Royal Tyrrell Museum of Palaeontology in the upper portion of the Dinosaur Park Formation.

Though Styracosaurus is a relatively rare component of the Dinosaur Park Formation, multiple other partial skulls, skeletons, and a bonebed have also been found. As well as the skeleton of the type, in 1935 Levi Sternberg collected a partial frill from Sand Creek around 3.2 km (2 mi) southwest of the mouth of the creek and 61 m (200 ft) above the river, now catalogued as ROM 1436. Other partial or complete skulls lacking skeletons have been found within the park at Sandhill (or Sand) Creek (TMP 1987.52.1), South Sandhill Coulee (TMP 2005.12.58), Wolf Coulee (TMP 2018.12.23), or along the main river valley in the east (TMP 1986.121.1, TMP 1988.36.20, TMP 2003.12.168). These additional specimens can be referred to Styracosaurus from their large spikes on the frill and have all been found within the upper 30 m (98 ft) of the formation just below the prairie level. A nearly complete skull and skeleton (TMP 1989.97.1) was found in 1989 at Sage Creek only 10 m (33 ft) below the prairie level in the coulee, but approximately 130 km (81 mi) southeast of the holotype and the only definitive specimen of Styracosaurus albertensis from outside Dinosaur Provincial Park. Another nearly complete skull and partial skeleton (TMP 2009.80.1) was discovered in August 2008 and collected in August 2009 by the crew of the Royal Tyrrell Museum in the central fork of Princess Coulee just south of Dinosaur Provincial Park. It is notable as the smallest and likely youngest known Styracosaurus with a nearly complete skull. In May 2015 a skeleton of a large Styracosaurus was found along Matzhiwin Creek near the town of Duchess, Alberta around 18 km (11 mi) west of Dinosaur Provincial Park by the University of Alberta and excavated over three years. The skull of the specimen (UALVP 55900) was described in 2020 but the skeleton remains under preparation and while the locality was lower in elevation than all other Styracosaurus this is from a regional dip in the formation. The University of Alberta also collected the partial skull and skeleton UALVP 52612, from the top of the formation in the eastern river valley of the park.

These fossils indicate that S. albertensis was around 5.5–5.8 metres (18–19 ft) in length and stood about 1.65 metres (5.4 ft) high at the hips. An unusual feature of this first skull is that the smallest frill spike on the left side is partially overlapped at its base by the next spike. It appears that the frill suffered a break at this point in life and was shortened by about 6 centimeters (2.4 inches). The normal shape of this area is unknown because the corresponding area of the right side of the frill was not recovered.

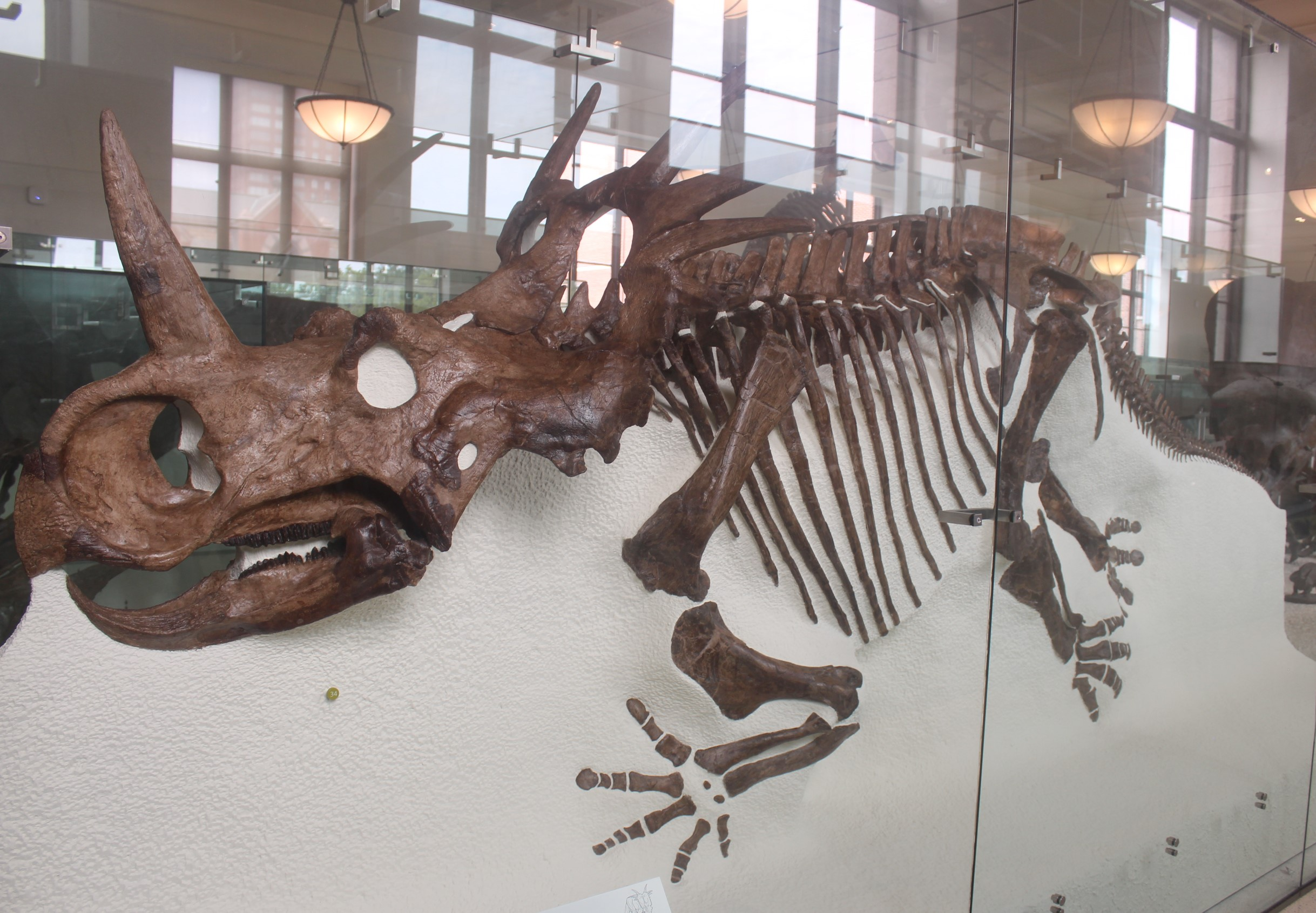
Styracosaurus "parksi" skeleton, specimen AM5372

Barnum Brown and crew, working for the American Museum of Natural History in New York, collected a nearly complete articulated skeleton with a partial skull in 1915. These fossils were also found in the Dinosaur Park Formation, near Steveville, Alberta. Brown and Erich Maren Schlaikjer compared the finds, and, though they allowed that both specimens were from the same general locality and geological formation, they considered the specimen sufficiently distinct from the holotype to warrant erecting a new species, and described the fossils as Styracosaurus parksi, named in honor of William Parks. Among the differences between the specimens cited by Brown and Schlaikjer were a cheekbone quite different from that of S. albertensis, and smaller tail vertebrae. S. parksi also had a more robust jaw, a shorter dentary, and the frill differed in shape from that of the type species. However, much of the skull consisted of plaster reconstruction, and the original 1937 paper did not illustrate the actual skull bones. It is now accepted as a specimen of S. albertensis.

In the summer of 2006, Darren Tanke of the Royal Tyrrell Museum of Palaeontology in Drumheller, Alberta relocated the long lost S. parksi site. Pieces of the skull, evidently abandoned by the 1915 crew, were found in the quarry. These were collected and it is hoped more pieces will be found, perhaps enough to warrant a redescription of the skull and test whether S. albertensis and S. parksi are the same. The Tyrrell Museum has also collected several partial Styracosaurus skulls. At least one confirmed bone bed (bonebed 42) in Dinosaur Provincial Park has also been explored (other proposed Styracosaurus bone beds instead have fossils from a mix of animals, and nondiagnostic ceratopsian remains). Bonebed 42 is known to contain numerous pieces of skulls such as horncores, jaws and frill pieces.

Several other species which were assigned to Styracosaurus have since been assigned to other genera. S. sphenocerus, described by Edward Drinker Cope in 1890 as a species of Monoclonius and based on a nasal bone with a broken Styracosaurus-like straight nose horn, was attributed to Styracosaurus in 1915. "S. makeli", mentioned informally by amateur paleontologists Stephen and Sylvia Czerkas in 1990 in a caption to an illustration, is an early name for Einiosaurus. "S. borealis" is an early informal name for S. parksi.

=== Styracosaurus ovatus ===
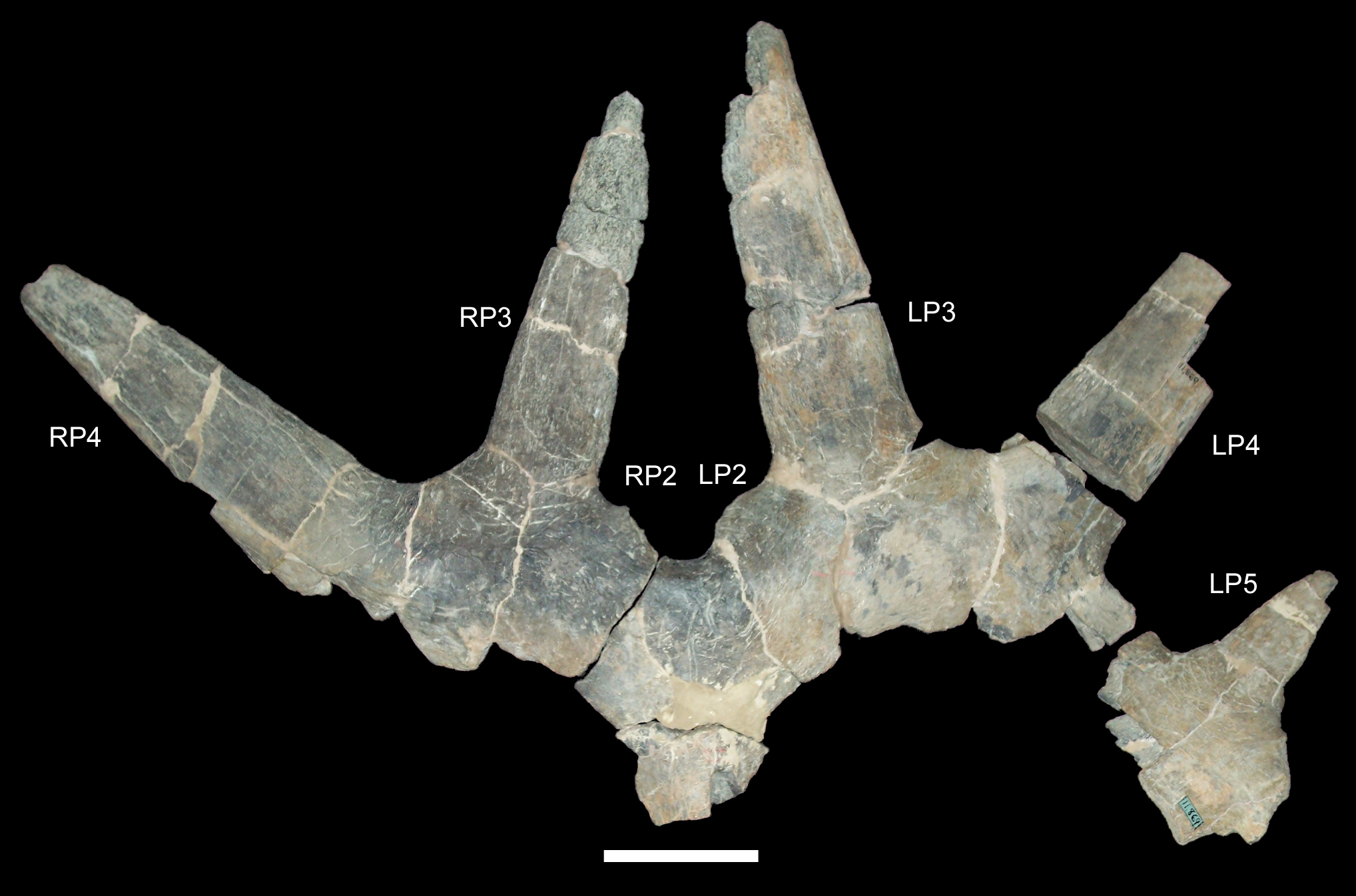
Holotype frill of S. ovatus, which was previously in the genus Rubeosaurus

A species, Styracosaurus ovatus, from the Two Medicine Formation of Montana, was described by Gilmore in 1930, named for a partial parietal under the accession number USNM 11869. Unlike S. albertensis, the longest parietal spikes converge towards their tips, instead of projecting parallel behind the frill. There also may only have been two sets of spikes on each side of the frill, instead of three. As estimated from the preserved material, the spikes are much shorter than in S. albertensis, with the longest only 295 millimeters (11.6 inches) long. An additional specimen from the Two Medicine Formation was referred to Styracosaurus ovatus in 2010 by Andrew McDonald and John Horner, having been found earlier in 1986 but not described until that year. Known from a premaxilla, the nasal bones and their horncore, a postorbital bone and a parietal, the specimen Museum of the Rockies 492 was considered to share the medially-converging parietal spikes with the only other specimen of S. ovatus, the holotype. Following this additional material, the species was added to a phylogenetic analysis where it was found to group not with Styracosaurus albertensis, but in a clade including Pachyrhinosaurus, Einiosaurus and Achelousaurus, and therefore McDonald and Horner gave the species the new genus name Rubeosaurus. Another specimen, the partial immature skull USNM 14768, which was earlier referred to the undiagnostic genus Brachyceratops, was also referred to Rubeosaurus ovatus by McDonald and colleagues in 2011. While the medial spikes of USNM 14768 were too incomplete to show if it shared the convergence seen in other R. ovatus specimens, it was considered to be the same species as it was also found in the older deposits of the Two Medicine Formation, and had a unique combination of parietal features only shared completely with the other specimens of the species.

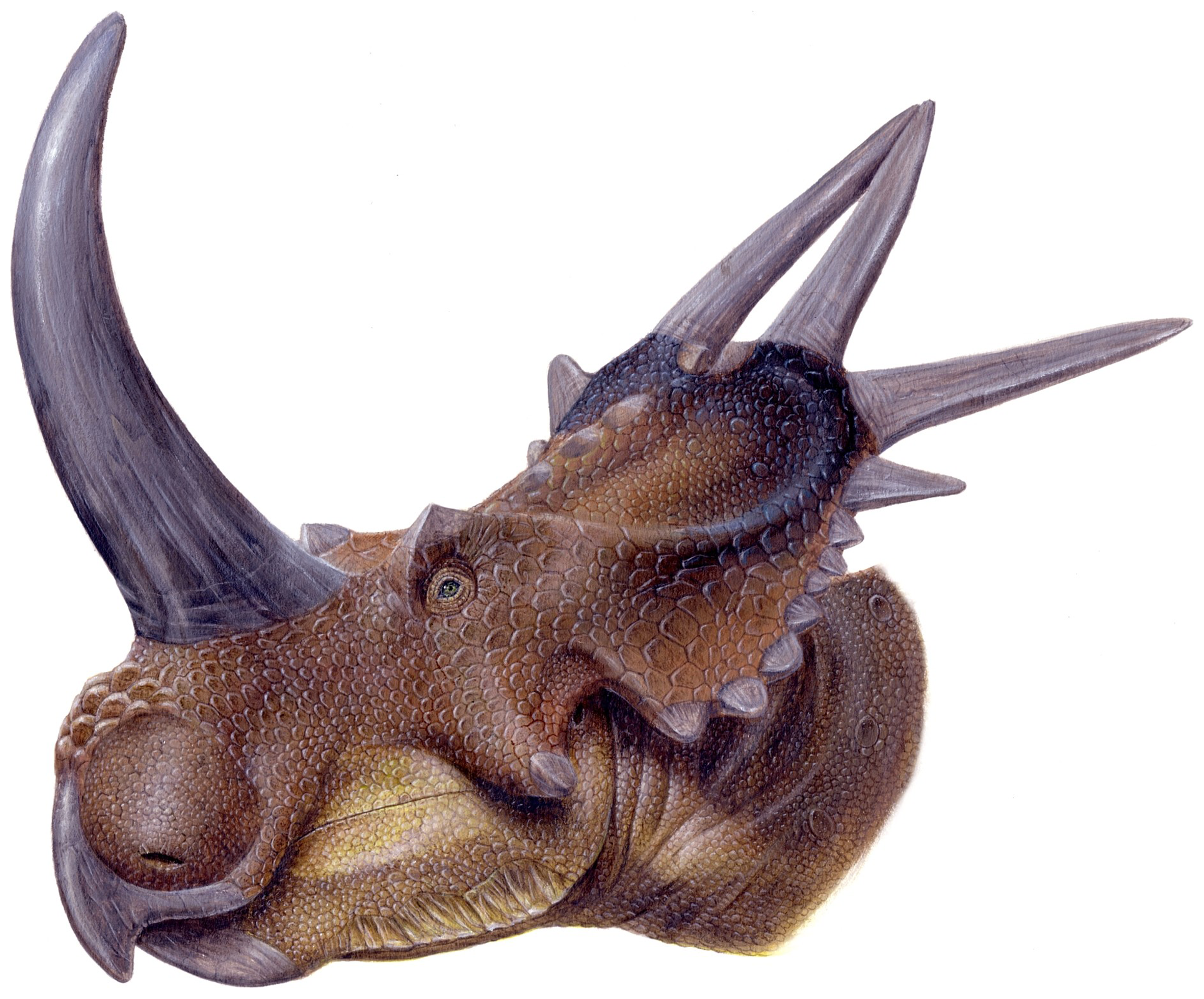
Life restoration of the "S. ovatus" individual

Though it was originally found to nest closer to Einiosaurus and later centrosaurines by McDonald and colleagues in both 2010 and 2011, revisions of phylogenetic analyses in 2013 by Scott Sampson and colleagues, and further expansions and modifications of the same dataset, instead placed Rubeosaurus ovatus as the sister taxon of Styracosaurus albertensis, as had been originally considered when the species was first named, though the two species were not moved into the same genus as originally named. A review of the variability within known Styracosaurus specimens by Robert Holmes and colleagues in 2020 found that USNM 11869, the type specimen of Rubeosaurus ovatus, fell within the variation seen in other specimens from the older deposits of the Dinosaur Park Formation S. albertensis is known from. While no phylogenetic analysis was conducted, previous results of updated analyses showed that Rubeosaurus ovatus and Styracosaurus albertensis were not distantly related, so the justification for naming the genus Rubeosaurus was not present, and the variability in Styracosaurus albertensis specimens also did not support the distinction of Styracosaurus ovatus, with Holmes et al. considering the latter a junior synonym of the former. The conclusion of Holmes and colleagues was supported by a later 2020 study authored by Caleb Brown, Holmes, and Philip J. Currie, who described a new juvenile Styracosaurus specimen and determined that there were several specimens that are otherwise consistent with S. albertensis have been found with inward angled midline frill spikes, though not the same degree as S. ovatus. Though they considered that S. ovatus represented an extreme end of the S. albertensis variation not only in morphology but also as it was stratigraphically younger, they cautioned that at the least the current diagnosis of S. ovatus was inadequate.

Later in 2020, the supposed specimen MOR 492 was redescribed by John Wilson and colleagues, who reinterpreted its anatomy in a way that contrasted McDonald and Horner who referred it to Styracosaurus ovatus. While Wilson et al. agreed that the close relationship between S. albertensis and S. ovatus meant that the genus name Rubeosaurus should be abandoned, they cautioned against synonymization. MOR 492 was moved into its own taxon, Stellasaurus ancellae, which nested alongside Einiosaurus, Achelousaurus and Pachyrhinosaurus in a similar result to McDonald and Horner when the specimen was included as part of the S. ovatus hypodigm. Wilson and colleagues also suggested that the new taxon may have been ancestral to the later forms it was found related to, suggesting that gradual evolution through anagenesis could be the reason for the intermediate morphologies of many specimens and species found in the Two Medicine Formation, possibly also including S. ovatus. As the holotype of Styracosaurus ovatus was found in deposits much younger than the remainder of Styracosaurus specimens, and was considered to have the most extreme morphology while still falling within plausible variation as Holmes et al. had concluded, Wilson and colleagues advised that S. ovatus was retained as a separate, probably directly descended from S. albertensis, species of Styracosaurus. The immature specimen USNM 14768, referred to S. ovatus by McDonald et al. in 2011, was considered too immature to be diagnostic, and thus S. ovatus was limited to its holotype USNM 11869.

== Description ==
Size compared to a human

Individuals of the genus Styracosaurus were approximately 5–5.5 metres (16–18 ft) long as adults and weighed about 1.8–2.7 metric tons (2.0–3.0 short tons). The skull was massive, with a large nostril, a tall straight nose horn, and a parietal squamosal frill (a neck frill) crowned with at least four large spikes. Each of the four longest frill spines was comparable in length to the nose horn, at 50 to 55 centimeters (20 to 22 inches) long. The nasal horn was estimated by Lambe at 57 centimeters (22 inches) long in the type specimen, but the tip had not been preserved. Based on other nasal horn cores from Styracosaurus and Centrosaurus, this horn may have come to a more rounded point at around half of that length.

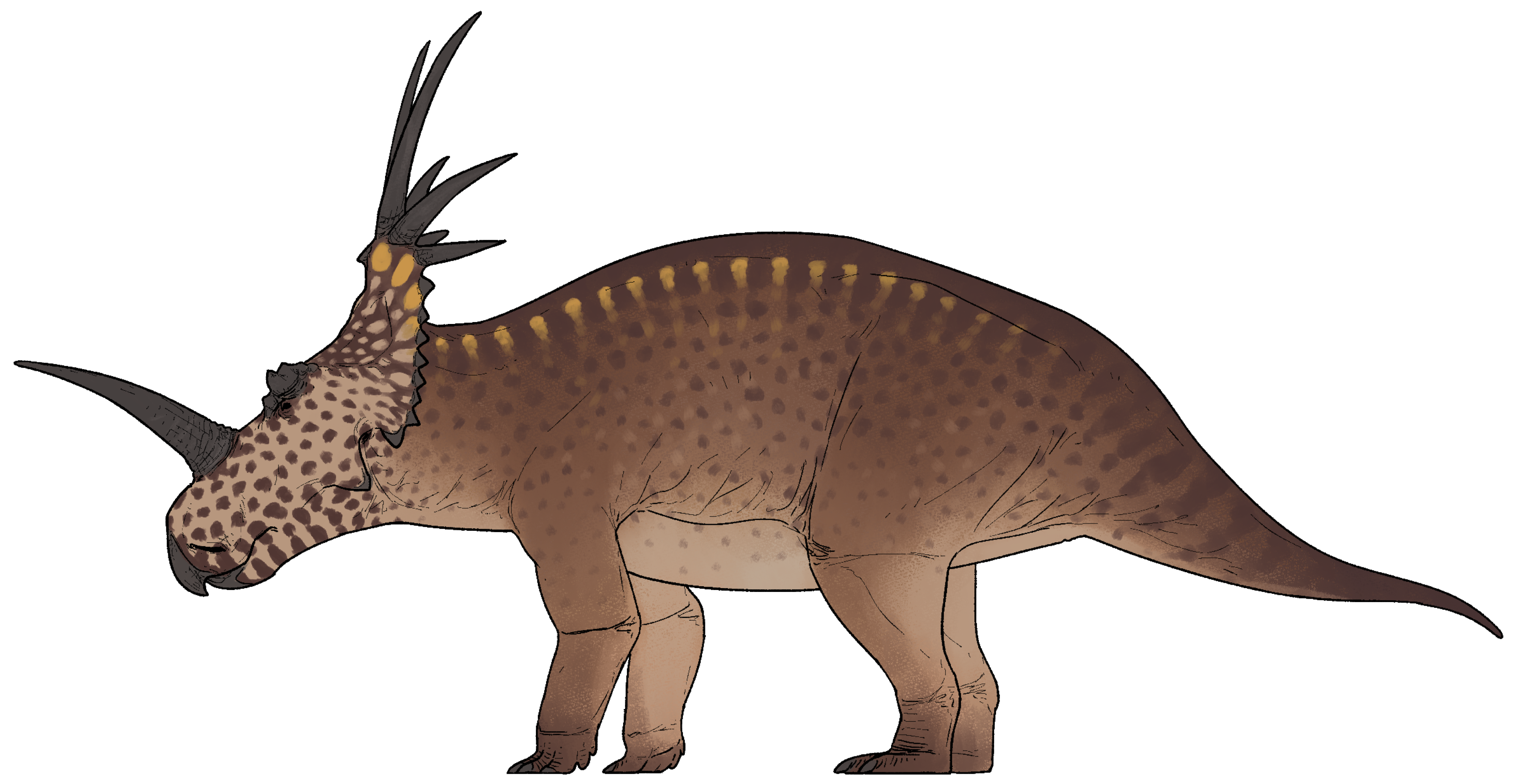
Life restoration

Aside from the large nasal horn and four long frill spikes, the cranial ornamentation was variable. Some individuals had small hook-like projections and knobs at the posterior margin of the frill, similar to but smaller than those in Centrosaurus. Others had less prominent tabs. Some, like the type individual, had a third pair of long frill spikes. Others had much smaller projections, and small points are found on the side margins of some but not all specimens. Modest pyramid-shaped brow horns were present in subadults, but were replaced by pits in adults. Like most ceratopsids, Styracosaurus had large fenestrae (skull openings) in its frill. The front of the mouth had a toothless beak.

The bulky body of Styracosaurus resembled that of a rhinoceros. It had powerful shoulders which may have been useful in intraspecies combat. Styracosaurus had a relatively short tail. Each toe bore a hooflike ungual which was sheathed in horn.

Various limb positions have been proposed for Styracosaurus and ceratopsids in general, including forelegs which were held underneath the body, or, alternatively, held in a sprawling position. The most recent work has put forward an intermediate crouched position as most likely.

== Classification ==
Styracosaurus is a member of the Centrosaurinae. Other members of the clade include Centrosaurus (from which the group takes its name), Pachyrhinosaurus, Avaceratops, Einiosaurus, Albertaceratops, Achelousaurus, Brachyceratops, and Monoclonius, although these last two are dubious. Because of the variation between species and even individual specimens of centrosaurines, there has been much debate over which genera and species are valid, particularly whether Centrosaurus and/or Monoclonius are valid genera, undiagnosable, or possibly members of the opposite sex. In 1996, Peter Dodson found enough variation between Centrosaurus, Styracosaurus, and Monoclonius to warrant separate genera, and that Styracosaurus resembled Centrosaurus more closely than either resembled Monoclonius. Dodson also believed one species of Monoclonius, M. nasicornis, may actually have been a female Styracosaurus. However, most other researchers have not accepted Monoclonius nasicornis as a female Styracosaurus, instead regarding it as a synonym of Centrosaurus apertus. While sexual dimorphism has been proposed for an earlier ceratopsian, Protoceratops, there is no firm evidence for sexual dimorphism in any ceratopsid.

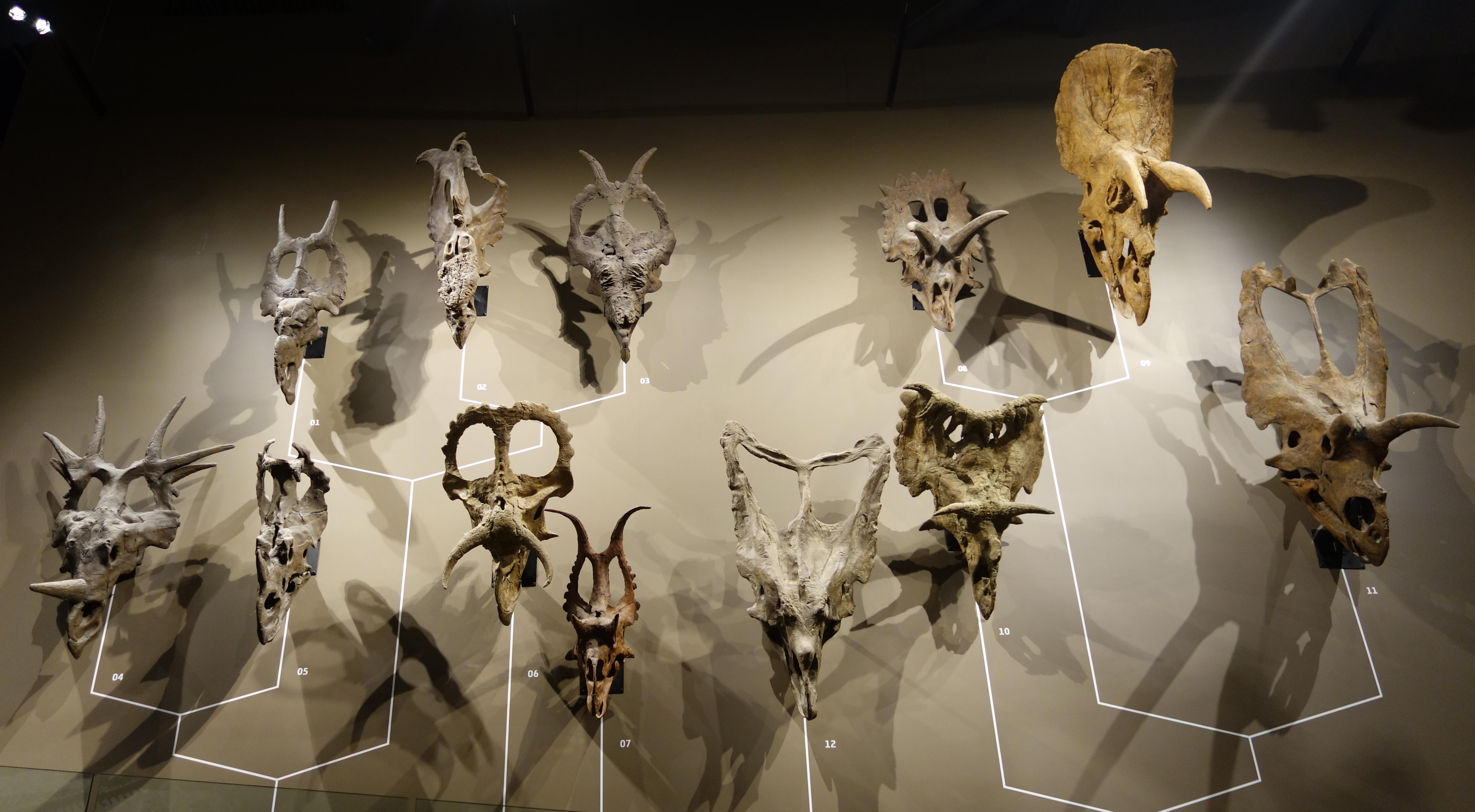
Ceratopsid skull casts positioned in a phylogenetic tree, in the Natural History Museum of Utah, with Styracosaurus at the far left

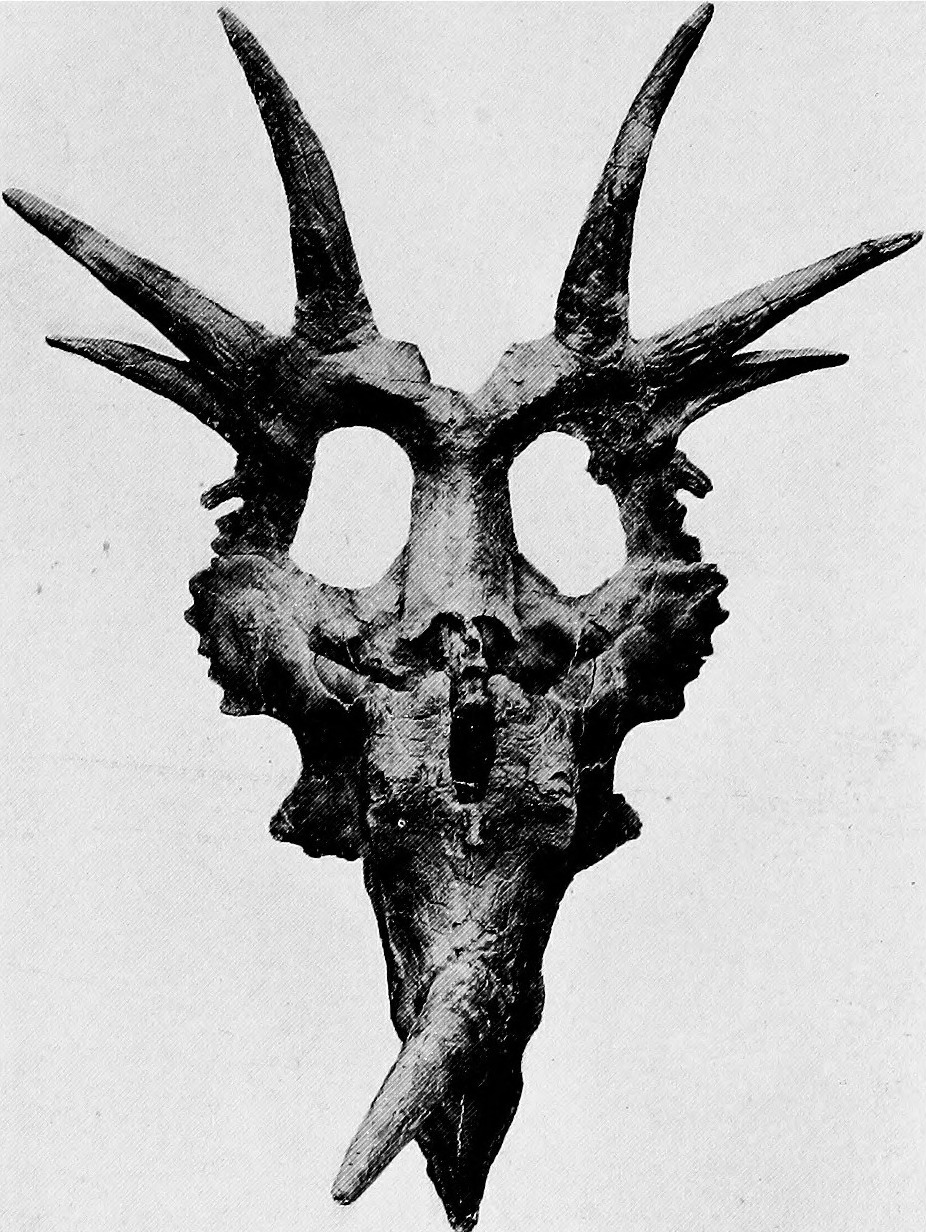
Skull of the holotype specimen

The cladogram depicted below represents a phylogenetic analysis by Chiba et al. (2017):

- Centrosaurinae
  - - Diabloceratops eatoni
    - Machairoceratops cronusi
  - - Nasutoceratopsini
      - Avaceratops lammersi (ANSP 15800)
      - MOR 692
      - CMN 8804
      - Nasutoceratops titusi
      - Malta new taxon
    - - Xenoceratops foremostensis
      - - - Sinoceratops zhuchengensis
          - Wendiceratops pinhornensis
        - Albertaceratops nesmoi
        - Medusaceratops lokii
        - Eucentrosaura
          - Centrosaurini
            - - Rubeosaurus ovatus
              - Styracosaurus albertensis
            - - Coronosaurus brinkmani
              - - Centrosaurus apertus
                - Spinops sternbergorum
          - Pachyrhinosaurini
            - Einiosaurus procurvicornis
            - Pachyrostra
              - Achelousaurus horneri
              - - Pachyrhinosaurus canadensis
                - - Pachyrhinosaurus lakustai
                  - Pachyrhinosaurus perotorum

=== Origins and evolution ===
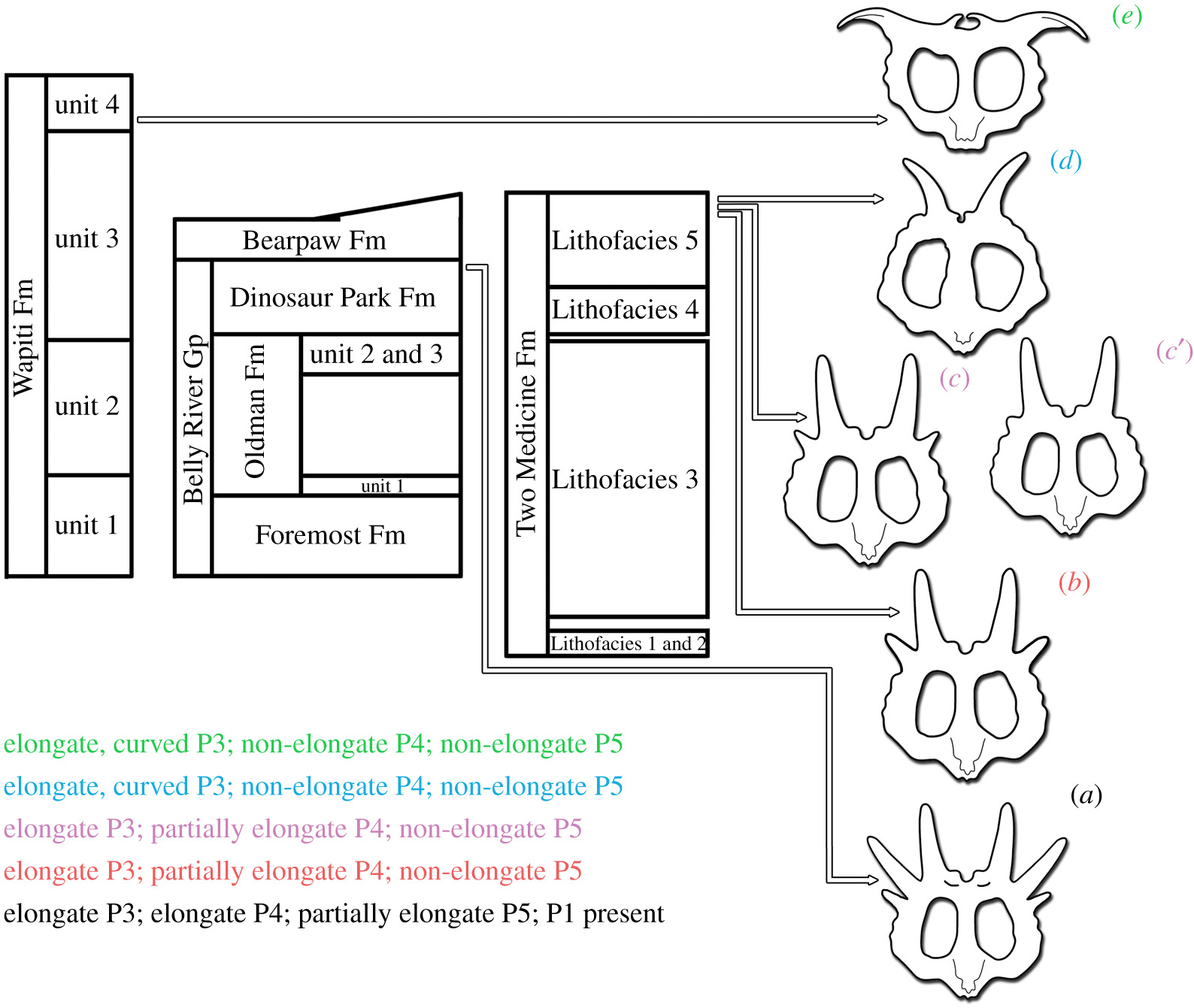
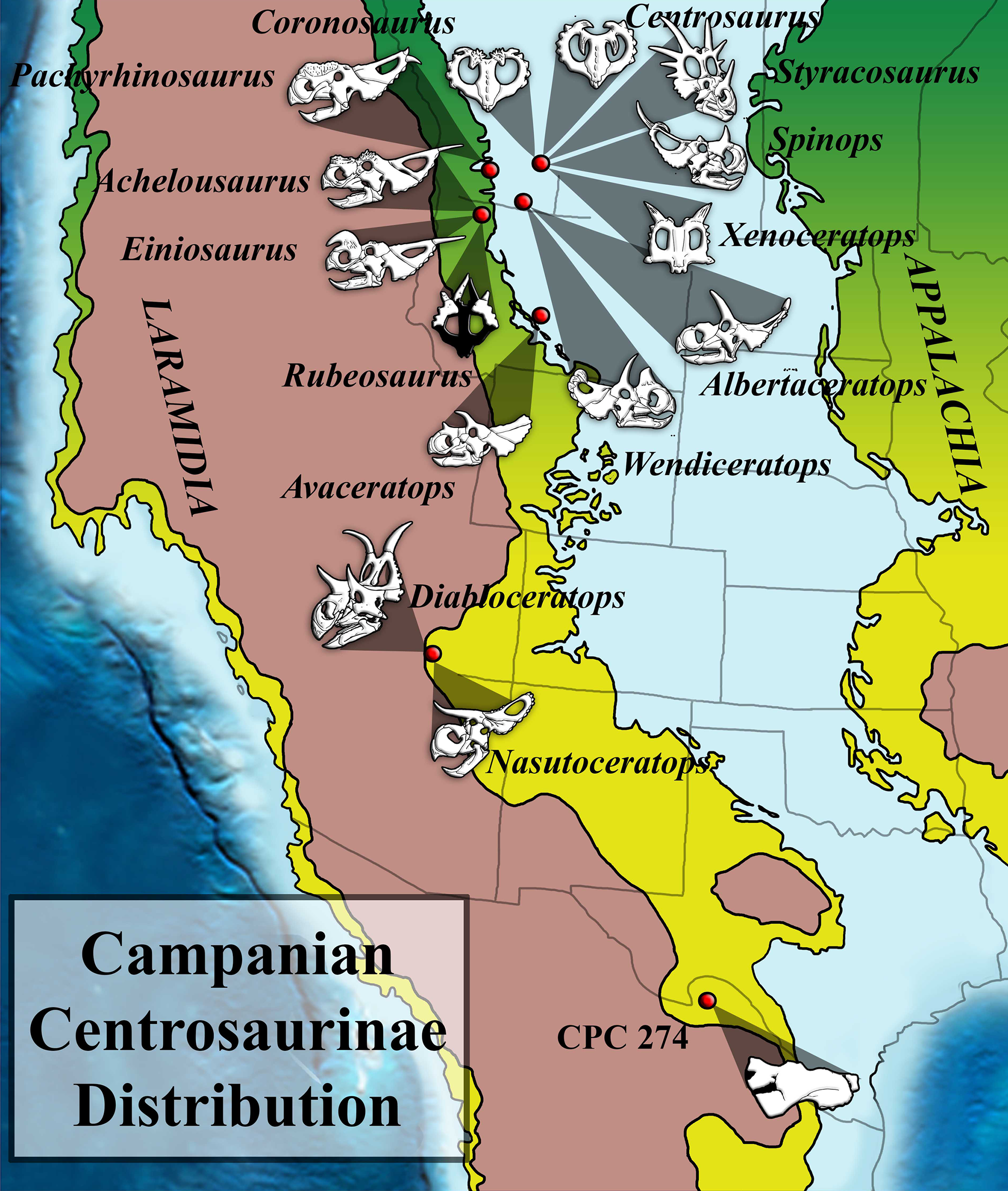
Diagram of proposed anagenesis in centrosaurs, beginning with Styracosaurus (left) and map of centrosaur distribution (right)

The evolutionary origins of Styracosaurus were not understood for many years because fossil evidence for early ceratopsians was sparse. The discovery of Protoceratops, in 1922, shed light on early ceratopsid relationships, but several decades passed before additional finds filled in more of the blanks. Fresh discoveries in the late 1990s and 2000s, including Zuniceratops, the earliest known ceratopsian with brow horns, and Yinlong, the first-known Jurassic ceratopsian, indicate what the ancestors of Styracosaurus may have looked like. These new discoveries have been important in illuminating the origins of horned dinosaurs in general, and suggest that the group originated during the Jurassic in Asia, with the appearance of true horned ceratopsians occurring by the beginning of the late Cretaceous in North America.

Goodwin and colleagues proposed in 1992 that Styracosaurus was part of the lineage leading to Einiosaurus, Achelousaurus and Pachyrhinosaurus. This was based on a series of fossil skulls from the Two Medicine Formation of Montana. The position of Styracosaurus in this lineage is now equivocal, as the remains that were thought to represent Styracosaurus have been transferred to the genus Rubeosaurus.

Styracosaurus is known from a higher position in the formation (relating specifically to its own genus) than the closely related Centrosaurus, suggesting that Styracosaurus displaced Centrosaurus as the environment changed over time and/or dimension. It has been suggested that Styracosaurus albertensis is a direct descendant of Centrosaurus (C. apertus or C. nasicornis), and that it in turn evolved directly into the slightly later species Rubeosaurus ovatus. Subtle changes can be traced in the arrangement of the horns through this lineage, leading from Rubeosaurus to Einiosaurus, to Achelousaurus and Pachyrhinosaurus. However, the lineage may not be a simple, straight line, as a pachyrhinosaur-like species has been reported from the same time and place as Styracosaurus albertensis.

In 2020, during the description of Stellasaurus, Wilson et al. found Styracosaurus (including S. ovatus) to be the earliest member of a single evolutionary lineage that eventually developed into Stellasaurus, Achelousaurus, and Pachyrhinosaurus.

== Paleobiology ==
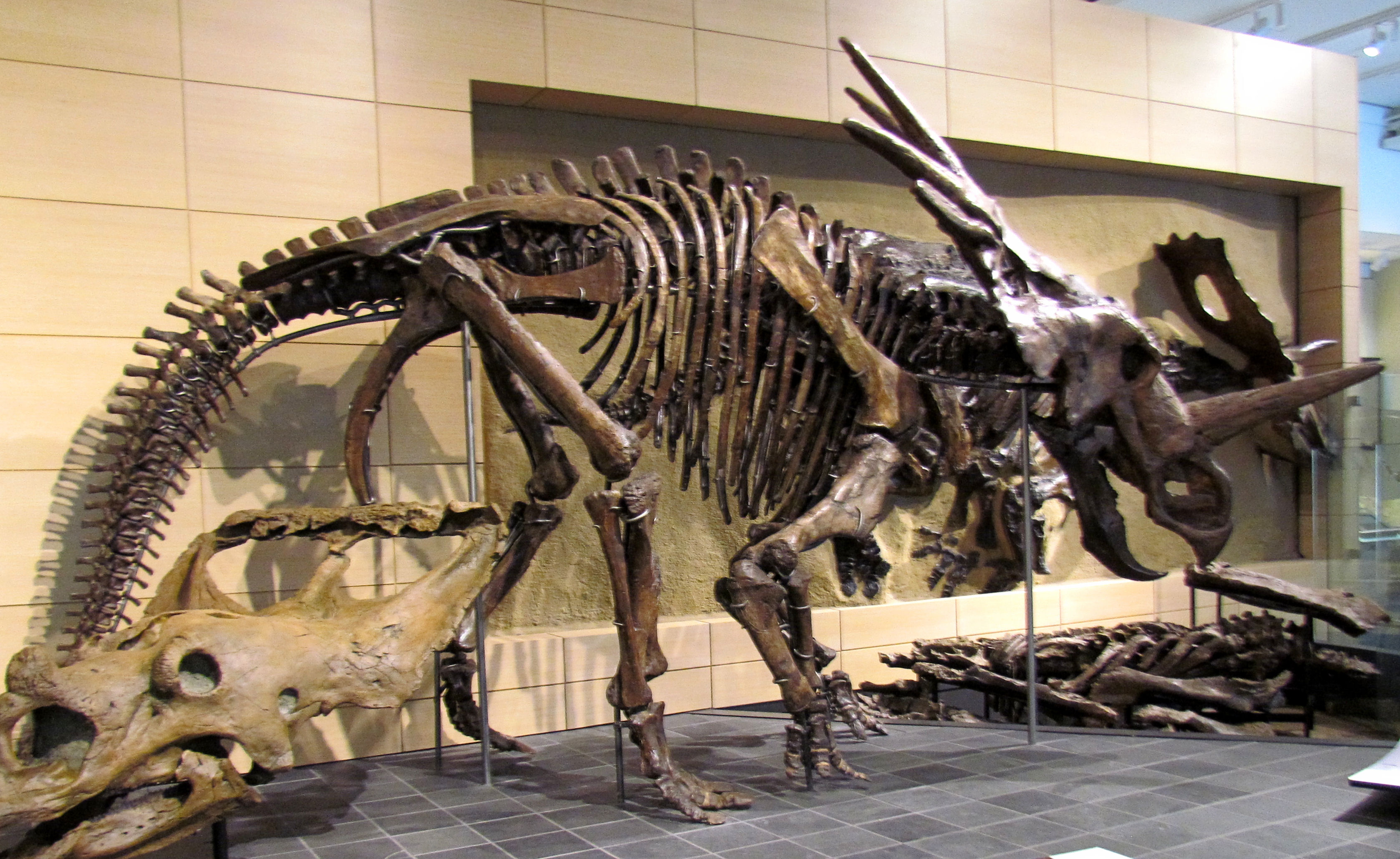
Side view of Styracosaurus mount, showing anatomy of body

Styracosaurus and other horned dinosaurs are often depicted in popular culture as herd animals. A bone bed composed of Styracosaurus remains is known from the Dinosaur Park Formation of Alberta, about halfway up the formation. This bone bed is associated with different types of river deposits. The mass deaths at this site may have been a result of otherwise non-herding animals congregating around a waterhole in a period of drought, with evidence suggesting the environment may have been seasonal and semi-arid.

Paleontologists Gregory Paul and Per Christiansen proposed that large ceratopsians such as Styracosaurus were able to run faster than an elephant, based on possible ceratopsian trackways which did not exhibit signs of sprawling forelimbs.

=== Dentition and diet ===
Styracosaurs were herbivorous dinosaurs; they probably fed mostly on low growth because of the position of the head. They may, however, have been able to knock down taller plants with their horns, beak, and bulk. The jaws were tipped with a deep, narrow beak, believed to have been better at grasping and plucking than biting.

Ceratopsid teeth, including those of Styracosaurus, were arranged in groups called batteries. Older teeth on top were continually replaced by the teeth underneath them. Unlike hadrosaurids, which also had dental batteries, ceratopsid teeth sliced but did not grind. Some scientists have suggested that ceratopsids like Styracosaurus ate palms and cycads, while others have suggested ferns. Dodson has proposed that Late Cretaceous ceratopsians may have knocked down angiosperm trees and then sheared off leaves and twigs.

=== Horns and frill ===
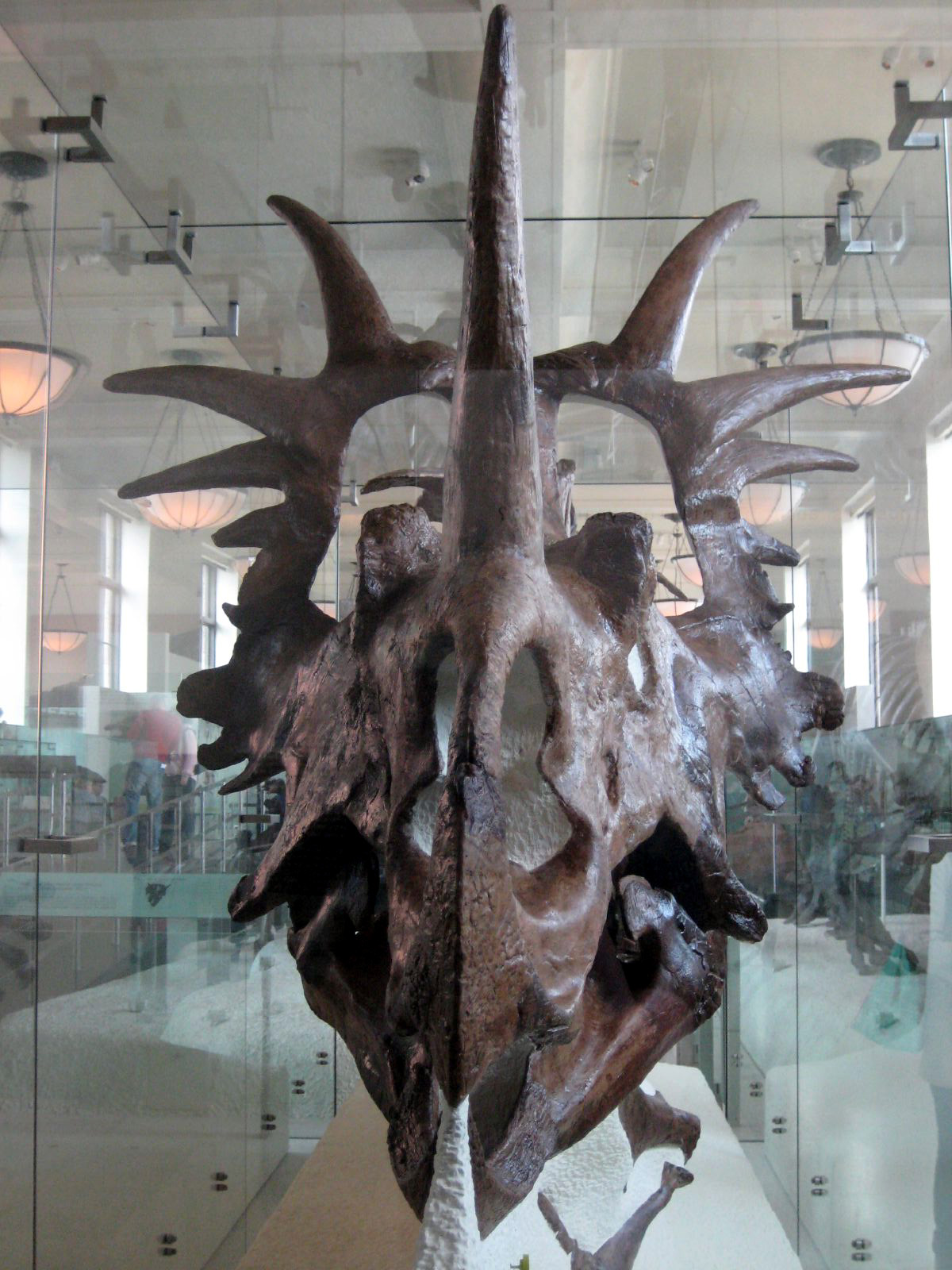
Close-up of the AM5372 skull, American Museum of Natural History

The large nasal horns and frills of Styracosaurus are among the most distinctive facial adornments of all dinosaurs. Their function has been the subject of debate since the first horned dinosaurs were discovered.

Early in the 20th century, paleontologist R. S. Lull proposed that the frills of ceratopsian dinosaurs acted as anchor points for their jaw muscles. He later noted that for Styracosaurus, the spikes would have given it a formidable appearance. In 1996, Dodson supported the idea of muscle attachments in part and created detailed diagrams of possible muscle attachments in the frills of Styracosaurus and Chasmosaurus, but did not subscribe to the idea that they completely filled in the fenestrae. C. A. Forster, however, found no evidence of large muscle attachments on the frill bones.

It was long believed that ceratopsians like Styracosaurus used their frills and horns in defence against the large predatory dinosaurs of the time. Although pitting, holes, lesions, and other damage on ceratopsid skulls are often attributed to horn damage in combat, a 2006 study found no evidence for horn thrust injuries causing these forms of damage (for example, there is no evidence of infection or healing). Instead, non-pathological bone resorption, or unknown bone diseases, are suggested as causes.

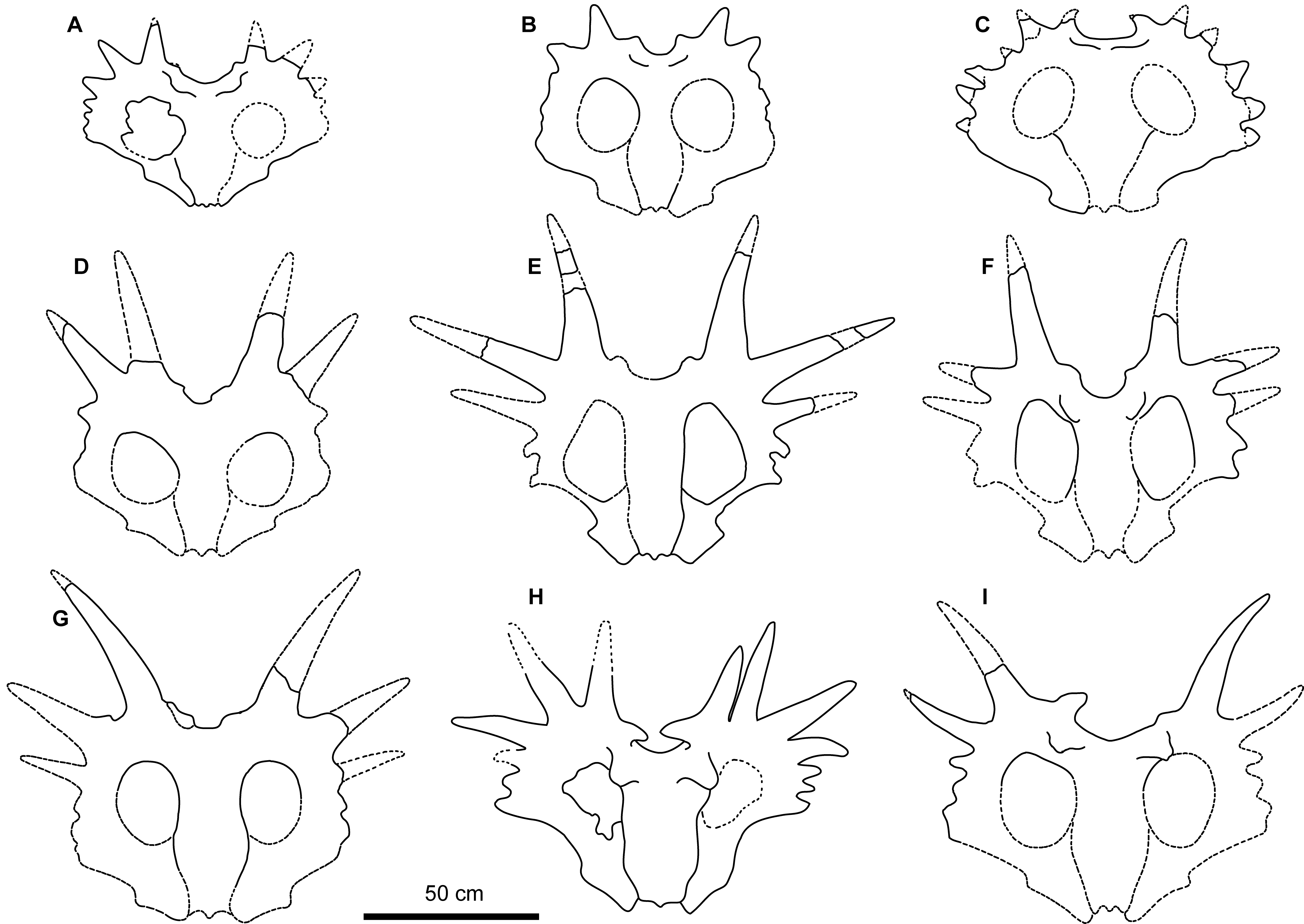
Variation in frill morphology; the top row are subadults, the rest are mature.

However, a newer study compared incidence rates of skull lesions in Triceratops and Centrosaurus and showed that these were consistent with Triceratops using its horns in combat and the frill being adapted as a protective structure, while lower pathology rates in Centrosaurus may indicate visual rather than physical use of cranial ornamentation, or a form of combat focused on the body rather than the head; as Centrosaurus was more closely related to Styracosaurus and both genera had long nasal horns, the results for this genus would be more applicable for Styracosaurus. The researchers also concluded that the damage found on the specimens in the study was often too localized to be caused by bone disease.

The large frill on Styracosaurus and related genera also may have helped to increase body area to regulate body temperature, like the ears of the modern elephant. A similar theory has been proposed regarding the plates of Stegosaurus, although this use alone would not account for the bizarre and extravagant variation seen in different members of the Ceratopsidae. This observation is highly suggestive of what is now believed to be the primary function, display.

The theory of frill use in sexual display was first proposed in 1961 by Davitashvili. This theory has gained increasing acceptance. Evidence that visual display was important, either in courtship or in other social behavior, can be seen in the fact that horned dinosaurs differ markedly in their adornments, making each species highly distinctive. Also, modern living creatures with such displays of horns and adornments use them in similar behavior.

The use of the exaggerated structures in dinosaurs as species identification has been questioned, as no such function exists in vast majority of modern species of tetrapods (terrestrial vertebrates).

A skull discovered in 2015 from a Styracosaurus indicates that individual variation was likely commonplace in the genus. The asymmetrical nature of the horns in the specimen has been compared to deer, which often have asymmetrical antlers in various individuals. The study carried out may also indicate that the genus Rubeosaurus may be synonymous with Styracosaurus as a result.

== Paleoecology ==
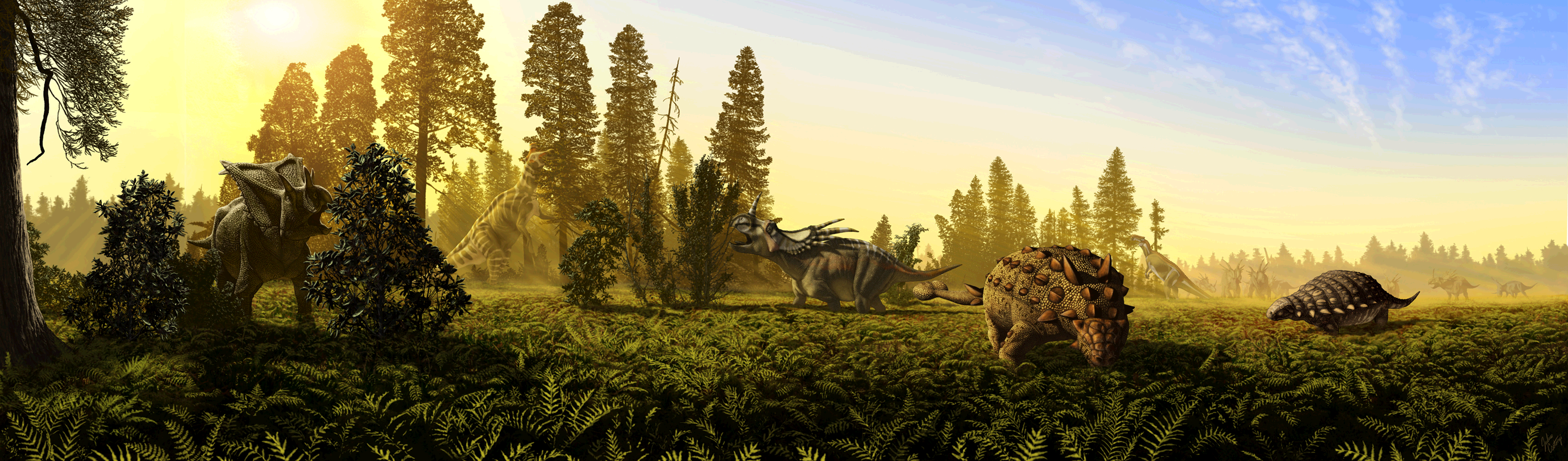
Depiction of the megaherbivores in the Dinosaur Park Formation, Styracosaurus third from left, with herd in the right background

Styracosaurus is known from the Dinosaur Park Formation, and was a member of a diverse and well-documented fauna of prehistoric animals that included horned relatives such as Centrosaurus and Chasmosaurus, duckbills such as Prosaurolophus, Lambeosaurus, Gryposaurus, Corythosaurus, and Parasaurolophus, ornithomimids Struthiomimus, tyrannosaurids Gorgosaurus, and Daspletosaurus, and armored Edmontonia and Euoplocephalus.

The Dinosaur Park Formation is interpreted as a low-relief setting of rivers and floodplains that became more swampy and influenced by marine conditions over time as the Western Interior Seaway transgressed westward. The climate was warmer than present-day Alberta, without frost, but with wetter and drier seasons. Conifers were apparently the dominant canopy plants, with an understory of ferns, tree ferns, and angiosperms.

In the Two Medicine Formation, dinosaurs that lived alongside Styracosaurus ovatus included the basal ornithopod Orodromeus, hadrosaurids (such as Hypacrosaurus, Maiasaura, and Prosaurolophus), the centrosaurines Brachyceratops and Einiosaurus, the leptoceratopsid Cerasinops, the ankylosaurs Edmontonia and Euoplocephalus, the tyrannosaurid Daspletosaurus (which appears to have been a specialist of preying on ceratopsians), as well as the smaller theropods Bambiraptor, Chirostenotes, Troodon, and Avisaurus.
