= Steveville =

Coordinates: 50°50′18″N 111°36′04″W

Steveville is a ghost town in southeastern Alberta, Canada near Brooks. In 1910, the community had a general store. Named after Steve Hall, a local homesteader, the community never attracted a large population. The Hall family operated a number of businesses in Steveville, including a ferry across the Red Deer River, a boarding house, and the general store and post office.

Steveville lies near the northwest boundary of Dinosaur Provincial Park at the edge of the badlands within the Red Deer River valley, and it is most notable as the discovery location for many specimens of dinosaurs. These come from the Dinosaur Park Formation of Late Cretaceous (Campanian) age and include remains of Styracosaurus, Daspletosaurus, Corythosaurus, Struthiomimus, and others.

Amateur palaeontologist Irene Vanderloh (1917–2009) was born in Steveville. In 1974, she discovered the holotype of the theropod dinosaur Saurornitholestes near Steveville.
