= Dinosaur renaissance =

Acceptance of dinosaurs as warm-blooded and birds as avian-dinosaurs

- 1964–1982
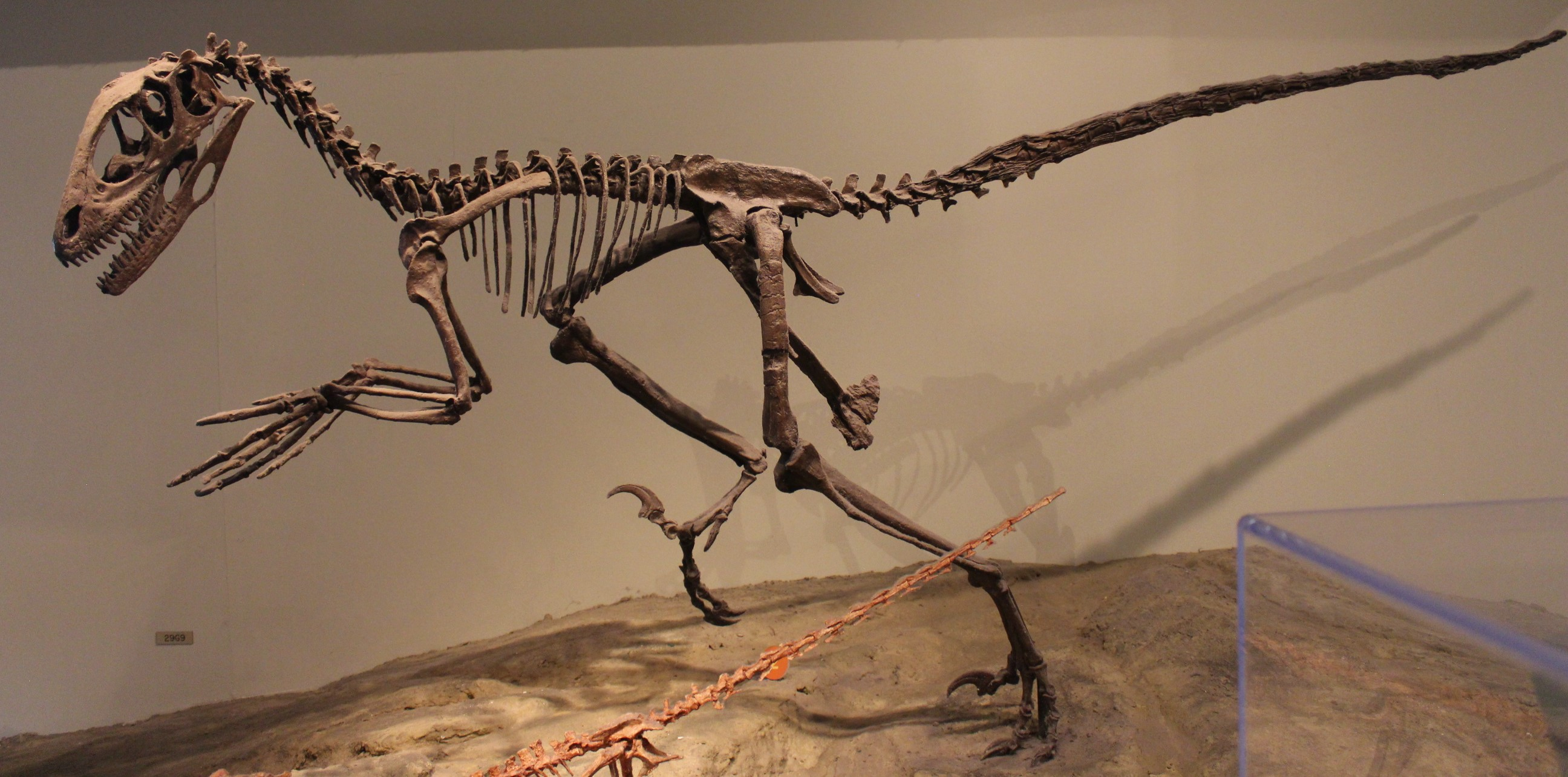
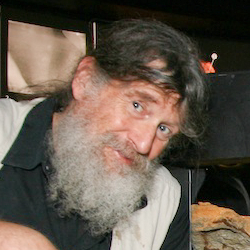
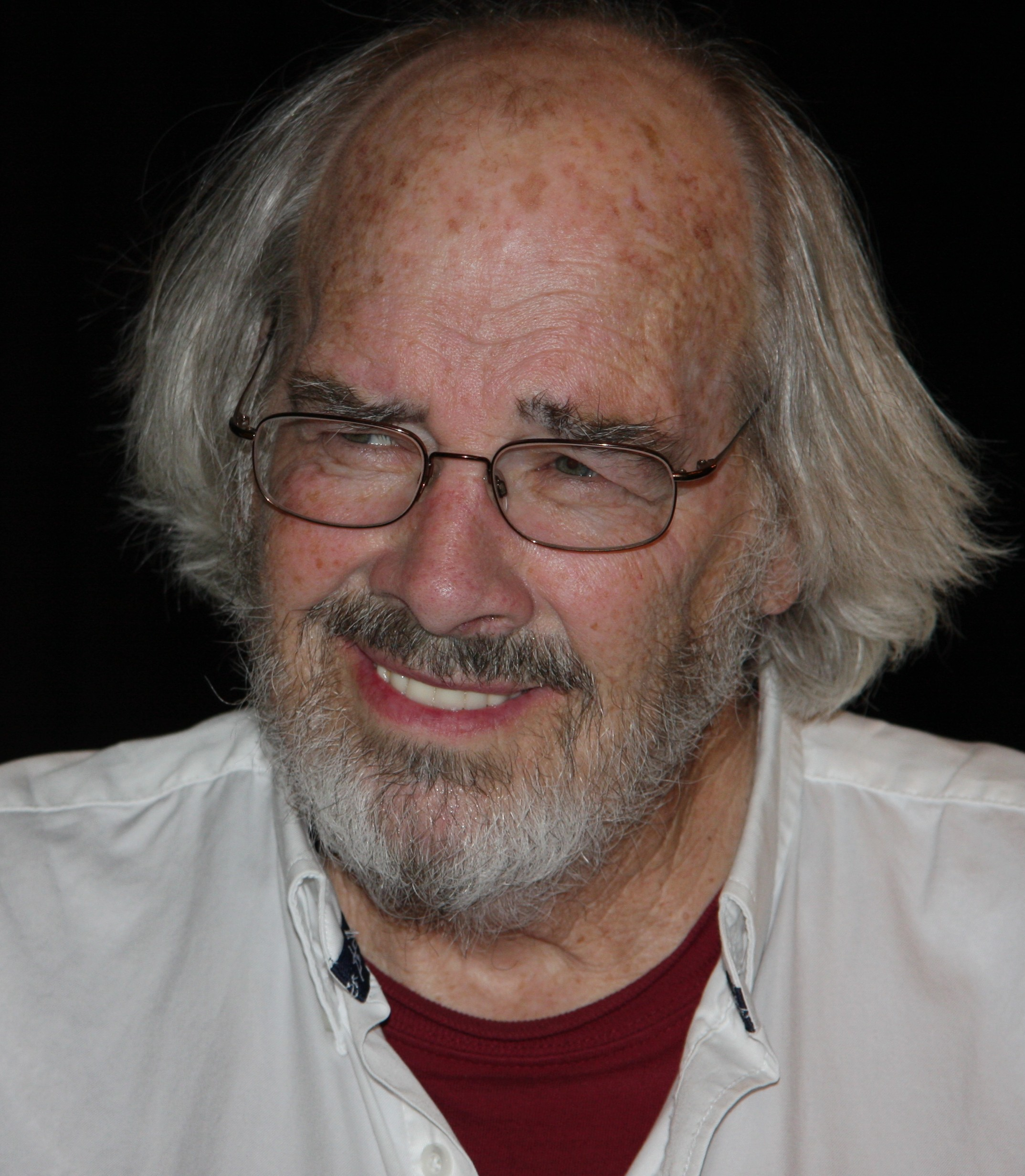
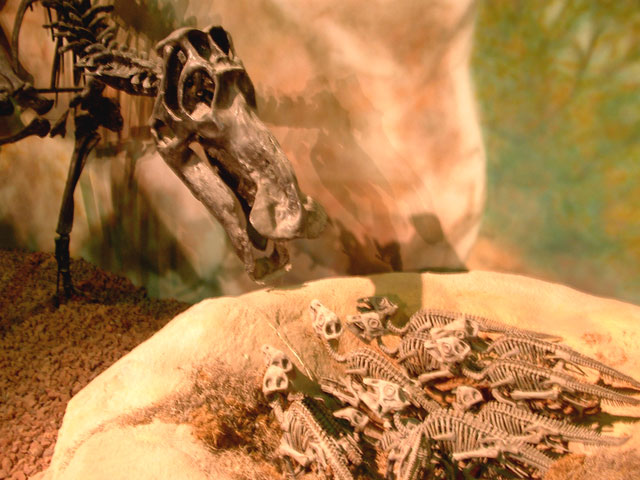
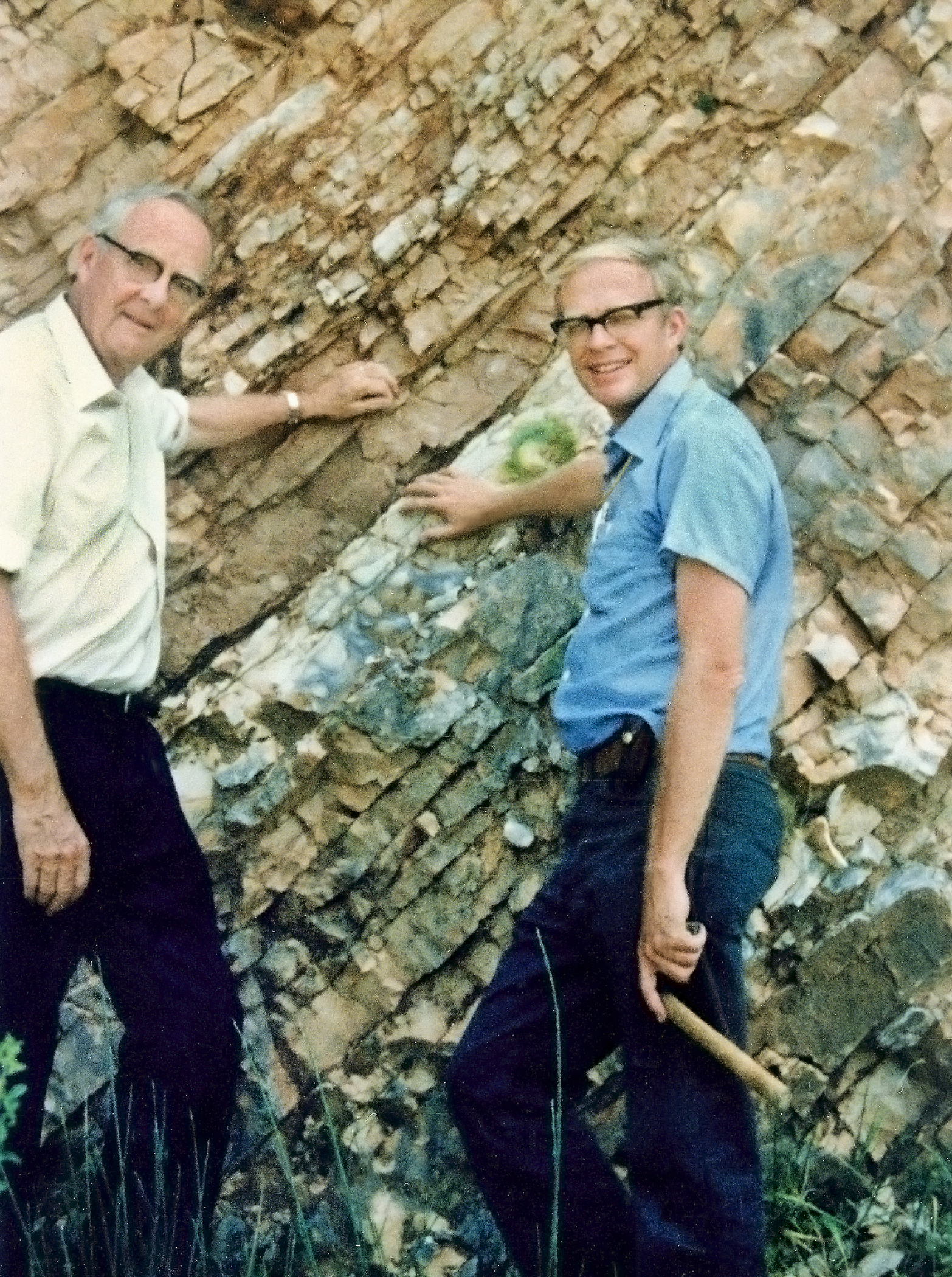
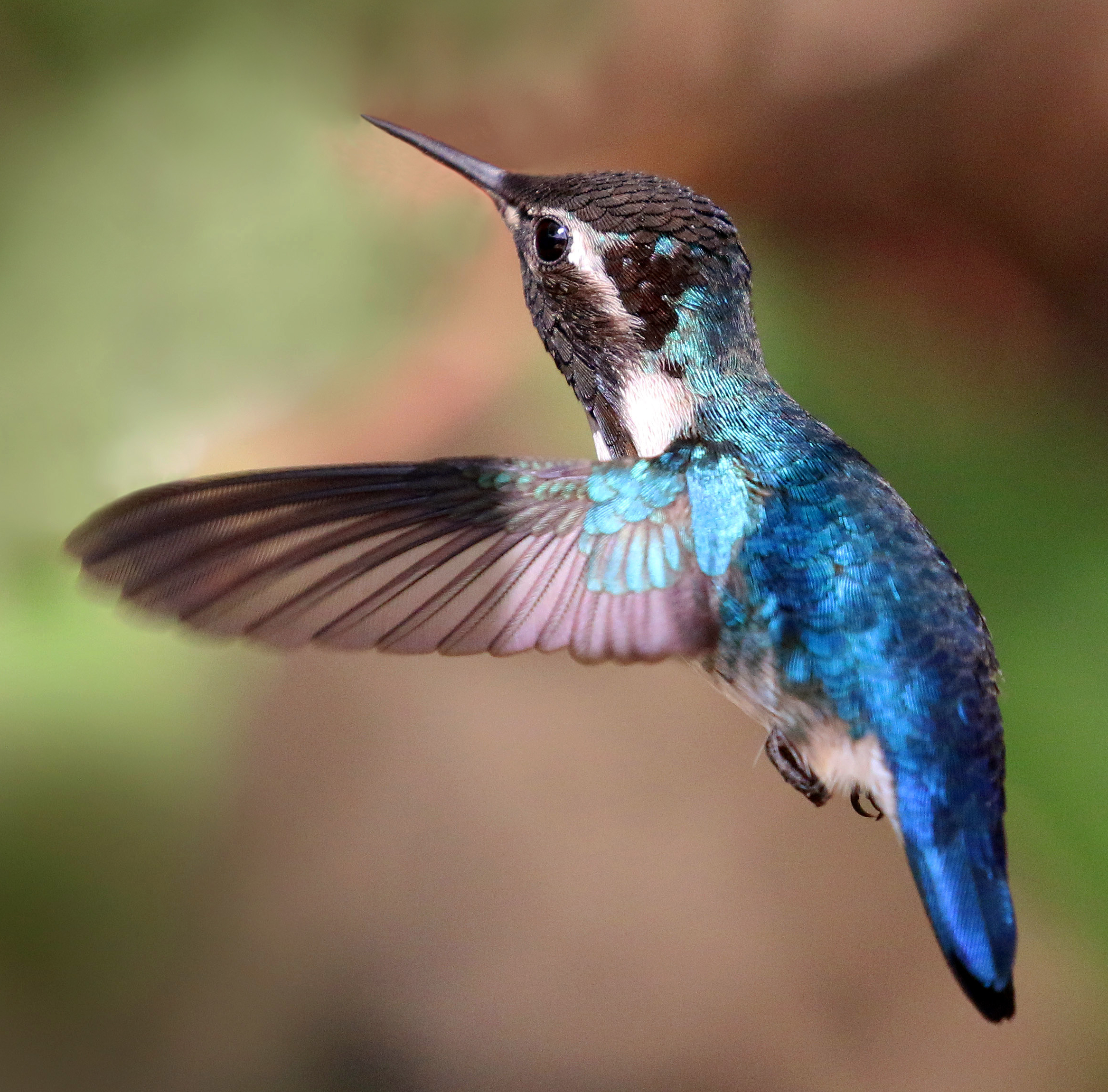
- Deinonychus, discovered in 1964 by John Ostrom, triggered the dinosaur renaissance; Paleontologist Bob Bakker, a pupil of John Ostrom, published a study of dinosaur warm-bloodedness in 1968 and coined the "dinosaur renaissance" term in 1975; Paleontologist Jack Horner (alongside Bob Makela) was the first to discover and describe parental care in dinosaurs in 1978; The 1978-1979 Horner-Makela discovery, here illustrated by a Maiasaura nest, with adult and juveniles; In 1980 Luis Alvarez and Walter Alvarez, father and son, brought back the theory of an asteroid impact causing the extinction of the non-avian dinosaurs; One result of the renaissance is that birds have been recognized as dinosaurs, including the bee hummingbird, the smallest known dinosaur.
- Location: United States
- Leader(s): Proponents: John Ostrom, Robert T. Bakker, Wann Langston Jr., Peter Galton, Jack Horner, Bob Makela, Peter Dodson, Luis Alvarez, Walter Alvarez, Dale Russell, David B. Norman; Opponents: Samuel Paul Welles

The dinosaur renaissance was a scientific revolution that began in the mid-1960s and led to renewed academic and popular interest in dinosaurs. It was initially spurred by research indicating that dinosaurs may have been active warm-blooded animals, rather than sluggish cold-blooded lizard-like reptilians as had been the prevailing view and description during the first half of the twentieth century.

This new view of dinosaurs was championed particularly by John Ostrom, who argued that birds evolved from coelurosaurian dinosaurs, and Robert Bakker, who argued that dinosaurs were warm-blooded in a way similar to modern mammals and birds. Bakker frequently portrayed his ideas as a "renaissance" akin to those in the late nineteenth century, referring to the period in between the Dinosaur Wars and the dinosaur renaissance as "the dinosaur doldrums".

The dinosaur renaissance led to a profound shift in thinking on nearly all aspects of dinosaur biology, including physiology, evolution, behaviour, ecology, and extinction. It also sparked public imagination and inspired many cultural depictions of dinosaurs.

== Dinosaurs and the origin of birds ==
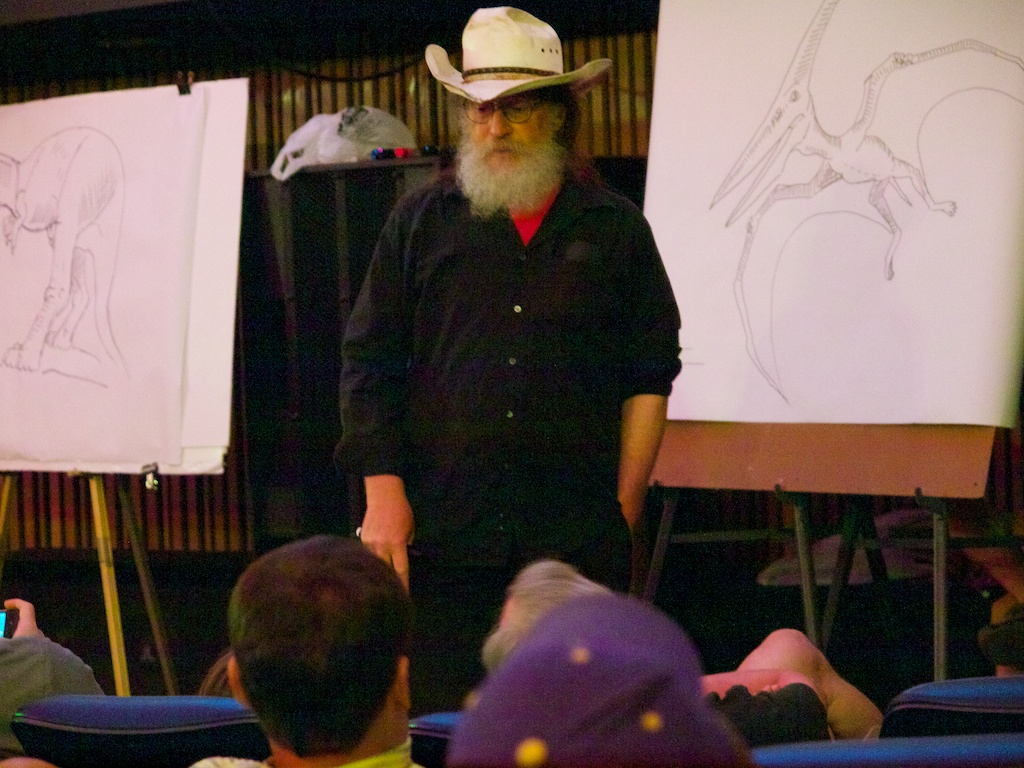
Robert Bakker lecturing at the Houston Museum of Natural Science in 2011

The similarity of the hands of Deinonychus (left) and Archaeopteryx (right) led John Ostrom to revive the link between non-avian dinosaurs and avian dinosaurs, birds.

In the mid and latter parts of the nineteenth century, some scientists thought there was a close relationship between birds and dinosaurs, and that dinosaurs represented an intermediate stage between "reptiles" and birds.

Shortly after the 1859 publication of Charles Darwin's The Origin of Species, British biologist and evolution-defender Thomas Henry Huxley proposed that birds were descendants of dinosaurs. He cited skeletal similarities, particularly among dinosaurs, the "first bird"—Archaeopteryx—and modern birds. However, in 1926, Gerhard Heilmann wrote his influential book The Origin of Birds, in which he dismissed the dinosaur–bird link, based on the dinosaurs' supposed lack of a furcula. Thereafter, the accepted hypothesis was that birds evolved from crocodylomorph and thecodont ancestors, rather than from dinosaurs.

This situation persisted until 1964, when John Ostrom discovered a small carnivorous dinosaur which he named Deinonychus antirrhopus, a theropod whose skeletal resemblance to birds seemed unmistakable. This led Ostrom to argue that Huxley had been right, and that birds had indeed evolved from dinosaurs. Although it was Deinonychus that inspired Ostrom to connect birds with dinosaurs, very similar birdlike dinosaurs, such as Velociraptor, had been known for many decades, but no connection had been made. After Ostrom's discoveries, the idea that birds are dinosaurs gained support among palaeontologists, and today it is almost universally accepted.

== Dinosaur monophyly ==
Around 1880, dinosaurs were largely treated as a monophyletic group (i.e., having a last common ancestor not shared with other reptiles). However, Harry Seeley disagreed with this interpretation and split the Dinosauria into two orders, the Saurischia ("lizard-hipped") and the Ornithischia ("bird-hipped"), which were seen as members of the Archosauria with no special relationship to each other. As such, the Dinosauria was no longer seen as a scientific grouping, and "dinosaur" was reduced to being a popular term, without scientific meaning. This became the standard interpretation throughout much of the twentieth century.

This changed in 1974, when Bakker and Peter Galton published a paper in Nature, arguing that not only were dinosaurs a natural monophyletic group, but that they should be raised to the status of a new class, which would also contain birds. Although initially this revival of dinosaur monophyly was controversial, the idea did gain acceptance, and since the rise of cladistic methodology, it has been nearly universally supported.

== Warm-bloodedness and activity levels ==
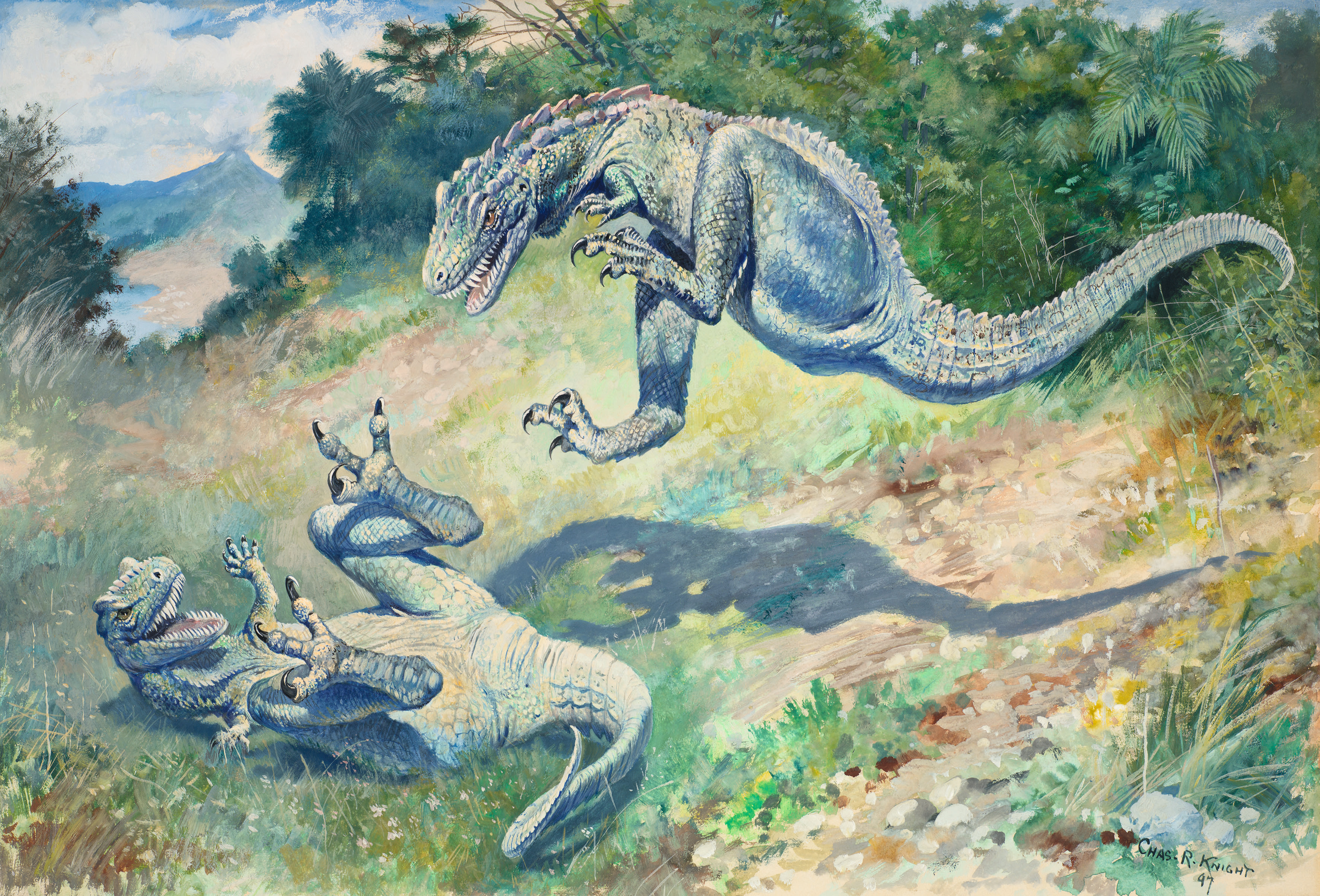
An 1897 painting of "Laelaps" (now Dryptosaurus) by Charles R. Knight. Bakker pointed to such restorations to demonstrate that in the 19th century, it was widely accepted that dinosaurs may have been active and agile animals.

In a series of scientific papers, books, and popular articles in the 1970s and 1980s, beginning with his 1968 paper "The superiority of dinosaurs", Robert Bakker argued strenuously that dinosaurs were warm-blooded and active animals, capable of sustained periods of high activity. In most of his writings, Bakker framed his arguments as new evidence leading to a revival of ideas popular in the late 19th century, frequently referring to an ongoing "dinosaur renaissance". He used a variety of anatomical and statistical arguments to defend his case, the methodology of which was fiercely debated among scientists.

These debates sparked interest in new methods for ascertaining the palaeobiology of extinct animals, such as bone histology, which have been successfully applied to determining the growth-rates of many dinosaurs. Today, it is generally thought that many or perhaps all dinosaurs had higher metabolic rates than living reptiles, but also that the situation is more complex and varied than Bakker originally proposed. For example, while smaller dinosaurs may have been true endotherms, the larger forms could have been inertial homeotherms, or many dinosaurs could have had intermediate metabolic rates.

== New theories on dinosaur behaviour ==
The late 1960s also saw several new theories on the way dinosaurs behaved, often involving sophisticated social behaviour. On the basis of trackways, Bakker argued that sauropod dinosaurs moved in structured herds, with the adults surrounding the juveniles in a protective ring. However, shortly afterwards, this particular interpretation was challenged by Ostrom among others, although the venerable dinosaur track expert Roland T. Bird apparently agreed with Bakker.

The first rigorous study of dinosaur nesting behaviour came in the late 1970s, when palaeontologists Bob Makela and Jack Horner showed that the duckbilled dinosaur Maiasaura cared for its young. In 1978 Makela and Horner have found in Choteau, Montana, a fossilised nesting ground so rich in whole eggs and eggshell pieces that the site earned its current name of "Egg Mountain".

== Changing portrayal of dinosaurs ==
The dinosaur renaissance changed not only scientific ideas about dinosaurs, but also their portrayal by artists. Bakker's illustration of Deinonychus, made for Ostrom's 1969 description, has become one of the most referenced dinosaur restorations.

During the 1970s, restorations of dinosaurs shifted from being lizard-like to being more mammal- and bird-like. Artists started to show dinosaurs in more active poses and incorporated newer theories of dinosaur locomotion and behaviour. Tails that were widely shown as having been dragged behind a creature were now shown uplifted in order to balance the huge bodies while active.

Besides Bakker, key artists in this "new wave" were first Mark Hallett, Gregory S. Paul in the 1970s, and during the 1980s Doug Henderson and John Gurche.

Gregory Paul, in particular, defended and expanded on Bakker's ideas on dinosaur anatomy. He expounded a rigorous and detailed approach to dinosaur restoration, in which he often criticised the errors of the traditionalist approach. He also produced a large number of restorations showing small dinosaurs with feathers, and defended the idea in a number of articles and his book Predatory Dinosaurs of the World. His view was proven largely correct in the late 1990s with the discovery of several feathered dinosaurs. Paul's ideas and style have had a significant impact on dinosaur art.

== New extinction theories, the meteor impact ==
Traditionally, paleontology had followed geology in preferring uniformitarian mechanisms, despite the promotion by Eugene Merle Shoemaker of the importance of catastrophic impacts. During the renaissance period Walter Alvarez and others found iridium in the Cretaceous–Tertiary boundary layer. Also, the Chicxulub Crater was identified and determined to be due to a meteor impact. These discoveries led to the acceptance and popularisation of the idea that the extinction had been caused by an impact event. This, in turn, undermined the assumption that dinosaurs had become extinct because they were inferior to mammals. Instead, it suggested they had fallen prey to a random event which no large animal could have survived.

== Dinosauroid ==
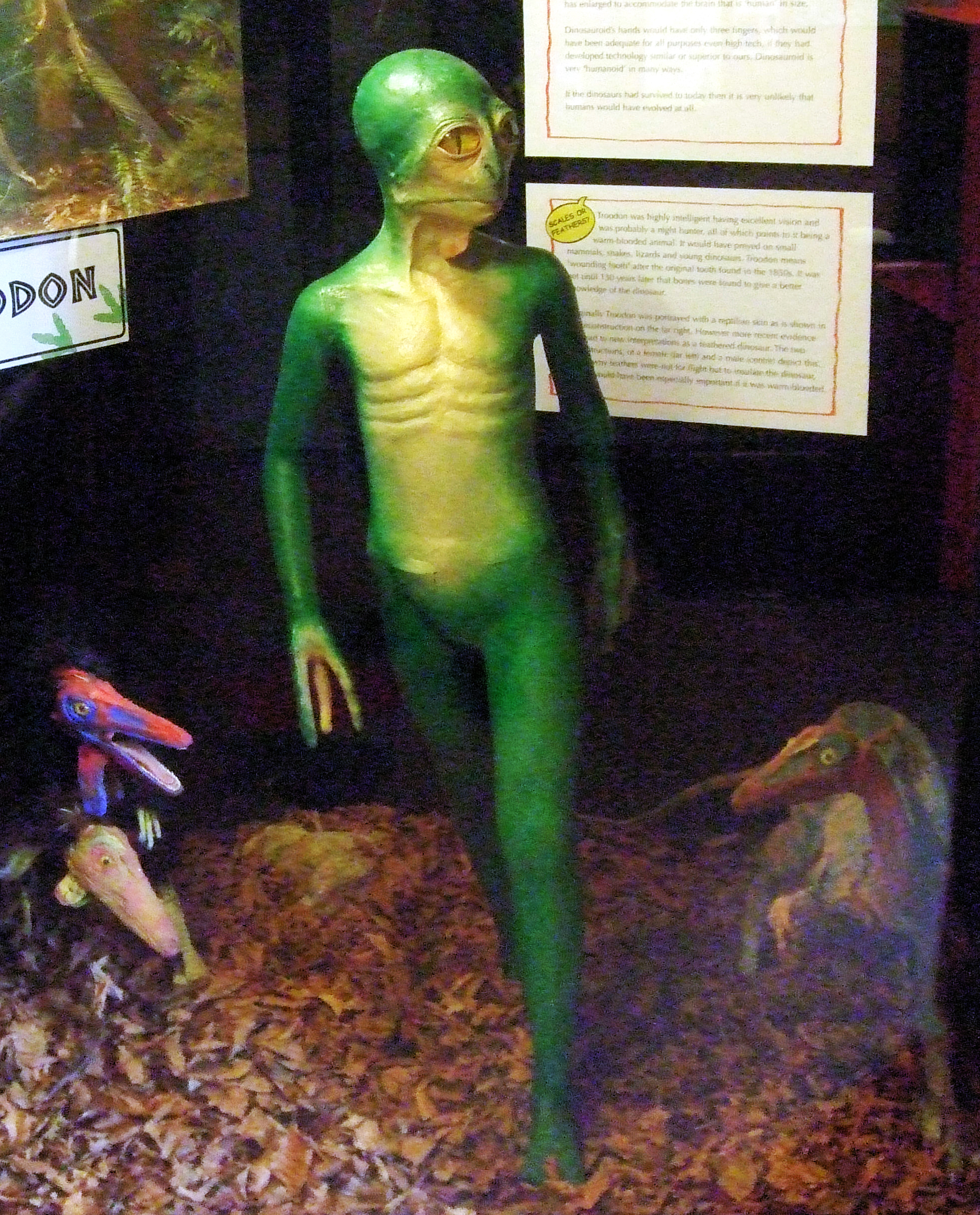
A model of the hypothetical dinosauroid, Dinosaur Museum, Dorchester

In 1982, Canadian paleontologist Dale Russell imagined the "dinosauroid" thought experiment, which speculated an evolutionary path for Stenonychosaurus if it had not gone extinct in the Cretaceous–Paleogene extinction event 66 million years ago, and had instead evolved into an intelligent being. Russell commissioned a model of his dinosauroid by artist Ron Séguin, and the concept became popular. Various later anthropologists have continued Russell's speculations about intelligent Troodon-like dinosaurs, though they often find his original idea too anthropomorphic.

== Popular science, mass media and cultural impacts ==
Published in April 1975 in the magazine Scientific American, Bob Bakker's article "Dinosaur Renaissance" both coined this new era in dinosaur research and started popularising the new views on dinosaurs. These latter early spread out of the United States. As an example, the same year as Bakker's article, the British science populariser Adrian Desmond published in England his book The Hot-Blooded Dinosaurs: A Revolution in Palaeontology, although the book raised some criticism, allegedly because of its lack of scientific tone.

On television in 1976, Nova episode "The Hot-Blooded Dinosaurs" (aired on WGBH Boston) retook the title of previous year Desmond's book and showed Robert T. Bakker in his earliest known mass media appearance, alongside other fellow dinosaur specialists such as Dale Russell, Robert McNeill Alexander, John Ostrom, Philip Regal, Armand de Ricqlès and others.

As of 1983, Montanan artist Doug Henderson started painting anatomically modern-view life restorations of Maiasaura for a children's book authored by Jack Horner, James Gorman and Jeri D. Walton. Finally published in 1985 the book was titled Maia: A Dinosaur Grows Up and, via its illustrations, showed to the public Maiasaura and other of its contemporary dinosaurs on horizontal-backbone posture, contrary to the till-then traditional, popular and incorrect posture seen in dinosaurs (bipedal or not) that permanently were dragging their tails on the ground.

In 1985 as well, the CBS television documentary Dinosaur! presented to the audiences the new views on dinosaur research through before-the-camera interventions of Bakker and Russell, but also Philip J. Currie and Jack Horner. In January 4, 1989, the same group of paleontologists reappeared in another programme, "The Great Dinosaur Hunt", part of The Infinite Voyage series of documentaries. Both documentaries, Dinosaur! (1985) and "The Great Dinosaur Hunt" (1989) contributed to popularise the new understanding of dinosaur features such as endothermia, fast locomotion, a higher intelligence, bird affiliation to dinosaurs and the hypothesis of a meteor impact causing the Cretaceous–Paleogene extinction event.

In 1991 two short documentaries produced by Earthtalk Studios: A Giant Leap for Dinosaurs and Dinosaur Hunters, both directed by Daniel J. Smith, showed Jack Horner at Camp Makela (the scientists' camp that is on site at "Egg Mountain") talking with children and adolescents about dinosaur nesting behaviour and the cutting edge of dinosaur research.

Robert Bakker's non-technical articles and books, particularly The Dinosaur Heresies (1986), have contributed significantly to the popularization of dinosaur science.

The 1993 film version of Jurassic Park was perhaps the most significant event in raising public awareness of dinosaur renaissance theories. For the first time in a major film, dinosaurs were portrayed as intelligent, agile, warm-blooded animals, rather than lumbering monsters more common to older films. Jack Horner was a consultant, and the artwork of Gregory Paul, Mark Hallett, Doug Henderson, and John Gurche was used in pre-production. While the dinosaurs eventually shown in the films had various anatomical inaccuracies, all four of these artists are in the on-screen credits as "Dinosaur Specialists". Bakker himself was not consulted or credited, but his research is referenced by one of the characters in the film, and a Bakker look-alike appears in the sequel The Lost World by the name of Robert Burke.

== See also ==
- Paleoart and Paleoartists
