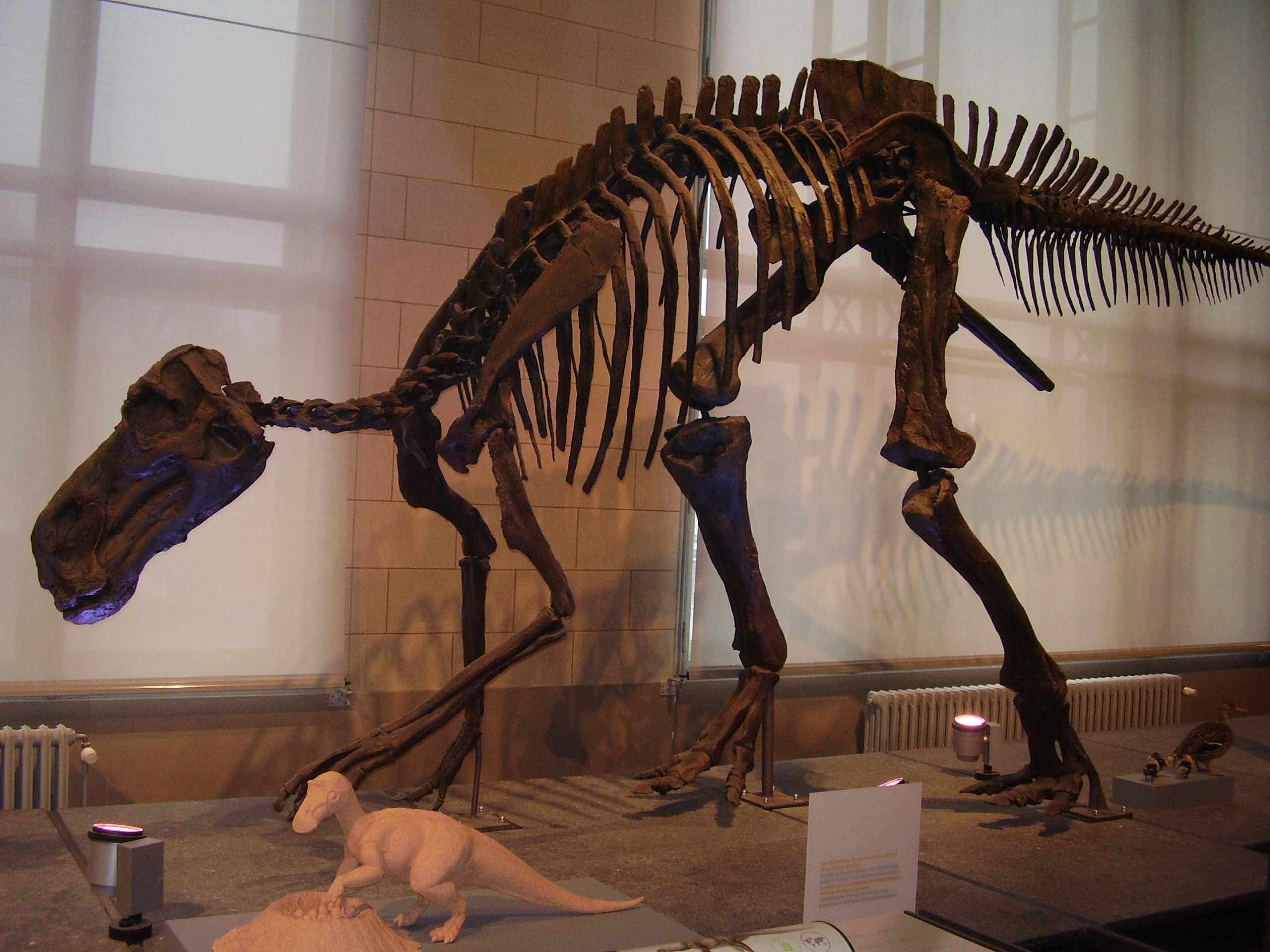
- Mounted cast, Brussels Natural History Museum

Scientific classification
- Kingdom: Animalia
- Phylum: Chordata
- Class: Reptilia
- Clade: Dinosauria
- Clade: †Ornithischia
- Clade: †Ornithopoda
- Family: †Hadrosauridae
- Subfamily: †Saurolophinae
- Tribe: †Brachylophosaurini
- Genus: †Maiasaura; Horner & Makela, 1979

Type species
- †Maiasaura peeblesorum Horner & Makela, 1979

= Maiasaura =

Maiasaura Temporal range: Late Cretaceous (Santonian – Campanian), 86.3–70.6 Ma

Extinct genus of reptiles

Maiasaura (from Greek: μαῖα, (Note: Μαῖα term also related to Maia, one of the seven sisters (Pleiades) and the mother of Hermes by Zeus in Greek mythology.) lit. 'good mother' and Greek: σαύρα, the feminine form of saurus, lit. 'lizard') is a large herbivorous saurolophine hadrosaurid ("duck-billed") dinosaur genus that lived in the area currently covered by the state of Montana and the Canadian province of Alberta, in the Upper Cretaceous (mid to late Campanian), from 86.3 to 70.6 million years ago.

Discovered in 1978 during the dinosaur renaissance, the species description of Maiasaura first came in 1979 from paleontologists Jack Horner and Bob Makela following the discovery of a site located South of Choteau, Montana. They named the new genus and species Maiasaura peeblesorum, with the genus name Maiasaura, ("good mother lizard") referring to Makela and Horner's conclusion that this species took care of their offspring. Collected data at the site indicated that Maiasaura fed its young while they were in the nest, the first instance of parental and social behavior in dinosaurs. This was in contradiction with the common idea of the 1970s that dinosaurs laid eggs and abandoned them immediately afterwards, providing no parental care. In 1979, one year after the discovery of the nests and juveniles, Maiasaura whole eggs were unearthed, the first discovery of dinosaur whole eggs both on the American continent and in the Western Hemisphere. Further work in the area led to the discovery of more dinosaur eggs, leading to the area being named "Egg Mountain". Computed tomography scans showed embryos at a very early stage of development inside some of the eggs.

Because of these elements, Maiasaura is considered one of the most significant discoveries in the history of dinosaur research.

Maiasaura, whose bones have been found by hundreds in the state of Montana, has been chosen as Montana's state fossil.

== Discovery ==
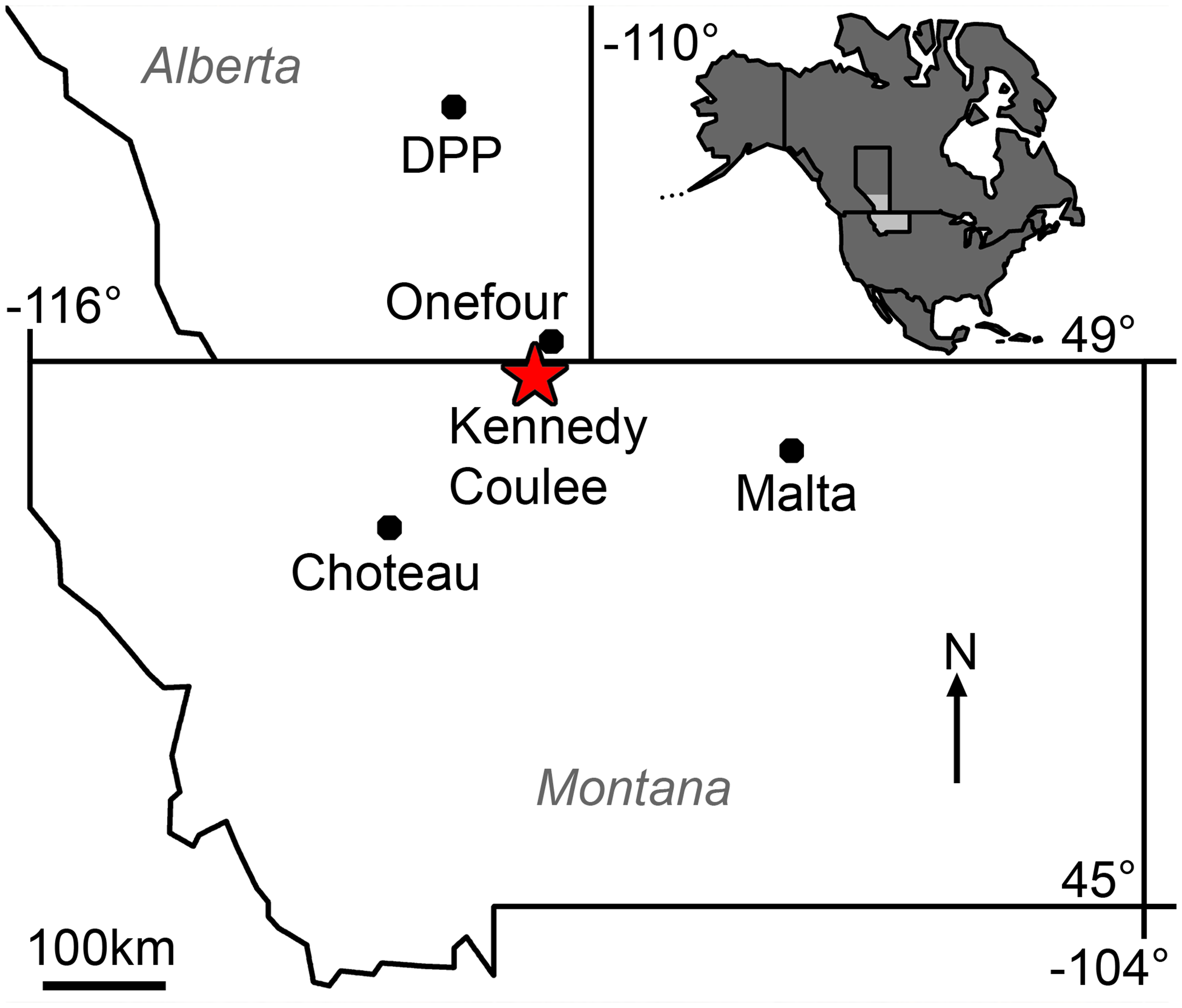
Map of Brachylophosaurini (Saurolophinae) specimen discoveries in Alberta and Montana. The first remains of Maiasaura have been found south of Choteau, visible on the map.

Remains of Maiasaura were first discovered in Bynum, Montana by Marion Brandvold, the owner of a local rock shop, and her husband John. In 1978, paleontologist Bob Makela had been told by fellow Berkeley paleontologist Bill Clemens that Brantvold was looking for help identifying the fossils. Makela and his research partner Jack Horner then visited the rock shop, where Horner identified the fossils as those of hatchling hadrosaurs. Brantvold then took the paleontologists to her house, where she had been keeping the remains of at least four more individuals in a coffee can. Two weeks later she took them to the site in Choteau where she have found the remains, where bones were visible on the surface. Makela and Horner excavated the spot and noticed that they were excavating a nest, where they found fifteen hatchlings. Subsequently the site delivered more nests and juveniles, all belonging to an unknown species of hadrosaur. During the second summer dig in 1979, student Fran Tannenbaum discovered the first whole dinosaur egg ever found in North America.

A skull of Maiasaura, specimen PU 22405 (now in the collections of the Yale Peabody Museum of Natural History as YPM PU 22405), was discovered by Laurie Trexler in 1979. Trexler partially broke the skull as a consequence of her lack of appropriate excavating tools, but after informing Jack Horner and Robert Makela, the remaining portion was properly excavated. Later that year it was established as the holotype of the new species, which they described and named as Maiasaura peeblesorum. The generic name Maiasaura means 'good mother lizard' and the specific name, peeblesorum, honours the families of John and James Peebles, on whose land the finds were made. The announcement of the discovery of Maiasaura attracted renewed scientific interest to the Two Medicine Formation and many other new kinds of dinosaurs were discovered as a result of the increased attention.

With time more eggs were discovered and the site of this discovery earned the name of "Egg Mountain", after the abundance of hadrosaur eggs and eggshell pieces found there. Over 200 specimens, in all age ranges, have been found. The sites that close to Choteau contain Maiasaura remains of adults, juveniles, nests and eggs, have been preserved in the rock as if a rapid event had "frozen" the area. It is assumed that such event was the eruption of a volcano located among the nearby Elkhorn mountains. Nests, eggs and animals were covered by ash and once they fossilised they remained almost perfectly preserved until they were discovered in 1978. In 1985 The Nature Conservancy purchased the site of Egg Mountain from the Peebles family, the original owners, leasing the property to the Peebles for cattle grazing and allowing curator Jack Horner and the Museum of the Rockies to run a paleontology field camp. In 2004, the Museum of the Rockies purchased the property and named Egg Mountain "Museum of the Rockies' Beatrice R. Taylor Paleontology Research Site", honouring Beatrice Taylor, whose family donated the money for the purchase.

David Trexler, son of Brandvold and her first husband Clifford Trexler, went on to become a paleontologist himself. In 1995 he founded the Montana Dinosaur Center in Bynum. From 1998 to 2004 Brandvold led a legal fight with the Yale and Princeton universities to recover the original Maiasaura babies she found in the 1970s. In 2004, she won and the fossils are held at the Montana Dinosaur Center.

== Description ==
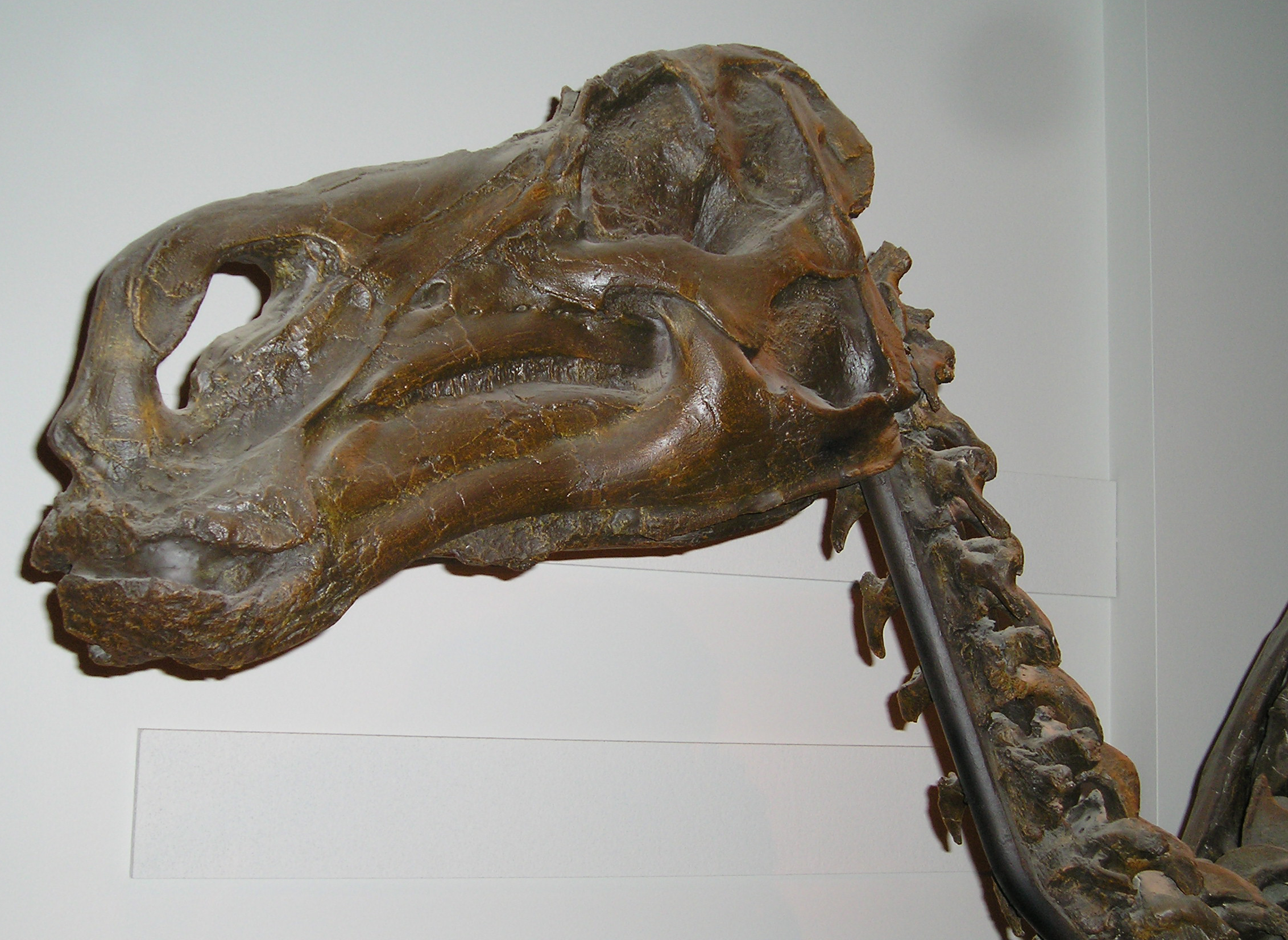
Skull cast, Royal Ontario Museum

Size comparison with human

Maiasaura peeblesorum were large, attaining a maximum known length of about 9 metres (30 ft) and an approximate body mass measured at up to 4 metric tons (4.4 short tons). They had a large "duck-billed" mouth structure and rows of hundreds of teeth, typical of hadrosaurids. While hadrosaurids have very similar post-cranial body plans, the distinguishing characteristic of Maiasaura peeblesorum is a prominent short, solid crest-like structure situated between the eyes. This crest may have been used in headbutting contests between males during the breeding season.

Maiasaura were herbivorous, terrestrial dinosaurs. They were capable of walking both on two (bipedal) or four (quadrupedal) legs. Studies of the stress patterns of healed bones show that juveniles under four years old walked mainly bipedally, switching to a mainly quadrupedal style of walking when they grew larger. Maiasaura, like most other hadrosaurs, possessed little in the way of obvious weaponry, though likely could defend themselves with kicks, stomps, or their muscular tails. It is likely that they primarily resorted to fleeing in the face of danger, using the vast sizes of their herds to be less likely to be targeted. Mass bone beds discovered in the Two Medicine Formation show that herds could be extremely large and comprise as many as 10,000 individuals. Hundreds of specimens have been found throughout all stages of life, allowing for M. peeblesorum to be used for understanding how hadrosaurids grew.

== Classification ==
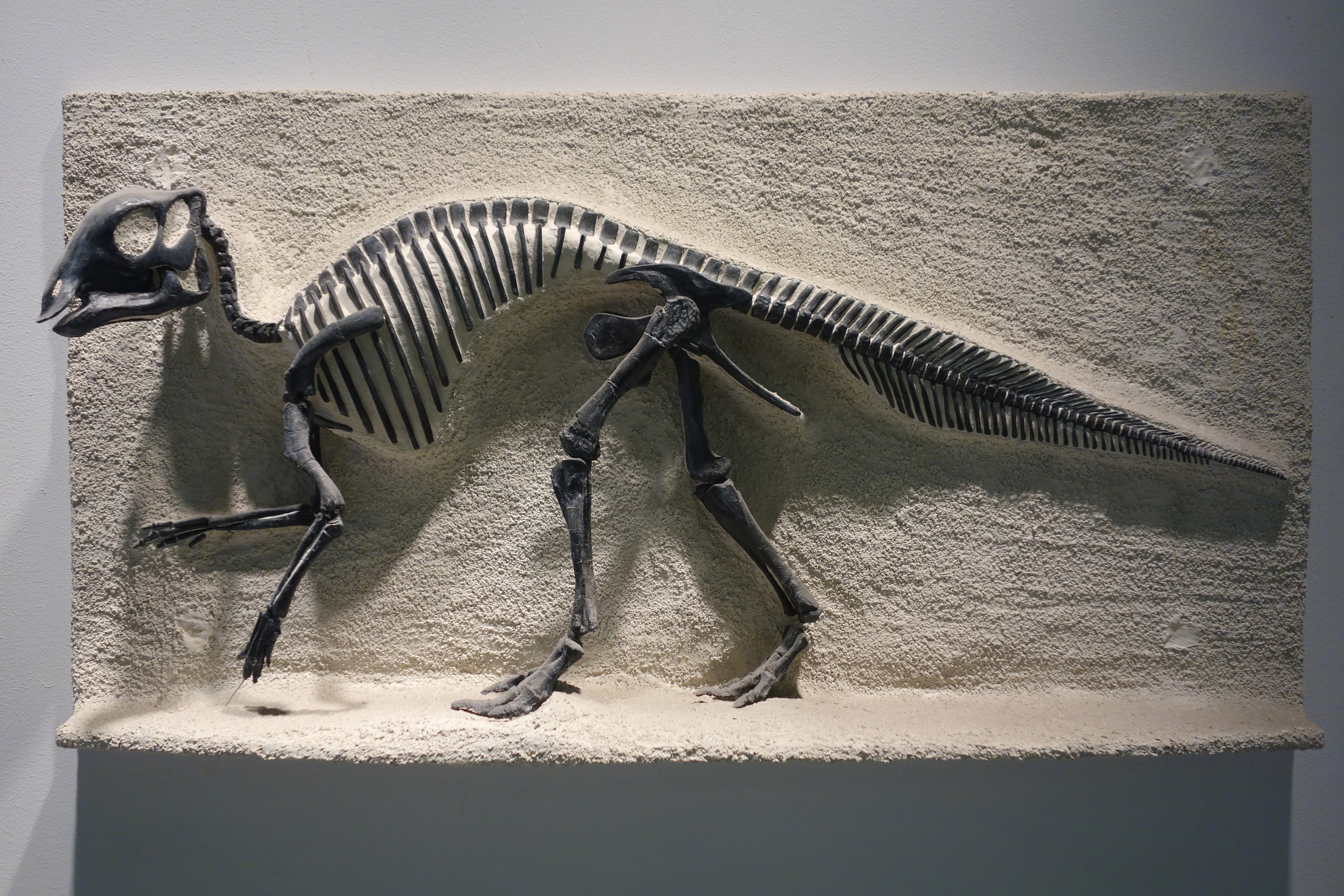
Cast of a juvenile skeleton

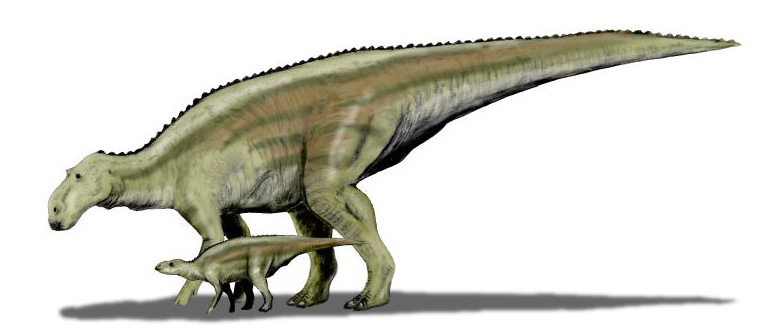
Life restorations of an adult and juvenile

Maiasaura peeblesorum is in the tribe Brachylophosaurini along with these related taxa:

- Acristavus gagslarsoni
- Brachylophosaurus canadensis
- Ornatops incantatus
- Probrachylophosaurus bergei

The following cladogram of hadrosaurid relationships was published in 2013 by Albert Prieto-Márquez et al.:

- Saurolophinae
  - Brachylophosaurini
    - Acristavus gagslarsoni
    - - Brachylophosaurus canadensis
      - Maiasaura peeblesorum
  - - Shantungosaurus giganteus
    - - Edmontosaurus
        - Edmontosaurus regalis
        - Edmontosaurus annectens
      - - Saurolophini
          - Kerberosaurus manakini
          - - Sabinas OTU
            - - Prosaurolophus maximus
              - Saurolophus
                - Saurolophus morrisi
                - - Saurolophus osborni
                  - Saurolophus angustirostris
        - Kritosaurini
          - Wulagasaurus dongi
          - - Kritosaurus navajovius
            - - - "Aquilarhinus"
                - - Secernosaurus koerneri
                  - Willinakaqe salitralensis
              - Gryposaurus
                - Gryposaurus latidens
                - - Gryposaurus notabilis
                  - Gryposaurus monumentensis

== Paleobiology ==
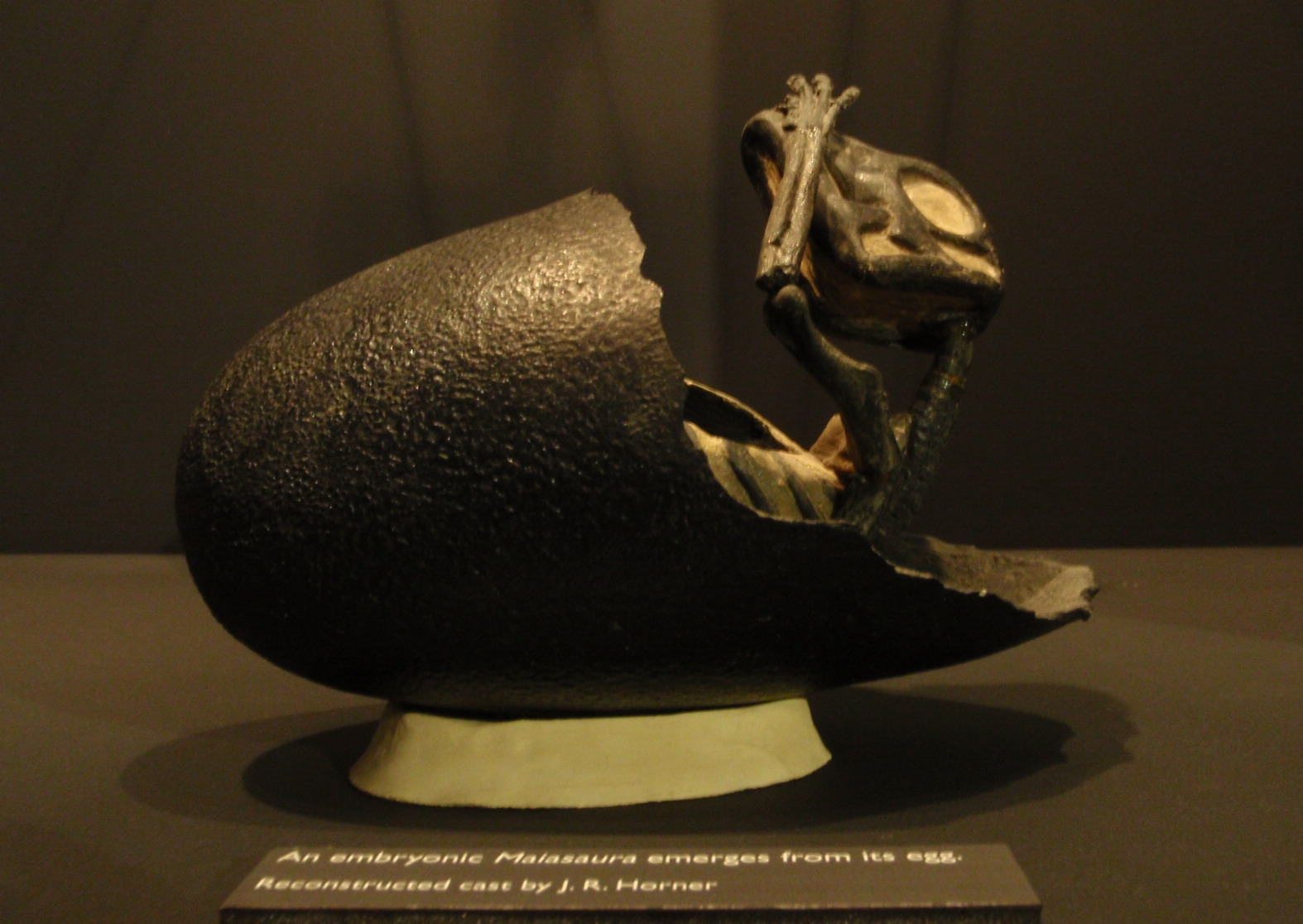
Reconstructed cast by Jack Horner of a Maiasaura emerging from its egg

Maiasaura lived in herds and it raised its young in nesting colonies. The nests in the colonies were packed closely together, like those of modern seabirds, with the gap between the nests being around 7 metres (23 ft); less than the length of the adult animal. The nests were made of earth and contained 30 to 40 eggs laid in a circular or spiral pattern. The eggs were about the size of ostrich eggs and are oval shaped with one slightly more pointed end. Fossilized M. peeblesorum eggs are black in color and have high, prominent ridges on the outer surface.

The eggs were incubated by the heat resulting from rotting vegetation placed into the nest by the parents, rather than a parent sitting on the nest. Upon hatching, fossils of baby Maiasaura show that their legs were not fully developed and thus they were incapable of walking. Fossils also show that their teeth were partly worn, which means that the adults brought food to the nest.

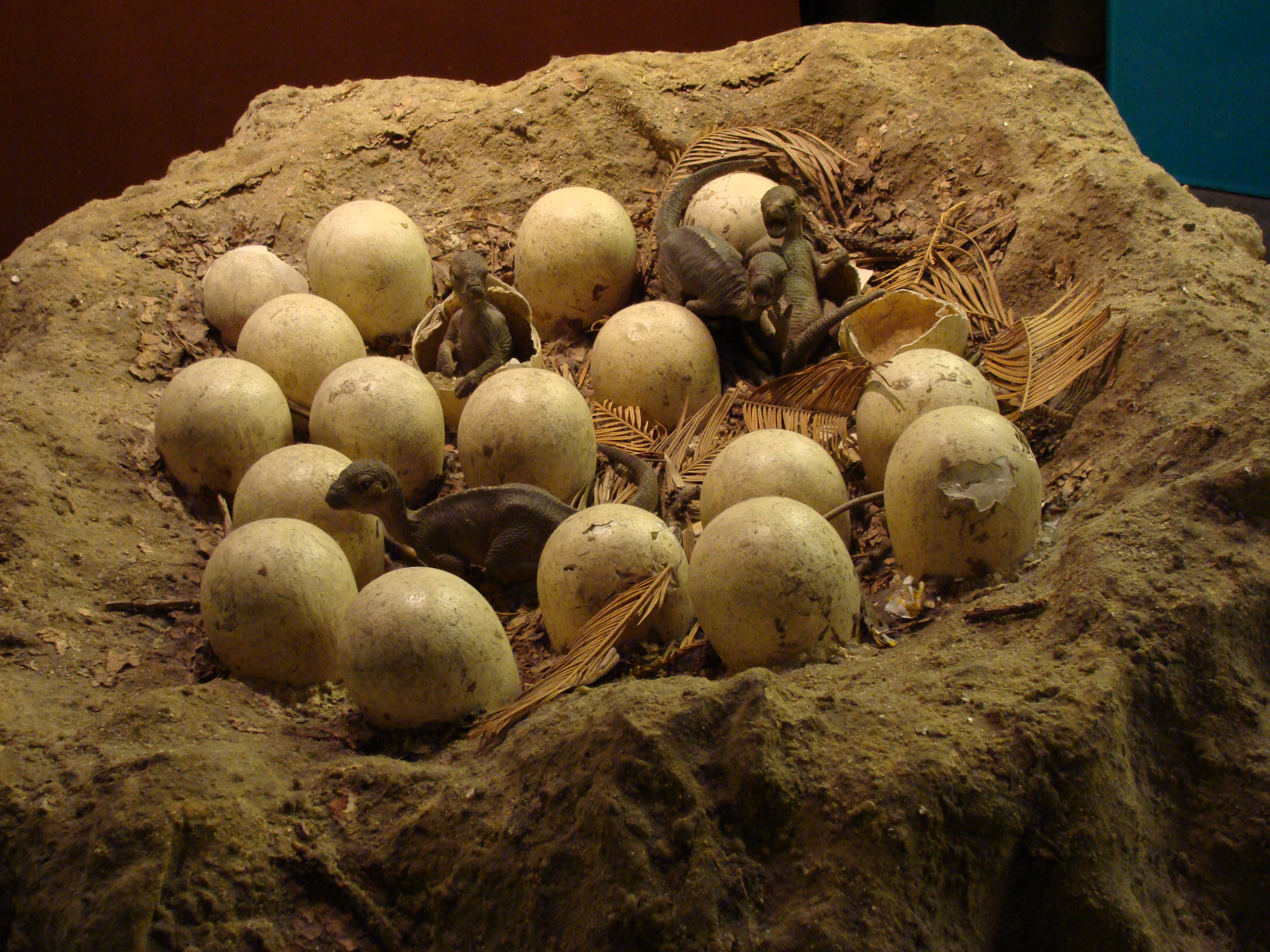
Reconstruction of a nest with eggs

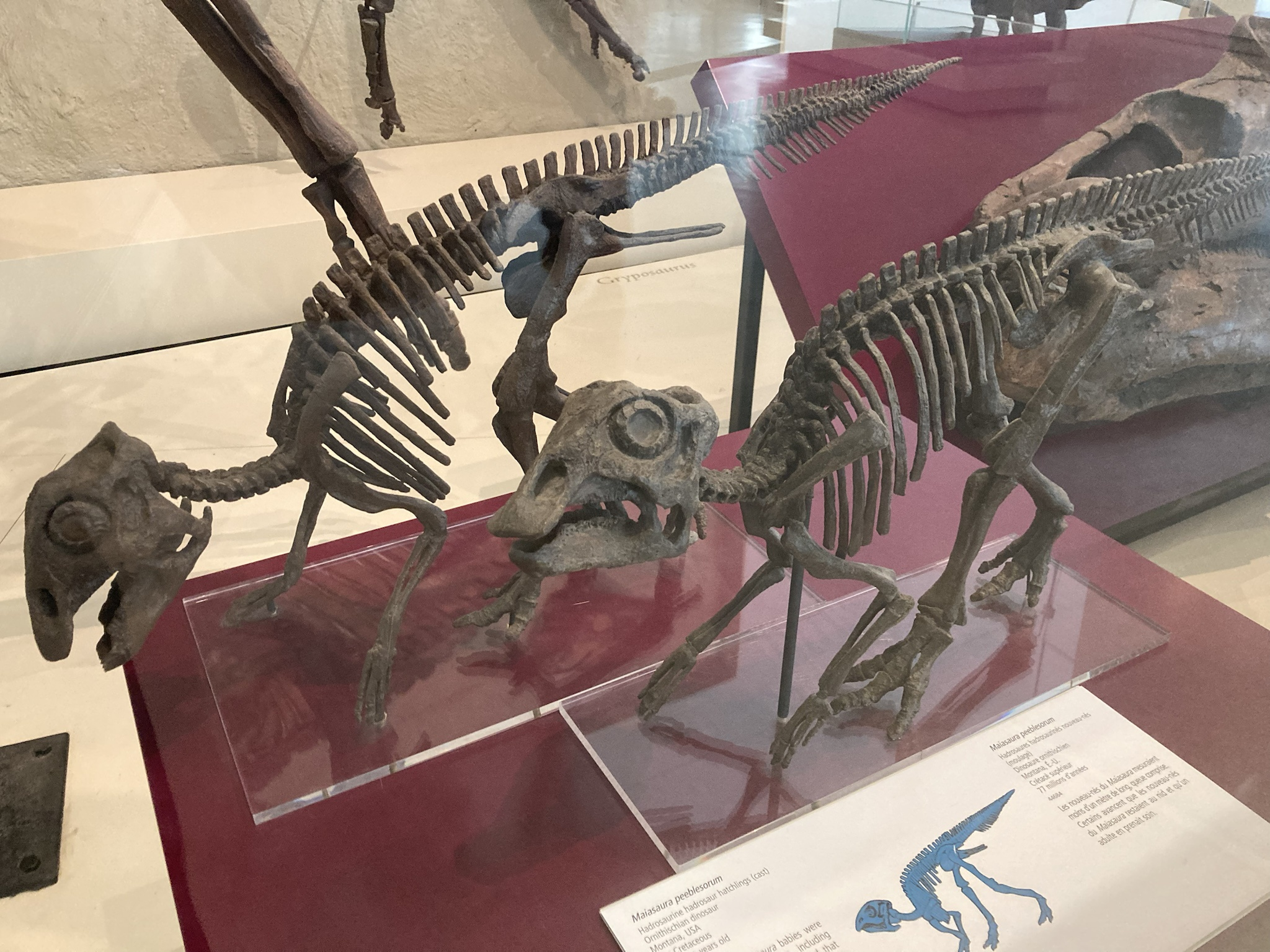
Baby Maiasaura casts on display at Royal Ontario Museum

The hatchlings grew from a size of 41 to 147 centimetres (16 to 58 in) long in the span of their first year. At this point, or perhaps after another year, the animal left the nest. This high rate of growth may be evidence of warm bloodedness. The hatchlings had different facial proportions from the adults, with larger eyes and a shorter snout. These features are associated with cuteness, and commonly elicit care from parents in animals dependent on their parents for survival during the early stages of life. Based on metabolic growth rates and age estimations of juvenile specimens both in and outside the nests, it is suggested that infant Maiasaura were altricial and left the confines of their nests after 40-75 days (or roughly a little over 1-2 months old). These studies also were compared to the related lambeosaurine hadrosaur Hypacrosaurus, for which neonates are also known. These analyses suggest Hypacrosaurus was more precocial than Maiasaura, based on its ecological traits.

Studies led by Holly Woodward, Jack Horner, Freedman Fowler et al. have given insight into the life history of Maiasaura, resulting in what is perhaps the most detailed life history of any dinosaur known, and to which all others can be compared. From a sample of fifty individual Maiasaura tibiae, it was found that Maiasaurs had a mortality rate of about 89.9% in their first year of life. If the animals survived their second year, their mortality rate would drop to 12.7%. The animals would spend their next six years maturing and growing. Sexual maturity was found to occur in their third year, while skeletal maturity was attained at eight years of age. In their eighth year and beyond, the mortality rate for Maiasaura would spike back to around 44.4%. The studies that followed also found that Maiasaurs were primarily bipedal as juveniles, and switched to a more quadrupedal stance as they aged. It was also found that Maiasaura also included rotting wood in its diet, as well that its environment had a long, dry season prone to drought. The results of the study were published in the journal Palaeobiology on September 3, 2015.

=== Diet ===
A paper from 2007 showed that Maiasaura had a diet consisting of fibrous plants, wood, rotting wood, tree bark, leaves, branches, ferns, angiosperms and possibly grasses. This would imply that Maiasaura was both a browser and a grazer. Analysis of its dental wear patterns show that juvenile M. peeblesorum exhibited more crush wear than adults, which displayed more shear wear than juveniles. This suggests that adults fed more on tough, fibrous vegetation while juveniles fed more on hard, brittle objects like nuts, seeds, or berries.

=== Sexual dimorphism ===
Studies of Maiasaura by Saitta et al., suggest that one sex was roughly 45% larger than the other according to the mathematical analysis known as size statistics. However, it cannot be ascertained at this time whether the larger sex was male or female.

== Palaeoecology ==
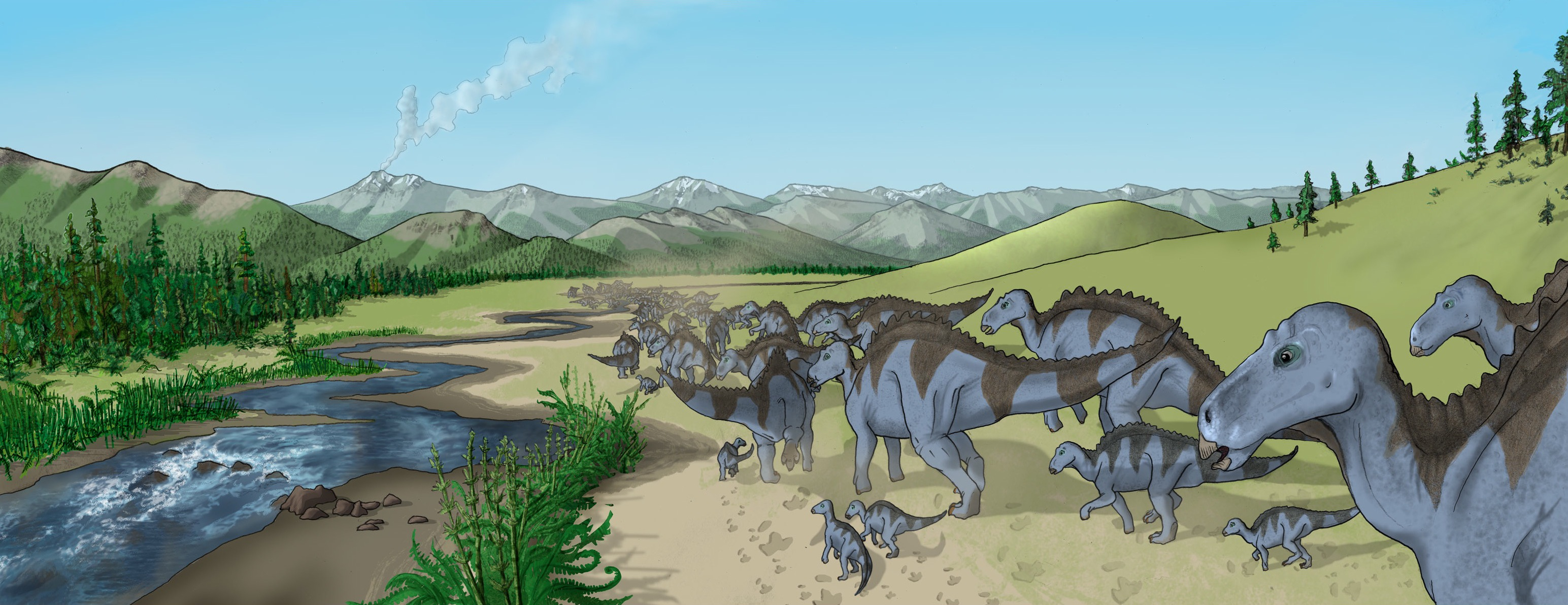
Illustration of a herd of Maiasaura walking along a creekbed, as found in the semi-arid Two Medicine Formation fossil bed. This region was characterized by volcanic ash layers and conifer, fern and horsetail vegetation.

Maiasaura is a characteristic fossil of the middle portion (lithofacies 4) of the Two Medicine Formation, dated from about 86.3 to 70.6 million years ago. Maiasaura lived alongside the troodontids Stenonychosaurus and Troodon and the basal ornithopod Orodromeus, as well as the dromaeosaurid Bambiraptor and the tyrannosaur Daspletosaurus. Another species of hadrosaurids, referable to the genus Hypacrosaurus, coexisted with Maiasaura for some time, as Hypacrosaurus remains have been found lower in the Two Medicine Formation than was earlier known. The discovery of an additional hadrosaurid, Gryposaurus latidens, in the same range as Maiasaura has shown that the border between hypothesized distinct faunas in the upper and middle is less distinct than once thought. There seems to be a major diversification in ornithischian taxa after the appearance of Maiasaura within the Two Medicine Formation. The thorough examination of strata found along the Two Medicine River (which exposes the entire upper half of the Two Medicine Formation) indicates that the apparent diversification was a real event rather than a result of preservational biases. While Maiasaura has historically been associated with the Two Medicine formation ceratopsid Einiosaurus in a single fauna, this is inaccurate, as Maiasaura is known exclusively from older strata.

In the Oldman Formation of Alberta, Maiasaura lived alongside the ceratopsians Albertaceratops, Anchiceratops, Chasmosaurus, Coronosaurus, and Wendiceratops, as well as the dromaeosaurids Dromaeosaurus, Saurornitholestes, and Hesperonychus, the tyrannosaurid Daspletosaurus, the orodromine thescelosaurid Albertadromeus, the pachycephalosaurs Foraminacephale and Hanssuesia, the ornithomimid Struthiomimus, the other hadrosaurids Brachylophosaurus, Corythosaurus, and Parasaurolophus, and the ankylosaurid Scolosaurus.

== Maiasaura and the popularisation of the "dinosaur renaissance" ==
Within the first years of the discovery of Maiasaura, the importance of such a remarkable find had a durable impact on the public and media contributed to that:

As of 1983, dinosaur renaissance artist Doug Henderson started painting anatomically modern-view life restorations of Maiasaura for a children's book authored by Jack Horner, James Gorman and Jeri D. Walton. Finally published in 1985 the book was titled Maia: A Dinosaur Grows Up and, via its illustrations, showed to the public Maiasaura and other of its contemporary dinosaurs on horizontal-backbone posture, contrary to the till-then traditional, popular and incorrect posture seen in dinosaurs (bipedal or not) that permanently were dragging their tails on the ground.

In 1985 as well, the CBS television documentary Dinosaur! showed Jack Horner talking to the camera about the "Egg Mountain" site and its related discoveries. Dinosaur! was seminal too showing to the CBS audiences the CT scan image of a Maiasaura embryo found inside an egg that had been previously collected at "Egg Mountain".

In 1987, the television documentary film Digging Dinosaurs, produced by the television channel WHYY Philadelphia with fund by the William Penn Foundation, showed a fossil dig team led by Bob Makela and Jack Horner, all excavating at a Maiasaura fossilised nesting ground in northern Montana. In the film, Horner talks to the camera about his conclusions on how the juveniles hatched and grew, first in the nests, then in company of the adults when joining the herd. He also mentions his interest in the opportunity that this species, found in hundreds of individuals, brings to studies on individual variation within a species of dinosaur.

Horner reappeared on television, this time with extended screen time about the Maiasaura discoveries, in another programme, "The Great Dinosaur Hunt", part of The Infinite Voyage series of documentaries. The Great Dinosaur Hunt first aired on January 4, 1989.

In 1991 two short documentaries produced by Earthtalk Studios: A Giant Leap for Dinosaurs and Dinosaur Hunters, both directed by Daniel J. Smith, showed Jack Horner at Camp Makela (the scientists' camp that is on site at "Egg Mountain") talking with children and adolescents about the cutting edge of dinosaur research.

== See also ==
- Timeline of hadrosaur research

== Bibliography ==
- Dodson, Peter & Britt, Brooks & Carpenter, Kenneth & Forster, Catherine A. & Gillette, David D. & Norell, Mark A. & Olshevsky, George & Parrish, J. Michael & Weishampel, David B. The Age of Dinosaurs. Publications International, LTD. p. 116-117. ISBN 0-7853-0443-6.
- Horner, Jack and Gorman, James. (1988). Digging Dinosaurs: The Search that Unraveled the Mystery of Baby Dinosaurs, Workman Publishing Co.
- Lehman, T. M., 2001, Late Cretaceous dinosaur provinciality: In: Mesozoic Vertebrate Life, edited by Tanke, D. H., and Carpenter, K., Indiana University Press, pp. 310–328.
- Palmer, D., ed. (1999). The Marshall Illustrated Encyclopedia of Dinosaurs and Prehistoric Animals. London: Marshall Editions. p. 148. ISBN 1-84028-152-9.
- Trexler, D., 2001, Two Medicine Formation, Montana: geology and fauna: In: Mesozoic Vertebrate Life, edited by Tanke, D. H., and Carpenter, K., Indiana University Press, pp. 298–309. ISBN 9780253339072
