= Time Machine (novel series) =

1980s children's novel series

Cover of the first book in the series, Secret of the Knights. Story by Jim Gasperini, illustrated by Richard Hescox; cover design and logo by Alex Jay.

Time Machine is a series of children's novels published in the United States by Bantam Books from 1984 to 1989, similar to their more successful Choose Your Own Adventure line of "interactive" novels. Each book was written in the second person, with the reader choosing how the story should progress. They were designed by Byron Preiss Visual Publications.

== Differences ==
The main difference between the Choose Your Own Adventure series and the Time Machine series was that Time Machine books featured only one ending, forcing the reader to try many different choices until they discovered it. Also, the series taught children basic history about many diverse subjects, from dinosaurs to World War II. Only the sixth book in the series, The Rings of Saturn, departed from actual history; it is set in the future, and features educational content about the Solar System. Some books gave the reader their choice from a small list of equipment at the beginning, and this choice would affect events later in the book (e.g. "If you brought the pen knife, turn to page 52, if not turn to page 45.").

Another main difference between the Time Machine novels and the Choose Your Own Adventure counterparts was hints offered at certain junctures, where the reader was advised to look at hints at the back of the book contained in a "Data File" section. An example was in Mission to World War II about the Warsaw Ghetto uprising, where the reader was given the choice of starting the mission in the Jewish ghetto or the Aryan part of Warsaw; the "Data File" hint for Page 3 asks "Was Ringelblum an Aryan or a Jew?" suggesting the reader should begin in the Jewish section of the city, but not ordering it, or it was possible for the hint to be missed.

The line spawned a brief spin-off series for younger readers, the Time Traveler novels.

== Books ==
Time Machine series
No.	Title	Date	Author	Illus.	ISBN	Summary
1	Secret of the Knights	1984	Jim Gasperini	Richard Hescox	0-553-23601-6	It is the year 1340. You have traveled back to the age of knights, and must discover the secret of the Order of the Garter.
2	Search for Dinosaurs	1984	David Bischoff	Doug Henderson Alex Niño Cover art by William Stout	0-553-23602-4	It is the year 1 million B.C. You have traveled back to the age of dinosaurs, and must photograph an Archaeopteryx.
3	Sword of the Samurai	1984	Michael Reaves Steve Perry	Steve Leialoha	0-553-24052-8	It is the year 1615. You have traveled back to the age of samurai, and must recover the sword of Miyamoto Musashi.
4	Sail with Pirates	1984	Jim Gasperini	John Pierard Alex Niño	0-553-23808-6	It is the year 1684. You have traveled back to the age of pirates, and must recover treasure from Our Lady of the Pure and Immaculate Conception.
5	Civil War Secret Agent	1984	Steve Perry	Alex Niño	0-553-24183-4	It is the year 1860. You have traveled back to America in the days before the Civil War, and must assist Harriet Tubman with the Underground Railroad.
6	The Rings of Saturn	1985	Arthur Byron Cover	Brian Humphrey Marc Hempel	0-553-24424-8	It is the year 2085. You have traveled forward to the age of interplanetary civilization, and must make first contact with an alien race.
7	Ice Age Explorer	1985	Dougal Dixon	Doug Henderson Alex Niño Cover art by William Stout	0-553-24722-0	It is the year 35000 B.C. You have traveled back to the age of prehistoric man, and must find the inspiration for a cave painting.
8	The Mystery of Atlantis	1985	Jim Gasperini	Kenneth Smith	0-553-25073-6	It is the year 400 B.C. You have traveled back to the first Olympics, and must find the basis for the lost city of Atlantis.
9	Wild West Rider	1985	Stephen Overholser	Steve Leialoha	0-553-25180-5	It is the year 1862. You have traveled back to the Wild West, and must learn why the Pony Express was so short-lived.
10	American Revolutionary	1985	Arthur Byron Cover	Walter Martishius Alex Niño	0-553-25300-X	It is the year 1774. You have traveled back to the American Revolution, and must identify who fired the first shot.
11	Mission to World War II	1986	Susan Nanus Marc Kornblatt	John Pierard	0-553-25431-6	It is the year 1940. You have traveled back to Europe during World War II, and must find historical records kept by Emanuel Ringelblum.
12	Search for the Nile	1986	Robert W. Walker	José Gonzalez Navaroo	0-553-25538-X	It is the year 1889. You have traveled back to the unexplored jungles of Africa, and must adventure with Henry M. Stanley to discover the source of the Nile River.
13	Secret of the Royal Treasure	1986	Carol Gaskin	Ernie Colón	0-553-25729-3	It is the year 1599. You have traveled back to England in the time of Queen Elizabeth I, and must find out what happened to her ring.
14	Blade of the Guillotine	1986	Arthur Byron Cover	Scott Hampton	0-553-26038-3	It is the year 1794. You have traveled back to France during the Reign of Terror, and must track down a diamond necklace.
15	Flame of the Inquisition	1986	Marc Kornblatt	John Pierard	0-553-26160-6	It is the year 1487. You have traveled back to Spain during the Inquisition, and must learn why Queen Isabella I of Castile allowed it to happen.
16	Quest for the Cities of Gold	1987	Richard Glatzer	José Gonzalez Navaroo	0-553-26295-5	It is the year 1513. You have traveled back to America during the Age of Spanish Exploration, and must discover the truth about the Seven Cities of Gold.
17	Scotland Yard Detective	1987	Seymour V. Reit	Charles Vess	0-553-26421-4	It is the year 1905. You have traveled back to turn-of-the-century London, and must assist Scotland Yard rescue a captive prince.
18	Sword of Caesar	1987	Robin Stevenson Bruce Stevenson	Richard Hescox	0-553-26531-8	It is the year 44 B.C. You have traveled back to Rome in the time of Julius Caesar, and must learn what happened to his battle sword.
19	Death Mask of Pancho Villa	1987	Carol Gaskin George Guthridge	Kenneth Huey	0-553-26674-8	It is the year 1915. You have traveled back to Mexico during the revolution, and must find the death mask of Pancho Villa.
20	Bound for Australia	1987	Nancy Bailey	Julek Heller	0-553-26793-0	It is the year 1787. You have traveled back to the time when Australia was a prison colony for English criminals, and must identify the first successful settler there.
21	Caravan to China	1987	Carol Gaskin	José Gonzalez Navaroo	0-553-26906-2	It is the year 1272. You have traveled back to the empire of Kublai Khan, and must follow the route of Marco Polo.
22	Last of the Dinosaurs	1988	Peter Lerangis	Doug Henderson Cover art by Mark Hallett	0-553-27007-9	It is the year 50 million B.C. You have traveled back to a time when dinosaurs rule the earth, and must witness the Great Extinction.
23	Quest for King Arthur	1988	Ruth Ashby	Scott Caple	0-553-27126-1	It is the year 490. You have traveled back to Britain during the Dark Ages, and must find the truth behind the legends of King Arthur.
24	World War I Flying Ace	1988	Richard Mueller	George Pratt	0-553-27231-4	It is the year 1917. You have traveled back to Germany during World War I, and must discover who shot down Manfred von Richthofen.
25	World War II Code Breaker	1989	Peter Lerangis	Alex Niño	0-553-28157-7	It is the year 1941. You have traveled back to World War II, and must investigate the use of code breaking in both the Pacific and European theatres of war.

=== Time Traveler (spinoff) ===
Time Traveler series
No.	Title	Date	Author	Illus.	ISBN	Summary
1	Voyage with Columbus	1986	Seymour V. Reit	José Gonzalez Navaroo	0-553-15431-1	In 1492, you will solve the mystery of Christopher Columbus's missing ship, the Santa María.
2	The Legend of Hiawatha	1986	Carol Gaskin	José Ortiz	0-553-15450-8	In the 1500s, you will meet Hiawatha and witness him bringing peace to form the Iroquois Five Nations.
3	The First Settlers	1987	Carol Gaskin	John Pierard Alex Niño	0-553-15483-4	In 1620, you will meet the Pilgrims and take part in the First Thanksgiving.
4	The Amazing Ben Franklin	1987	Peter Lerangis	José Ortiz	0-553-15504-0	In the 1700s, you will meet Ben Franklin and witness his apocryphal key and kite lightning experiment.
5	Paul Revere and the Boston Tea Party	1987	Marc Kornblatt	Ernie Colón	0-553-15529-6	In 1773, you will meet Paul Revere and participate in the Boston Tea Party.
6	George Washington and the Constitution	1987	Ellen Frankel Robin Stevenson	Frédéric Lère Alex Niño	0-553-15543-1	In the 1780s, you will meet George Washington and witness the Constitutional Convention.

== Reception ==
W. Peter Miller reviewed the Time Machine series for Different Worlds magazine and stated that "All in all these book adventures do exactly what they set out to do. They entertain while teaching you a little bit of history (in a painless way) and they work your brain, I enjoy this series a great deal. The physical production and graphics are first rate. There is not a lot of replay, but it usually takes over an hour to finish a book."

== See also ==
- Gamebook
