= John Sibbick =

British palaeoartist and illustrator

- Cover of the 1st edition of Warhammer Fantasy Roleplay, 1986
- Education: Guildford School of Art
- Known for: Palaeoart; Fantasy art
- Website: www.johnsibbick.com

John Sibbick (UK, 1949) is a British freelance illustrator and palaeoartist, known for his depictions of prehistoric life and for his fantasy art.

== Early life ==
John Sibbick began drawing in his childhood. His earliest art involved drawing figures and copying cartoons. Sibbick practiced drawing in a sketch club at his school and at age 11 he entered for the exams of the Royal Drawing Society, passing with honours. Sibbick began taking weekend classes at the Guildford School of Art at the age of 15. The next year, he began a full-time education in graphics and illustration at the school, lasting four years.

Sibbick was from an early age interested in fossils, natural history and astronomy. As a palaeoartist, his influences have included Zdeněk Burian, Rudolph Zallinger, Doug Henderson, Mauricio Antón, and Peter Trusler.

== Career ==
After finishing his studies, Sibbick spent four years at various design studios in London before he in 1972 went on to become a freelance illustrator. He initially worked as a general illustrator without any plans to specialize in any particular direction. The earliest books illustrated by Sibbick were largely children's reference books on a variety of subjects, sometimes including extinct life. Both his palaeoart and fantasy art careers began in the 1980s. He first gained wide recognition when his artwork was commissioned for a series of illustrated 1980s books on mythology and folk tales.

Sibbick's entry into professional palaeoart came when he in the early 1980s was commissioned to produce artwork for palaeontology books written by David Norman. Sibbick's 1980s and early 1990s palaeoart made him famous for his reconstructions of prehistoric life, particularly since they were published in accessible and popular books, one of the most notable of which were Norman's The Illustrated Encyclopedia of Dinosaurs (1985).

Sibbick has since the 1980s continued to produce both palaeoart and fantasy art, though he is probably best known for his depictions of dinosaurs. In terms of palaeoart, Sibbick has produced artwork for popular books, academic works, magazines such as National Geographic and GEO, museums, and exhibitions. He has also made concept drawings for television shows and films featuring prehistoric animals. In 2013, a series of dinosaur stamps were issued by the Royal Mail, featuring illustrations by Sibbick. In terms of fantasy art, some of Sibbick's most well-known work comes from his association with Games Workshop in the late 1980s. Sibbick painted the cover art for the first edition of the Warhammer Fantasy Roleplay rules, and for numerous later releases. His artwork was also used as cover images for the magazine White Dwarf. Sibbick's Warhammer artwork was highlighted in an Illuminations exposè in White Dwarf 83 in 1986.

Sibbick's colour work is executed in gouache on artist's board, and often benefits from the production of detailed preparatory sketches and even 3D models for reference. When commissioned for artwork on a prehistoric animal, Sibbick begins with examining the fossil evidence and consulting specialists, whereafter he produces sketches of anatomy, surface detail and behavior before working on the actual painting. Sibbick's 1980s and early 1990s work was in terms of anatomy influenced by interpretations of earlier artists, such as Charles R. Knight and Burian, which means that some of it was outdated at the time it was made. In the late 1990s, Sibbick adapted to the then growing more "rigorous" approach to palaeoart, championed by artists such as Gregory S. Paul. Sibbick has stated that his depictions of prehistoric life may at times seem conservative, though he noted that choices for how to depict a particular animal often resulted from the opinions and suggestions of the palaeontologists who commissioned him.

== Reception ==
In his 2023 book Monsters, Aliens, and Holes in the Ground, RPG historian Stu Horvath examined the 1986 fantasy role-playing game Warhammer Fantasy Roleplay and noted, "The [game's] art does quite a bit of world building. John Sibbick's iconic cover sets the stage well, with a double dose of mohawks telegraphing a certain amount of 'in-your-face' punk rock attitude inside."

== Influence and legacy ==
Sibbick is world-renowned as a palaeoartist and his work is considered to be highly influential. Sibbick's artwork has been particularly noted for his attention to detail and minutiae; in 2000, Paul Sereno and John Lanzendorf dubbed him the "don of detail". In 2003, the pterosaur Ludodactylus sibbicki was named after Sibbick.

== Notable publications ==
- The Illustrated Encyclopedia of Dinosaurs (1985), by David Norman
- Dinosaurs: A Global View (1990), by Stephen A. Czerkas
- The Illustrated Encyclopedia of Pterosaurs (1991), by Peter Wellnhofer
- Prehistoric Life: The Rise of the Vertebrates (1994), by David Norman
- The Kingfisher Illustrated Dinosaur Encyclopedia (2001), by David Burnie
- The Evolution and Extinction of the Dinosaurs (2005), by David E. Fastovsky and David B. Weishampel
