= Doug Henderson (artist) =

Paleoartist and painter

Douglas Henderson
- Born: 1949 (age 76–77)
- Education: University of Kentucky (geology); Montana State University (printmaking)
- Known for: Paleoart
- Website: douglashendersonehi.com

Douglas Henderson (born 1949), known as Doug Henderson, is an American paleoartist, illustrator and painter specializing in the portrayal of fossil animals and their environments. He lives in Montana.

Henderson is best known for his renditions of prehistoric landscapes and their inhabitants, and for his artistic approach to paleoart through his use of light, shadow, and atmosphere. He has illustrated many books on dinosaurs and extinct life, including Dinosaurs: A Global View, Dinosaurs: The Textbook, Dinosaur Imagery: The Science of Lost Worlds and Jurassic Art - The Lanzendorf Collection, and Maia: A Dinosaur Grows Up.

Henderson played a role in the dinosaur renaissance with his images of dinosaurs and their environments, particularly in illustrating aspects of their behaviour not seen in more traditional restorations. In a 2015 survey of the international paleontological community, Henderson was listed as among the most recognized and influential paleoartists.

As he says himself, he started producing fine art works while hiking in Montana during a winter in his late twenties. He cites the dinosaur culture of the 1950s, including the 1933 movie King Kong, as some of his original inspirations for his artwork. He has worked to produce illustrations for books, museum exhibits, murals, posters, and has also done design work for movies and animation projects. He is credited as a "dinosaur specialist" on the film Jurassic Park, in which his paintings appeared.

Henderson's style of art is widely considered "murky" or "indistinct", or otherwise lacking in detail, which many say adds to the realism of the artwork, as the art is drawn as if drawn from memory of actually seeing the dinosaur in question. Henderson was also very active in the work of paleoart throughout the years of 1986 and 1987, being one of the first artists to produce an image of the Deccan Traps erupting for the book, Dinosaurs: A Global View. Henderson also dislikes digital art and digital renderings of art, and instead favors oil paintings and crude sketches, citing "there is something unsatisfactory about digital illustration—too many renderings of various things tend to look too much alike."

Henderson's art is displayed often in museums and other exhibits of paleontology, often due to his portrayal of landscapes from long ago and presenting them as they would have appeared over millions of years ago.

== The Mudpie Project ==
The Mudpie Project is a large artistic project undertaken by Henderson that aims to capture what Yellowstone National Park would have looked like during the 2 million years of the Pleistocene age.

== Books authored and fully illustrated by Doug Henderson ==
- Dinosaur Tree (all texts and illustrations by Doug Henderson, Bradbury Press, 1994)
- Dinosaur Ghosts: The Mystery of Coelophysis (coauthored with J. Lynett Gillette, Puffin, all illustrations by Doug Henderson, 1997)
- Asteroid Impact (all texts and illustrations by Doug Henderson, Dial Books for Young Readers, 2000)
- Foot Work: Early Drawings 1977-86 (sefpublished, all illustrations by Doug Henderson, 2013)
- Doodles of a Pleistocene Yellowstone (Volume I, sefpublished, all illustrations by Doug Henderson, 2023)
- Doodles of a Pleistocene Yellowstone (Volume II, sefpublished, all illustrations by Doug Henderson, 2024)
- Doodles of a Pleistocene Yellowstone (Volume III, sefpublished, all illustrations by Doug Henderson, 2024)
- Glacial Landscapes of Pleistocene Yellowstone (sefpublished, all illustrations by Doug Henderson, 2024)

== By other authors, books fully or partially illustrated by Doug Henderson ==
- Time Machine 2: Search For Dinosaurs (by David Bischoff, Bantam Books, with fellow illustrator Alex Niño, cover art by William Stout, 1984)
- Time Machine 7: Ice Age Explorer (by Dougal Dixon, Bantam Books, with fellow illustrator Alex Niño, cover art by William Stout, 1985)
- Maia: A Dinosaur Grows Up (by Jack Horner, James Gorman and Jeri D. Walton, Museum of the Rockies, all illustrations by Doug Henderson, 1985)
- The Riddle of the Dinosaur (by John Noble Wilford, Knopf Doubleday Publishing Group, all illustrations by Doug Henderson, 1985)
- Time Machine 22: Last of the Dinosaurs (by Peter Lerangis, Bantam Books, all inner illustrations by Doug Henderson, cover art by Mark Hallett, 1988)
- Dawn of The Dinosaurs: The Triassic in Petrified Forest (by Robert Long and Rose Houk, Petrified Forest Museum Association, all illustrations by Doug Henderson, 1988)
- The News About Dinosaurs (by Patricia Lauber, Bradbury Press, illustrations by Doug Henderson et alii, 1989)
- Dinosaurs: A Global View (by Sylvia J. and Stephen A. Czerkas, Dragon's World, with fellow illustrators John Sibbick and Mark Hallett, 1990)
- Living with Dinosaurs (by Patricia Lauber, Bradbury Press, all illustrations by Doug Henderson, 1991)
- Dinosaurs: The Textbook (by Spencer G. Lucas, Wm. C. Brown, illustrations by Doug Henderson et alii, 1993)
- Familiar Dinosaurs (by Joseph E. Wallace, Chanticleer Press, part of The Audubon Society Pocket Guides collection, with fellow illustrators Donna Braginetz, Michael Cole, Brian Franczak, Edward Heck, Frank Ippolito, Eleanor M. Kish, Vladimir Krb, Michael Rothman, Jan Sovák and Kris Ellingsen, 1993)
- How Dinosaurs Came to Be (by Patricia Lauber, Simon & Schuster, all illustrations by Doug Henderson, 1996)
- Jurassic Park and The Lost World (by Michael Crichton, two-volume set of the famous Crichton novels fully illustrated by Doug Henderson, The Easton Press, 1997)
- Dinosaur Imagery: The Science of Lost Worlds and Jurassic Art - The Lanzendorf Collection (by John W. McCarter and John Lanzendorf, San Diego: Academic Press, illustrations by Doug Henderson et alii, 2000)
- Dawn of The Dinosaurs: Life in the Triassic (by Nicholas Fraser, Indiana University Press, Bloomington & Indianapolis, all illustrations by Doug Henderson, 2006)
- Dinosaur Art: The World's Greatest Paleoart (by Steve White, Titan Books, with fellow illustrators Steve White, Mauricio Antón, John Conway, Julius Csotonyi, Todd Marshall, Raúl Martín, Robert Nicholls, Gregory S. Paul, Luis Rey and John Sibbick, 2012)
- Dawn of the Dinosaurs: The Late Triassic in the American Southwest (by Christa Sadler, William Parker and Sidney Ash, Petrified Forest Museum Association, an update of the 1988 edition, with new illustrations added by Victor O. Leshyk and Jeffrey W. Martz, 2015)
- Dinosaurs of Montana (by Jack Horner and Raymond R. Rogers, Montana Bureau of Mines and Geology, all illustrations by Doug Henderson, 2025)

== Exhibitions ==
- 2006-2009: Fossil Mysteries, San Diego Natural History Museum; Jim Melli (Exhibit Art Director), William Stout (murals), Doug Henderson and Tim Gunther (illustrations), Bill Monteleone (animal models) and Richard Webber (steel sculpture)

== Film and television ==
Henderson's artwork can be seen in television documentary programmes such as Dinosaur!, directed by Robert Guenette in 1985, or two short documentaries of 1991 produced by Earthtalk Studios: A Giant Leap for Dinosaurs and Dinosaur Hunters, both directed by Daniel J. Smith.

Hired as a dinosaur expert, Henderson produced pre-production drawings and paintings for the Jurassic Park franchise but his artwork is also visible in the films themselves. He painted an illustration that served as the big plexiglass painted mural in the visitor center that is seen in Jurassic Park (1993). That mural is seen again in later films in the franchise. Two of his drawings, originally not conceived for the franchise, are visible as decorative art in John Hammond's room in The Lost World: Jurassic Park (1997).
