= Volcano: The Eruption and Healing of Mount St. Helens =

1986 children's science photo book

- Author: Patricia Lauber
- Language: English
- Genre: Science / Geology / Vulcanology
- Publisher: Bradbury Press
- Publication date: 1988
- Publication place: United States
- Pages: 60
- ISBN: 0689716796

Volcano: The Eruption and Healing of Mount St. Helens is a 1986 children's science photo book written by Patricia Lauber. Lauber documents the lead-up to the 1980 eruption of Mount St. Helens, the eruption itself, and the aftermath. It received a Newbery Honor in 1987, and reviewers commended the quality and narrative contribution of the color pictures used throughout the book.

== Summary ==
The book explores Mt. St. Helens' geological history and location, as well as the events preceding the eruption, including the gradual development of the bulge on the mountain's north side.

The volcano erupts on May 18, 1980, creating lahars, pyroclastic flows, avalanches, and other geological hazards which destroy a 230-square-mile area and kill 57 people. In the aftermath, geologists worked to understand both the cause and ecological impact of the eruption, helping to advance understanding in the fields of seismology and vulcanology.

In the aftermath of the destruction from the eruption, surviving underground plants began to colonise the blast area; and burrowing rodents like chipmunks, pocket gophers, and red squirrels returned as well. Over time, the area recovered as more plants and animals returned.

The last section of the book explains the process of subduction, the subduction of the Juan de Fuca continental plate, and how subduction creates volcanoes like Mount St. Helens. It closes with a list of beneficial aspects of volcanic eruptions, like soil formation.
