= David B. Norman =

British paleontologist

David Bruce Norman (born 20 June 1952 in the United Kingdom) is a British paleontologist, Graduate Tutor and Director of Studies at Christ's College, Cambridge, emeritus Professor of Vertebrate Palaeobiology and emeritus curator of vertebrate paleontology at the Sedgwick Museum, Cambridge University. From 1991 to 2011, Norman was also the Sedgwick Museum's director.

== Life and career ==
Norman is a fellow at Christ's College, Cambridge, where he teaches Earth Sciences in the Natural Sciences tripos. A member of the Palaeontological Association, he has studied Iguanodon and also has participated in the studies and scientific surveys included in the dinosaur work The Dinosauria (2nd edition, 2004). The species epithet of Equijubus normani was named in honour of him.

In 2017, Norman was one of three British palaeontologists who proposed a radical new hypothesis for early dinosaur evolution and interrelationships in a paper in the journal Nature. In this work, Matthew Baron, Norman and Paul Barrett suggested that Ornithischia and Theropoda were closely related as part of a new clade that they named Ornithoscelida.

He also possesses a keen interest in rugby, and he regularly referees for Cambridge University.

== Works ==
=== Children's books ===
- The Poster Book of Dinosaurs, Hodder Children's Books, 1988 (illustrations by John Sibbick)
- The Humongous Book of Dinosaurs, Publisher: Stewart, Tabori and Chang (April 1997); ISBN 978-1-55670-596-0
- The Big Book of Dinosaurs, Publisher: Welcome Books (April 2001); ISBN 978-0-941807-48-7
- Dinosaurs Sticker Book, Usborne Sticker Books, 2010, ISBN 978-1-4095-2061-0

=== Popular science books ===
- Spotter's Guide to Dinosaurs & Other Prehistoric Animals, Usborne Publishing, London, 1980 (illustrations by Bob Hersey)
- When Dinosaurs Ruled the Earth, Simon & Schuster, New York, 1985 (illustrations by John Sibbick)
- The Age of Dinosaurs, Hodder Wayland, November 1985
- Dinosaurs!, E.D.C. Publishing, December 1985 (illustrations by Ruth Thomson and Bob Hersey)
- Dinosaur, co-authored with Angela Milner, Dorling Kindersley Eyewitness Books, London, 1989
- Dinosaur!, Publisher: John Wiley & Sons Inc., 1991, ISBN 978-0-13-218140-2 (the official companion to A&E's 1991 four-part television series hosted by Walter Cronkite)
- Prehistoric Life: the rise of the vertebrates, John Wiley & Sons, New York, December 1994 (illustrations by John Sibbick)
- The Smithsonian Handbook to Dinosaurs and Other Prehistoric Animals, co-authored with Hazel Richardson, Dorling Kindersley, 2003, ISBN 978-0-7894-9361-3

=== Scientific books and surveys ===
- The Illustrated Encyclopedia of Dinosaurs, Salamander Books, 1985 (illustrations by John Sibbick)
- Kenneth Carpenter, ed. (2001). "Scelidosaurus: The Earliest Complete Dinosaur". The armored dinosaurs. Indiana University Press. ISBN 978-0-253-33964-5.
- Basal Ornithischia and Basal Thyreophora (co-authored with Lawrence Witmer and David Weishampel), Basal Ornithopoda (co-authored with Hans-Dieter Sues, Lawrence Witmer and Rodolfo Coria), Basal Iguanodontia (co-authored with David B. Weishampel, Halszka Osmólska and Peter Dodson); in The Dinosauria, 2nd edition, 2004 (first edition was published in 1990), edited by David B. Weishampel, Halszka Osmólska and Peter Dodson, University of California Press, ISBN 978-0-520-24209-8
- Dinosaurs: A Very Short Introduction, Oxford University Press, December 2005, ISBN 978-0-19-280419-8
- Butler, Richard J.; Upchurch, Paul; Norman, David B. (January 2008). "The phylogeny of the ornithischian dinosaurs". Journal of Systematic Palaeontology. 6 (1): 1–40. doi:10.1017/S1477201907002271. S2CID 86728076.

== TV documentaries ==
=== Crew member, as a scientific advisor ===
- Walking with Dinosaurs (six-part TV series documentary, BBC, 1999, scientific advisor for the episode "Giant of the Skies", credited as Dr. David Norman)
- Prehistoric Planet (a re-version of Walking with Dinosaurs and Walking with Beasts, by Discovery Channel and NBC, 2002, scientific advisor for the episode "Sky King", credited as Dr. David Norman)

=== On screen, as himself ===
- Dinosaur! (four-part TV series documentary, hosted by Walter Cronkite, A&E, 1991, Norman appears in all four episodes: "The Tale of a Tooth", "The Tale of a Bone", "The Tale of an Egg" and "The Tale of a Feather")
- The Dinosaurs! (television documentary miniseries produced by PBS in 1992)
- Dinosaurs Myths & Reality (TV movie documentary, 1995, Produced by Castle Communications and Cromwell Productions Ltd.)
- The Making of Walking with Dinosaurs (TV movie documentary about the series Walking with Dinosaurs, 1999, "making of" produced and directed by Jasper James for the BBC)

=== Acknowledgements ===
- Lost Worlds, Vanished Lives (TV series documentary, BBC, 1989, Norman is thanked in the episode titled "Dinosaur")
- Charles Darwin and the Tree of Life (TV movie documentary, BBC, 2009, Norman is acknowledged as Dr. David Norman)
