= The Dinosauria =

American dinosaur encyclopedia

- Paperback, first edition
- Editors: David B. Weishampel, Peter Dodson, Halszka Osmólska
- Language: English
- Genre: Reference encyclopedia
- Publisher: University of California Press
- Publication date: 1990 (1st ed.); 2004 (2nd ed.)
- Publication place: USA
- Pages: 733 (1st ed.); 880 (2nd ed.)
- ISBN: 978-0-520-06727-1 1st ed.

The Dinosauria is an encyclopedia on dinosaurs, edited by paleontologists David B. Weishampel, Peter Dodson, and Halszka Osmólska. It has been published in two editions by the University of California Press, with the first edition in 1990 and the second edition in 2004. The book is a single comprehensive text on dinosaurs, with the second edition revised and reorganized to reflect the substantial growth in dinosaur research over the elapsed time.

== Content ==
The first edition of The Dinosauria includes 29 chapters organized into two sections, the first on "Dinosaur Relationships, Biology, and Distribution" and the second on "Dinosaur Taxonomy". This organization separates the book into a first section dedicated to topics that encompass Dinosauria as a whole, while the second focuses on individual taxa, organized by evolutionary group with a comprehensive description of anatomy, relationships, paleoecology, and other aspects of their biology. Each chapter is written by a paleontologist knowledgeable about the topic of group, edited and coordinated by American paleontologists David B. Weishampel and Peter Dodson, and Polish paleontologist Halszka Osmólska. Combined, 23 paleontologists from nine countries contributed to the first edition.

The second edition of The Dinosauria revised and reorganized into 30 chapters organized into two sections, the first on "Dinosaur Systematics" and the second on "Dinosaur Distribution and Biology". The rearrangement into taxonomy first reflects how the taxonomic revisions impact the interpretations of biogeography, paleoecology, and function. Between the publication of the first and second editions, it also became better established that birds were members of Dinosauria, and all Mesozoic birds were also included. Through these changes and expansions, the authorship includes contributions from 44 paleontologists from 13 countries to different chapters, still edited and compiled by Weishampel, Dodson, and Osmólska.

== Reception ==
The book has been described as a "monumental work" with lots of international coverage and shared expertise, succeeding in its goal of being comprehensive and expert in coverage. American paleontologist Kevin Padian noted that it is a good representation of the state of dinosaur research shortly before the time of its publication. It is praised as consistent in approach, with broad coverage of the distribution of dinosaurs globally. Contributions in the first edition by David B. Norman, John Stanton McIntosh and Peter Galton on controversial theropods, sauropods, and prosauropods respectively were noted as particularly exhaustive.

Some criticism of the first edition is the lack of empirical analyses for identifying phylogenetic relationships, less sophistication in presentation than comparable works, and organization prioritizing speculative chapters ahead of their systematic framework. There is also criticism about the emphasis on cladistic relationships described, while sections are organized following Linnaean taxonomy that can conflict or misrepresent cladistic groups.

The publication of the second edition improved upon the first edition while remaining faithful to its original design. The lack of cladistic analyses was remedied, and the taxonomic chapters were placed before the expanded and improved chapters on taphonomy, extinction, physiology and biogeography. However, many authors of the first edition were retained, resulting in some sections representing a divergence from more recent work, especially in the lack of expansion of sauropods and prosauropods into more than single chapters. It reflects well the state of dinosaur paleontology at the time of its publication, and is ordered and easily accessible. British paleontologist Roger Benson suggested that the objective stances taken in the book indicate that it is best intended for a well-informed audience, but that as the definitive reference book it will likely be used as well by those who do not already have a high level of knowledge on the topics. While the second edition embraces phylogenetic methods, it lacks coverage of other comparative methods for biogeography, biomechanics and ecology. Zoologist John Ruben criticised the second edition for its inclusion of discussions of dinosaur endothermy, though studies show endothermy was widespread through theropods and evolved in the Early Jurassic long before the appearance of birds.

== Editions ==
- Weishampel, D.B.; Osmólska, H.; Dodson, P., eds. (1990). The Dinosauria. University of California Press. p. 733. ISBN 0-520-06727-4.
- Weishampel, D.B.; Osmólska, H.; Dodson, P., eds. (2004). The Dinosauria (2nd ed.). University of California Press. p. 880. ISBN 0-520-24209-2.
