= Patricia Lauber =

American young people's author (1924–2010)

Patricia Lauber Frost (5 February 1924 – 12 March 2010) was an American Newbery Honor-winning author of Volcano: The Eruption and Healing of St. Helens (1986). During her writing career, Lauber wrote over a hundred children's books from the 1950s to the 2000s. In addition to writing, she was the chief editor in science for Science World, from 1956 to 1959, and for The New Book of Knowledge, from 1961 to 1967.

== Biography ==
Lauber was born on 5 February 1924 in New York City and moved to Connecticut when she was approximately four years old. During her childhood, Lauber began to write stories after learning how to read. She graduated from Wellesley College in 1945 with a degree in English.

After college, Lauber wrote for Look magazine from 1945 to 1946. She worked for Scholastic Magazine until 1954, after which she joined the publishing company Street & Smith in 1956. She was founding editor-in-chief of Science World between 1956 and 1959, a science magazine for high school students. From 1961 to 1967, she was the chief editor in science and mathematics for The New Book of Knowledge by Grolier, an encyclopedia for young people.

Apart from editing, Lauber became a children's non-fiction writer upon the publication of Magic Up Your Sleeve in 1954. From the 1950s to the 2000s, Lauber wrote about various topics about science, geography and animals. Examples of her non-fictional works include books on Galileo Galilei, Louis Pasteur, the Everglades and whales. During this period, Lauber entered children's fiction in 1955, when she wrote a book about her dog titled Clarence the TV Dog. Spanning the 1960s to the 2000s, Lauber wrote books about animals, while following up Clarence the TV Dog with four additional books.

In 1983, she won the Washington Post/Children's Book Guild Award for her overall contribution to children's non-fiction literature. In 1987, Lauber received a Newbery Honor for Volcano: The Eruption and Healing of Mount St. Helens. Throughout her lifetime, Lauber wrote over 125 children's books. Patricia Lauber was married to Russell Frost III. She died on 12 March 2010 in New Canaan, Connecticut.

== Partial bibliography ==
- Clarence the TV Dog
- Clarence Goes to Town
- Clarence Takes a Vacation (Original Title: Clarence Turns Sea Dog)
- Clarence and the Burglar
- Adventure At Black Rock Cave (1959)
- All About the Planets (1960)
- Everglades Country: A Question of Life or Death (1973)
- Too Much Garbage (1974)
- Tapping Earth's Heat (1978)
- Dinosaurs Walked Here and Other Stories Fossils Tell (1992)
- Seeds: Pop, Stick, Glides (1982)
- Journey to the Planets (1983)
- Volcano: Eruption and Healing of Mount St. Helens (1986)
- Lost Star: The Story of Amelia Earhart (1988)
- Tales Mummies Tell (1992)
