= David B. Weishampel =

American paleontologist

- Born: November 16, 1952 (age 73)
- Scientific career
- Fields: Paleontology
- Workplaces: Johns Hopkins University

Professor David Bruce Weishampel (born November 16, 1952) is an American palaeontologist in the Center for Functional Anatomy and Evolution at Johns Hopkins University School of Medicine. Weishampel received his Ph.D. in Geology from the University of Pennsylvania in 1981. His research focuses include dinosaur systematics, European dinosaurs of the Late Cretaceous, jaw mechanics and herbivory, cladistics and heterochrony and the history of evolutionary biology. Weishampel's best known published work is The Dinosauria University of California Press; 2nd edition (December 1, 2004). He consulted for Jurassic Park and is a good friend of Steven Spielberg. He has received an Academy Scientific and Technical Award.

== Selected publications ==
- Weishampel, D. B., Dodson, P., and Osmólska, H. (eds.). 2004. The Dinosauria. 2nd edition. Berkeley, CA: University of California Press, Berkeley. 833 pp.
- Weishampel, D. B. & White, N. (eds.). 2003. The Dinosaur Papers: 1676-1906. Smithsonian Institution Press, Washington, D. C. 524 pp.
- Weishampel, D.B., C.-M. Jianu, Z. Csiki, and D. B. Norman. 2003. Osteology and phylogeny of Zalmoxes (n.g.), an unusual ornithopod dinosaur from the latest Cretaceous of Romania. J. Syst. Palentol. 1: 123-143.
- Jianu, C. M. & Weishampel, D. B. 1999. The smallest of the largest: a new look at possible dwarfing in sauropod dinosaurs. Geol. Mijnbouw 78: 335-343.
- Weishampel, D. B. 1996. Fossils, phylogeny, and discovery: a cladistic study of the history of tree topologies and ghost lineage durations. J. Vert. Paleont. 16: 191 197.
- Weishampel, D. B. 1995. Fossils, function, and phylogeny. In: Thomason, J. (ed.). Functional Morphology in Vertebrate Paleontology. Cambridge Univ. Press, New York. pp. 34–54.
- Weishampel, D. B. & Horner, J. R. 1994. Life history syndromes, heterochrony, and the evolution of Dinosauria. In: Carpenter, K., Horner, J. R., & Hirsch, K. (eds.). Dinosaur Eggs and Babies. Cambridge Univ. Press, New York. pp. 229 243.
- Heinrich, R. E., Ruff, C. B., & Weishampel, D. B. 1993. Femoral ontogeny and locomotor biomechanics of Dryosaurus lettowvorbecki (Dinosauria, Iguanodontia). Zool. J. Linn. Soc. 108: 179 196.
- Weishampel, D. B., Norman, D. B., & Grigorescu, D. 1993. Telmatosaurus transsylvanicus from the Late Cretaceous of Romania: the most basal hadrosaurid. Palaeontology 36: 361 385.
- Weishampel, D. B. 1993. Beams and machines: modeling approaches to analysis of skull form and function. In: Hanken, J. & Hall, B. K. (eds.) The Vertebrate Skull. Univ. Chicago Press, Chicago. pp. 303 344.
- Weishampel, D. B., Grigorescu, D., & Norman, D. B. 1991. The dinosaurs of Transylvania: island biogeography in the Late Cretaceous. Natl. Geogr. Res. 7: 68 87.
- Weishampel, D. B. 1991. A theoretical morphologic approach to tooth replacement in lower vertebrates. In: Vogel, K. & Schmidt Kittler, N. (eds.). Constructional Morphology and Biomechanics: Concepts and Implications. Springer Verlag, Berlin. pp. 295 310.
