= Peter Dodson =

American paleontologist (born 1946)

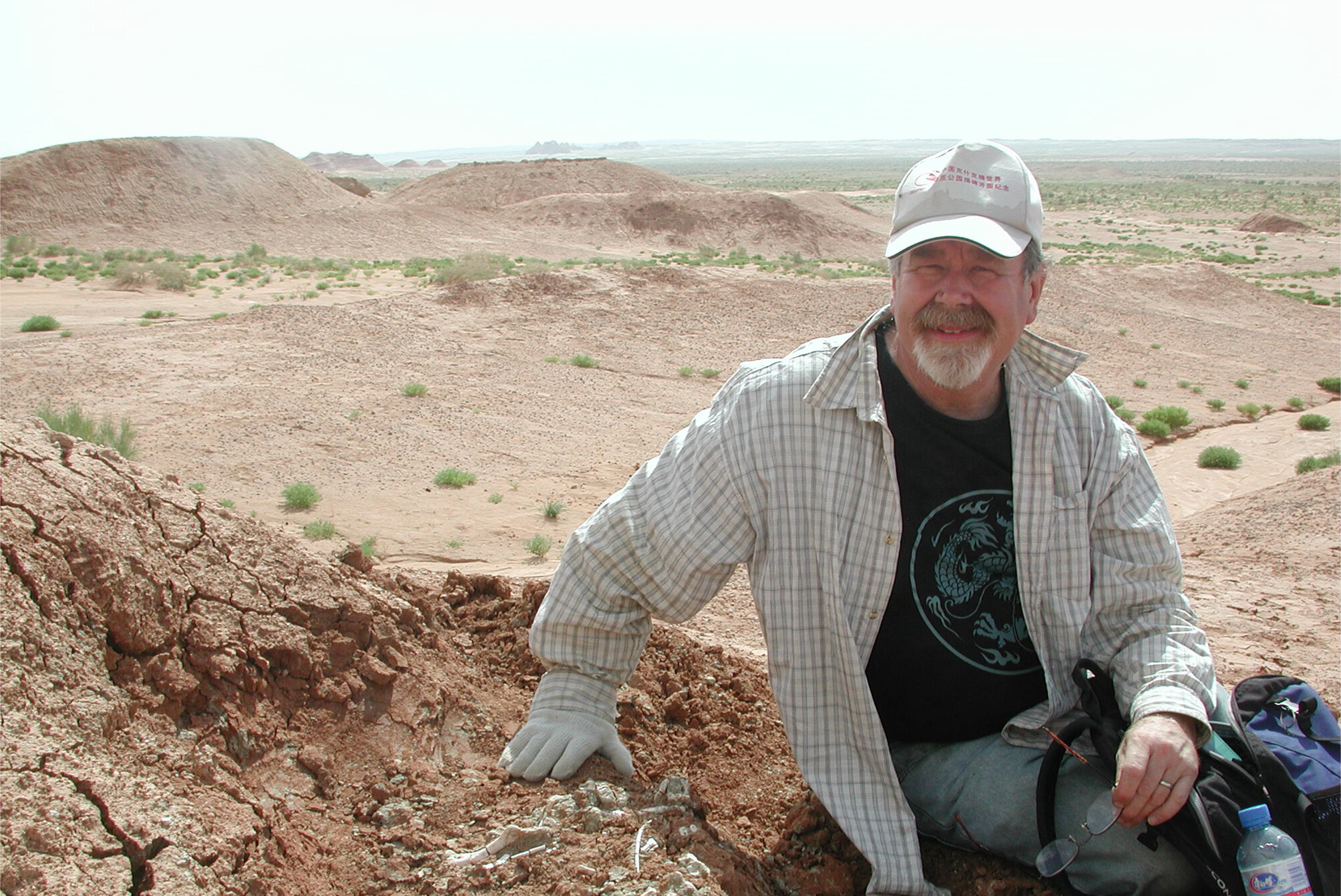
- Dodson examining a specimen of Auroraceratops
- Born: August 20, 1946 (age 80)
- Education: University of Ottawa (BSc, Geology, 1968); University of Alberta (MSc, Geology/Paleontology, 1970); Yale University (PhD, Geology/Paleontology, 1974)
- Known for: Important contributions to the study of vertebrate paleontology
- Scientific career
- Fields: Vertebrate paleontology
- Workplaces: University of Pennsylvania School of Veterinary Medicine
- Author abbrev. (zoology): Dodson

Peter Dodson (born August 20, 1946) is an American paleontologist who has published many papers and written and collaborated on books about dinosaurs. An authority on Ceratopsians, he has also authored several papers and textbooks on hadrosaurs and sauropods, and is a co-editor of The Dinosauria, widely considered the definitive scholarly reference on dinosaurs. Dodson described Avaceratops in 1986; Suuwassea in 2004, and many others, while his students have named Paralititan and Auroraceratops. He has conducted field research in Canada, the United States, India, Madagascar, Egypt, Argentina, and China. A professor of vertebrate paleontology and of veterinary anatomy at the University of Pennsylvania, Dodson has also taught courses in geology, history, history and sociology of science, and religious studies. Dodson is also a research associate at the Academy of Natural Sciences. In 2001, two former students named an ancient frog species, Nezpercius dodsoni, after him (as well as after the Native American Nez Perce people). Dodson has also been skeptical to the theory of a dinosaurian origin of birds, but more recently has come down on the side of this theory.

== Religious views ==
Describing himself as a "deeply committed Christian," Dodson is a Roman Catholic who subscribes to theistic evolution and has argued that there is no real conflict between religion and science, writing that: "I have found little if anything to support or necessitate the warlike antagonism between science and religion pictured by Dawkins and like-minded scientists, who are animated by motives other than pure, disinterested science." Dodson has written numerous essays on the topic of religious belief and science, and has served on the Board of Directors for the nonprofit New York City-based Metanexus Institute.

== Publications ==
=== Books ===
- Dodson, P. (1996). The Horned Dinosaurs: A Natural History. Princeton University Press. ISBN 978-0-691-02882-8. LCCN 96000105. OCLC 34114820. OL 963887M. Wikidata Q106243480.
- D. Weishampel; P. Dodson; H. Osmólska, eds. (1990), The Dinosauria (2nd ed.), Berkeley: University of California Press, OCLC 154697781, OL 16803382W, Wikidata Q7730227
