= Mark Hallett (artist) =

American artist (born 1947)

Mark Hallett (born November 21, 1947) is an American artist best known for his illustrations of dinosaurs and other prehistoric animals. Having originally coined the term "paleoart" to refer to science-based paleontological illustration, Hallett remains one of the most influential masters of modern dinosaur imagery. He currently lives in Dallas, Oregon.

== Biography ==
Hallett has considered himself a paleoartist since 1974 and he began his work at the San Diego Natural History Museum. He has been published in a number of museums, magazines and books including Life, Smithsonian, and National Geographic. He has worked as a teacher, a designer and an art director, and was also a consultant on the major films Jurassic Park and Disney's Dinosaur. In 1986, Hallett's paleontological paintings experienced a major tour in the United States, the United Kingdom, continental Europe, Japan and Australia, and appeared in numerous museums including the American Museum of Natural History and the Smithsonian National Museum of Natural History. He is also the recipient of several major awards, including the annual Lanzendorf Paleoart Prize given out by the Society of Vertebrate Paleontology, which he won in 2002.

Hallett cites the painter Charles R. Knight as one of his major influences. He describes his process of creating artwork as first preparing for weeks researching the available material including original fossils, consulting with paleontologists on likely behavior, and researching modern analogues before starting sketches of the anatomy and scenes for the final painting.
