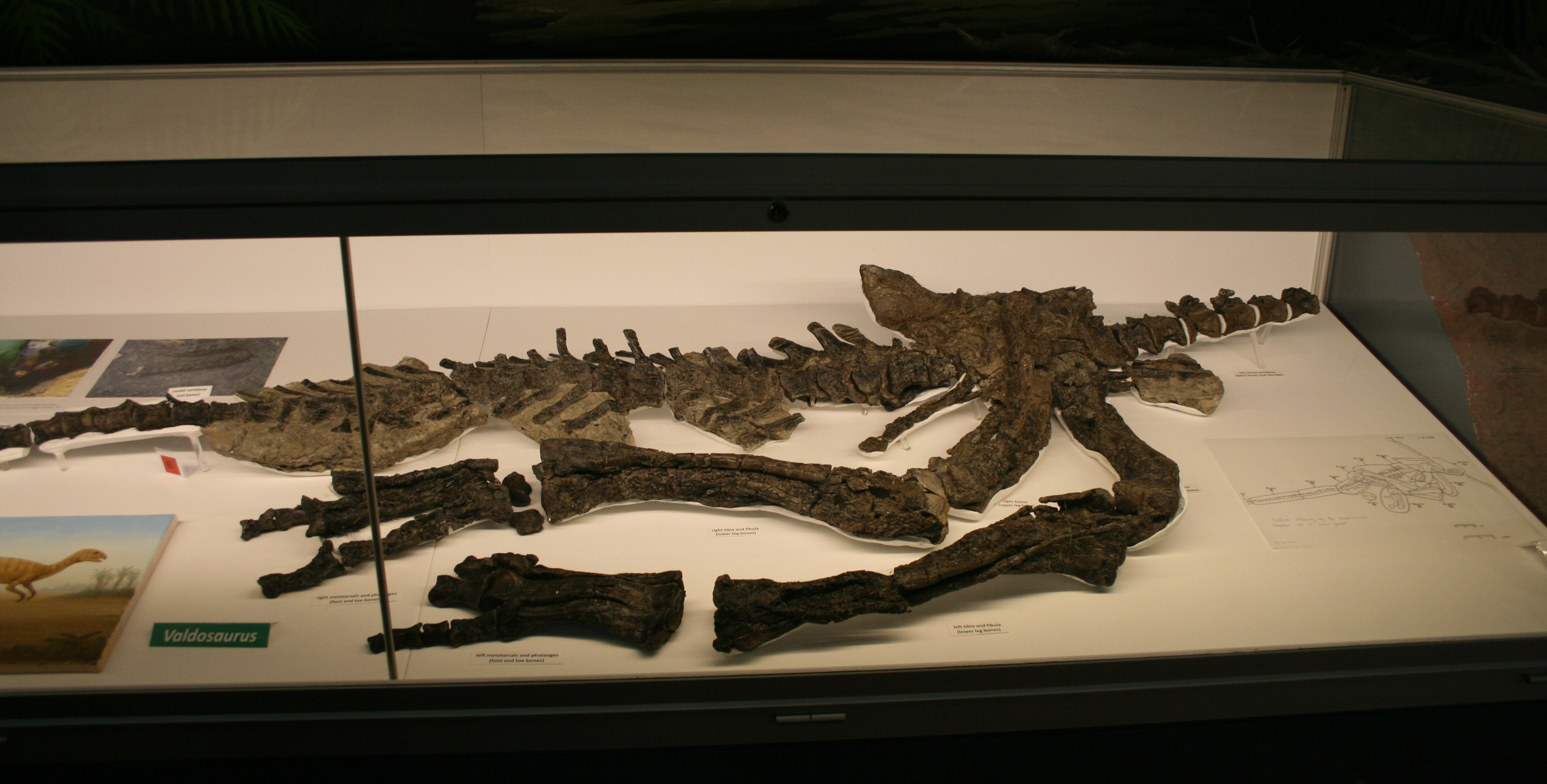
- Assigned skeleton at Dinosaur Isle Museum

Scientific classification
- Kingdom: Animalia
- Phylum: Chordata
- Class: Reptilia
- Clade: Dinosauria
- Clade: †Ornithischia
- Clade: †Ornithopoda
- Family: †Dryosauridae
- Genus: †Valdosaurus; Galton, 1977
- Species: †V. canaliculatus

Binomial name
- †Valdosaurus canaliculatus Galton, 1977 (Galton, 1975)

Synonyms
- Camptosaurus valdensis Richard Lydekker, 1889; Dryosaurus canaliculatus Peter Galton, 1975; Valdosaurus dextrapoda? Blows, 1988

= Valdosaurus =

Valdosaurus Temporal range: Early Cretaceous, 140–121 Ma

Extinct genus of dinosaurs

Valdosaurus ("Weald lizard") is a genus of bipedal herbivorous dryosaurid dinosaur known from the Early Cretaceous of the Isle of Wight and elsewhere in England. Originally its remains were believed to belong to Hypsilophodon. In 1889, Richard Lydekker assigned them to Camptosaurus, alongside a partial lower jaw, and applied the name Camptosaurus valdensis. In the 1970s, Peter Galton reassigned these remains to a new species of Dryosaurus, then to an entirely new genus and species, that being Valdosaurus proper. The type and only species of Valdosaurus, named by Galton, is V. canaliculatus.

Numerous specimens have been assigned to Valdosaurus over the years. Some, namely those found in Niger (now Elrhazosaurus), have been reassigned to different genera, while others have simply been redesignated as indeterminate. With that said, additional specimens of V. canaliculatus have been discovered. The most complete is a specimen discovered in 2012 at Compton Bay on the Isle of Wight, which consists of a largely articulated rear half of the animal. Whereas the type specimens were very small, with a femur (thigh bone) length of just 14 cm (0.46 ft) and an estimated body mass of 10 kg (22 lb), larger specimens such as the Compton specimen may have reached body lengths of around 4 m (13 ft) and body masses of roughly 400 kg (880 lb).

== Discovery and naming ==
At some point in the 19th century, the Rev. William Fox collected two small femora (upper leg bones) near Cowleaze Chine on the south-west coast of the Isle of Wight. In 1888, these specimens, BMNH R184 and R185, were assigned to Hypsilophodon foxii by Richard Lydekker. The femora were associated with a tibia, and were subsequently assigned to the possible tyrannosauroid genus Calamosaurus. In 1889, Lydekker assigned them to Camptosaurus, alongside a partial mandibular ramus (half of a lower jaw), BMNH R180, applying the species name C. valdensis to all of these remains. The species name, valdensis derives from valdo, a modification of the Old English word weald ("a wood") which refers to the Weald area.

In a 1974 paper, Peter Galton examined the holotype femur of C. valdensis, and came to the conclusion that it belonged to a large specimen of Hypsilophodon; he believed, as had been suggested by Sir Richard Owen more than a century prior, that BMNH R180 belonged to a juvenile Iguanodon. In 1975, Galton re-examined the femora, and concluded that they did not belong to Camptosaurus. He therefore assigned them to Dryosaurus, and applied the name Dryosaurus canaliculatus. The specific name means "with a small channel" in Latin, referring to a distinct groove between the condyles of the lower femora. Two years later, Galton recognised that they were in fact morphologically distinct from Dryosaurus, and erected a new genus for them, Valdosaurus. The type species, D. canaliculatus, was thus renamed V. canaliculatus. Galton speculated that Valdosaurus might have been a direct descendant of Dryosaurus, based on the supposed ubiquity of that genus across Europe, Africa, and Asia. Furthermore, Galton reassigned BMNH R180 to Valdosaurus, after briefly and provisionally considering it a specimen of Vectisaurus.

=== Additional remains and reassigned species ===
A second species, V. nigeriensis, was described by Galton and Philippe Taquet from younger rocks from Niger in 1982. In 1998 William Blows inadvertently named another species, Valdosaurus dextrapoda, by including this name in a fauna list. This was an error, and the species has never been supported. In 2009, Galton reviewed the Valdosaurus material. He concluded that no fossils from outside England could be reliably referred to the genus. He thus gave V. nigeriensis its own genus: Elrhazosaurus. Even where many of the English specimens were concerned it was uncertain whether they belonged to Valdosaurus, including all cranial elements and teeth. Some hindlimb and pelvic bones from the Upper Weald Clay Formation (late Barremian) were referable to V. canaliculatus. Some material from the earlier Hastings Beds (Valanginian) were referred to a Valdosaurus sp. Galton established that Richard Owen had in 1842 been the first to describe Valdosaurus thighbones, specimens BMB 004297-004300, assigning them to Iguanodon.

Having a close European relative of the American form Dryosaurus named led to most of the dryosaurid fossil material of Europe being referred to Valdosaurus. Valdosaurus was seen as not only present in England (the Wessex Formation of the Isle of Wight and the Hastings Beds of West Sussex). Records from Spain remain questionable. These rock units were deposited between the Berriasian and Barremian stages, between approximately 145 and 125 million years ago. V. canaliculatus would then be known from thigh bones, extensive additional postcranial elements, partial lower jaws, and teeth.

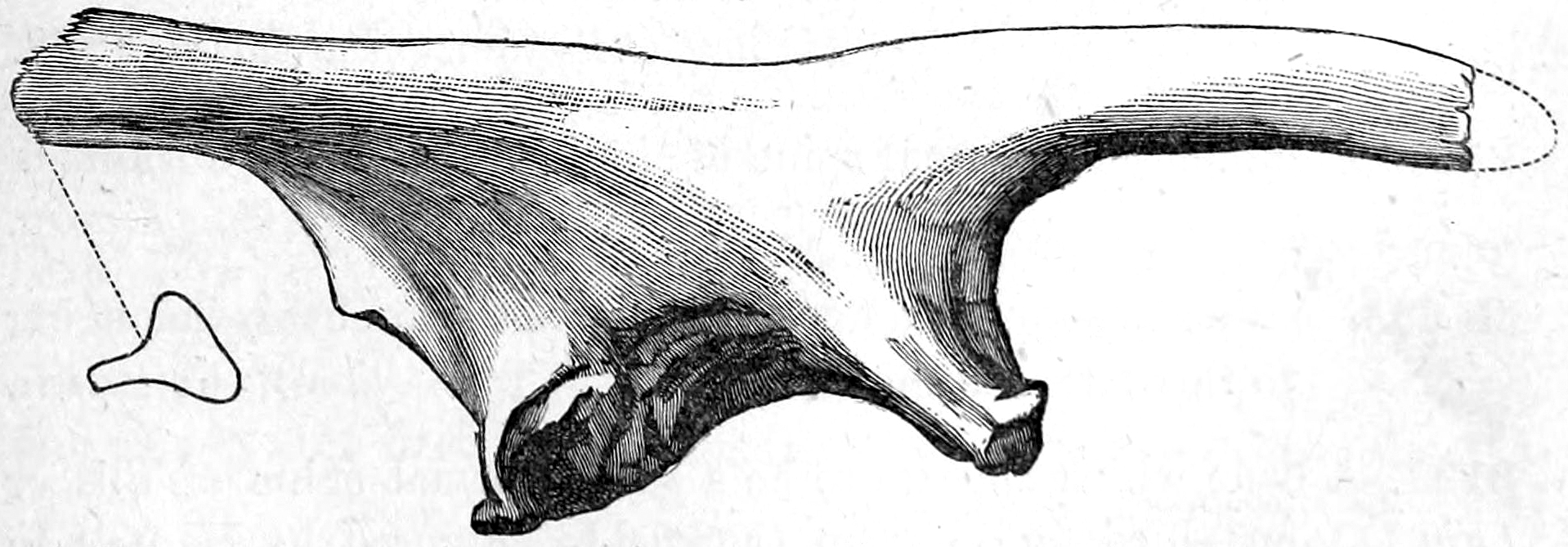
Valdosaurus sp. ilia, NHM 2150, from the Upper Tunbridge Wells Sand of Cuckfield

In 1888, Richard Lydekker described an ilium, BMNH R2150 from Sussex, assigning it to Hylaeosaurus. That specimen was subsequently assigned to Valdosaurus canaliculatus. In 2012, a new specimen of Valdosaurus was discovered, in Compton Bay on the Isle of Wight, by Nick Chase; the exact location of its discovery has been withheld to prevent attempts to steal material from the site. The specimen, since designated IWCMS 2013.175, is the most complete Valdosaurus yet found. It was found partly articulated and includes a partial dorsal (back) series, an almost complete caudal (tail) series, pelvic material, and both hind limbs. In life, the specimen would have been around 4 m (13 ft) long.

== Description ==
=== Size ===
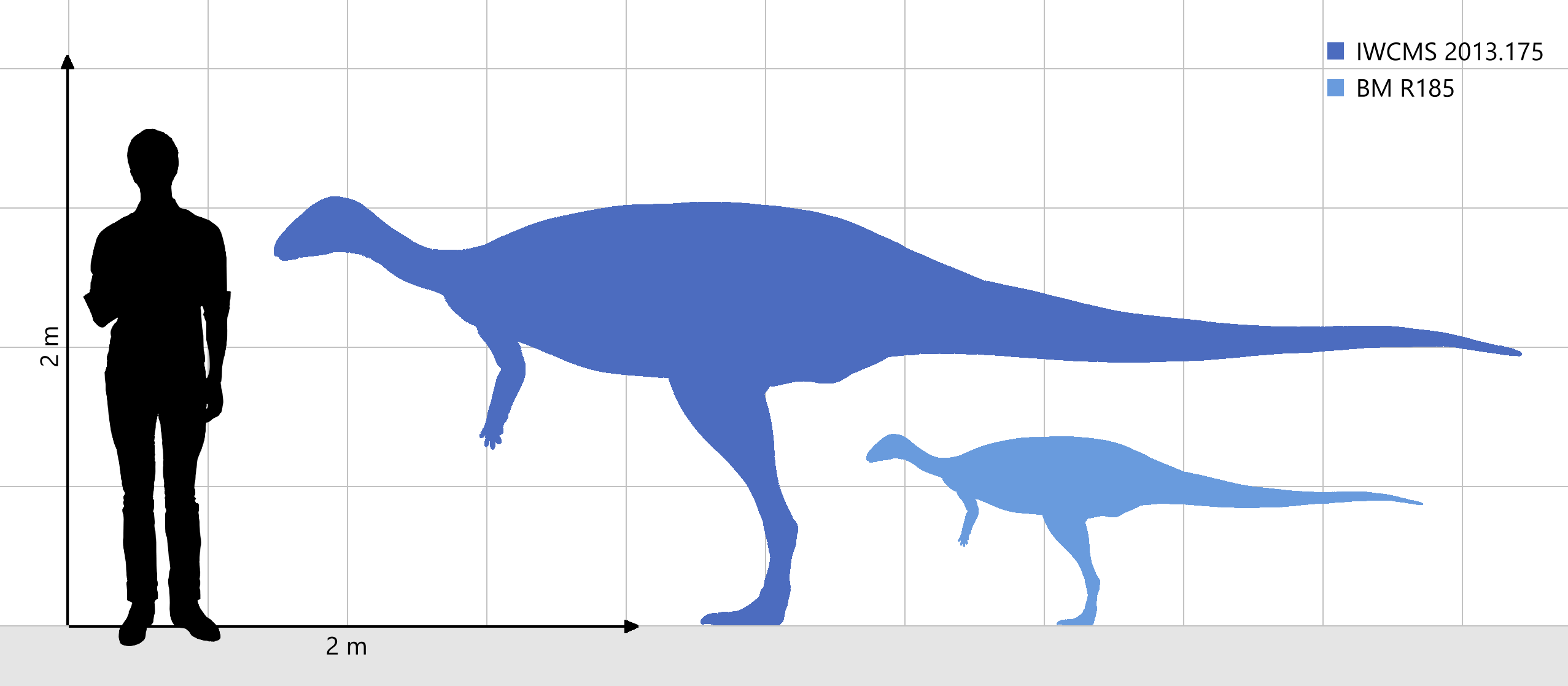
Size diagram of two Valdosaurus specimens: the holotype, BM R185, and an assigned specimen, IWCMS 2013.175

In his 2009 re-examination of Valdosaurus, Peter Galton emphasised that though the type femora were very small, 14 cm (0.46 ft) in length, which has led to estimates of a length of 1.2 m (3.9 ft) and a weight of 10 kg (22 lb), they came from a juvenile individual; an adult would have been a "medium-sized euornithopod", with femora reaching a length of something like 50 cm (1.6 ft), a length attained by specimen MIWG.6879 (a complete hind limb). In 2001, Darren Naish and David Martill suggested based on that specimen that skeletally mature V. canaliculatus would have a maximum body length of about 4 m (13 ft), a shoulder height of about 1.4 m (4.6 ft), and a body mass of 400 kg (880 lb), though most specimens were about 3.5 m (11 ft) in length.

=== Skeleton ===
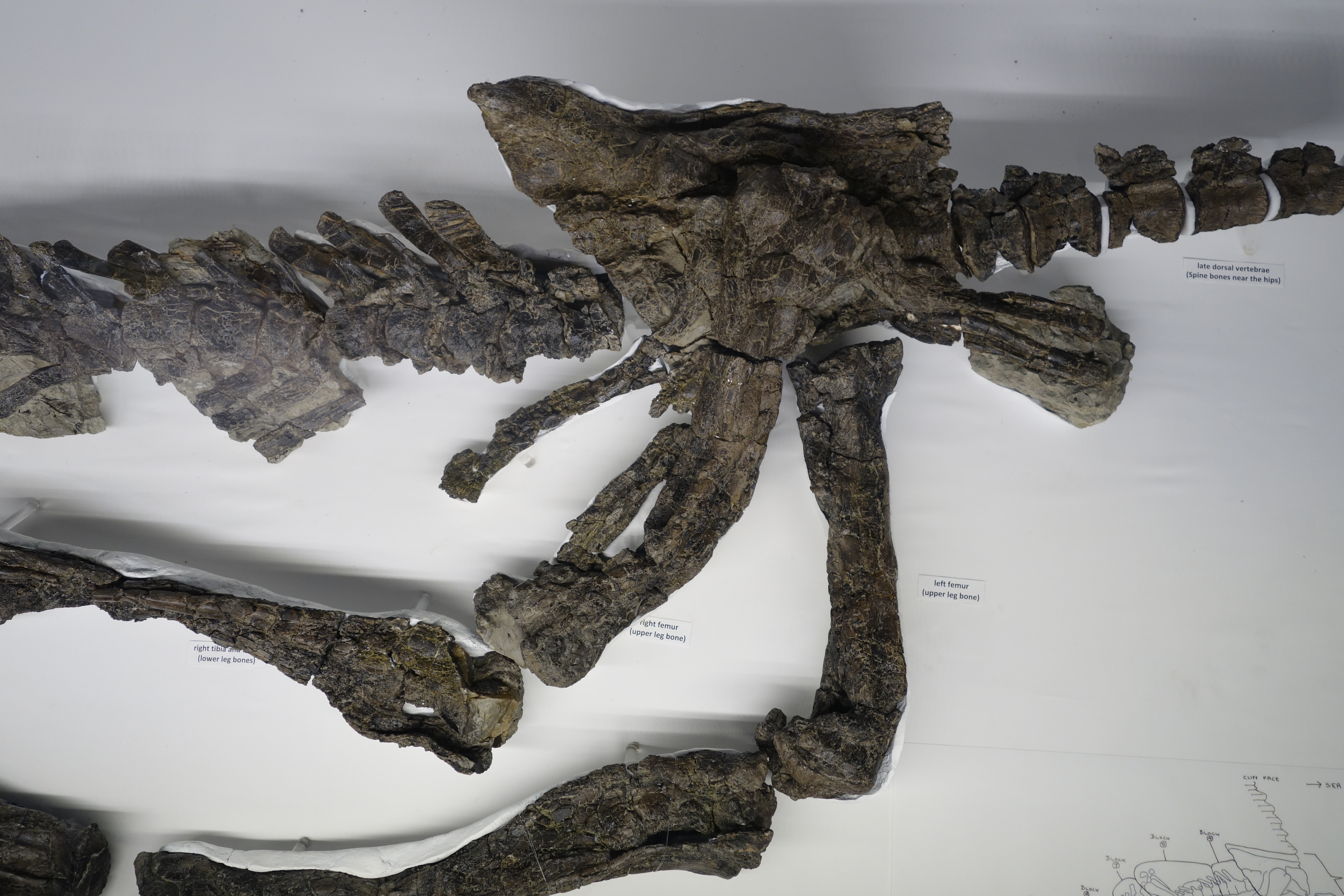
Tail base, pelvic girdle, dorsal vertebrae, and limbs of the assigned specimen IWCMS 2013.175

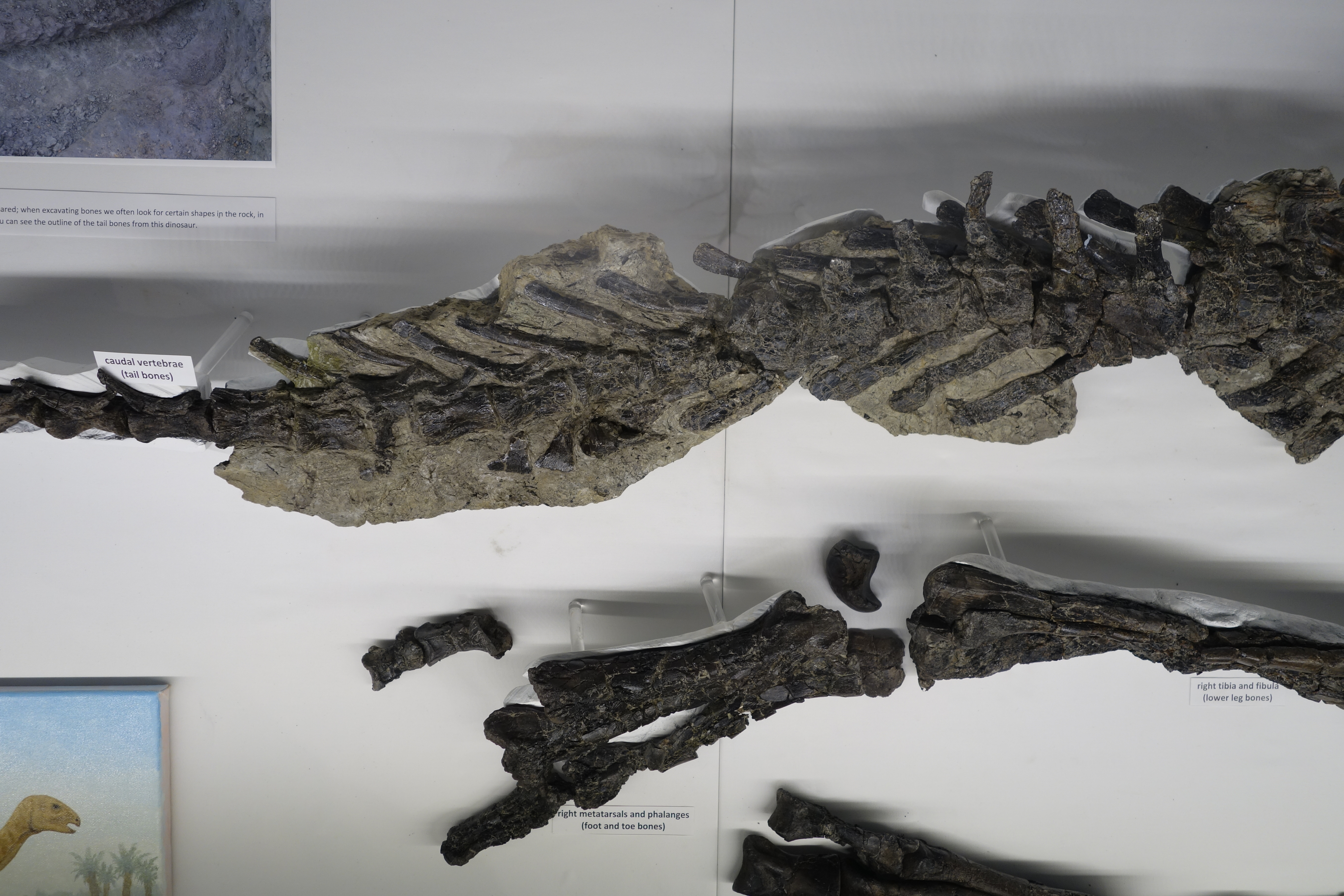
Tail and lower leg of the assigned specimen IWCMS 2013.175

The most complete specimen of Valdosaurus, IWCMS 2013.175, preserves six dorsal (back) vertebrae. The best preserved is the first in the sequence, which preserves a complete centrum (main body) and part of the neural arch, minus the articular processes. Based on this vertebra, the neural arches would have extended for almost the full lengths of the centra. There is no indication that parapophyses were present, suggesting that they had completely fused with the diapophyses, which are unpreserved. At the base of the anterior (front) surface of the neural spine is a small, elliptical fossa. While the sacrum (a bony structure over the hips consisting of fused vertebrae) is preserved, it is largely obscured by the ilia. The exact number of sacral vertebrae is unclear, though was likely between five and six. IWCMS 2013.175 preserves most, if not all of the caudal (tail) vertebrae, 45 in total, and bears the most complete tail of any described dryosaurid. Many of the vertebrae are not only fully preserved, but are also articulated. The caudal vertebrae of Valdosaurus differ from those of other ornithischians in that the vertebrae in the middle of the caudal series have neural spines (the tall, dorsal/upper midline structures) which are lengthened and backswept to such an extent that each overhangs more than one postceding vertebra. The morphology of the caudal vertebrae shifts from the proximal vertebrae to those in the middle, with, for example, the chevrons being far smaller, roughly equal in length to the vertebral centra to which they attach. Several ossified tendons are preserved.

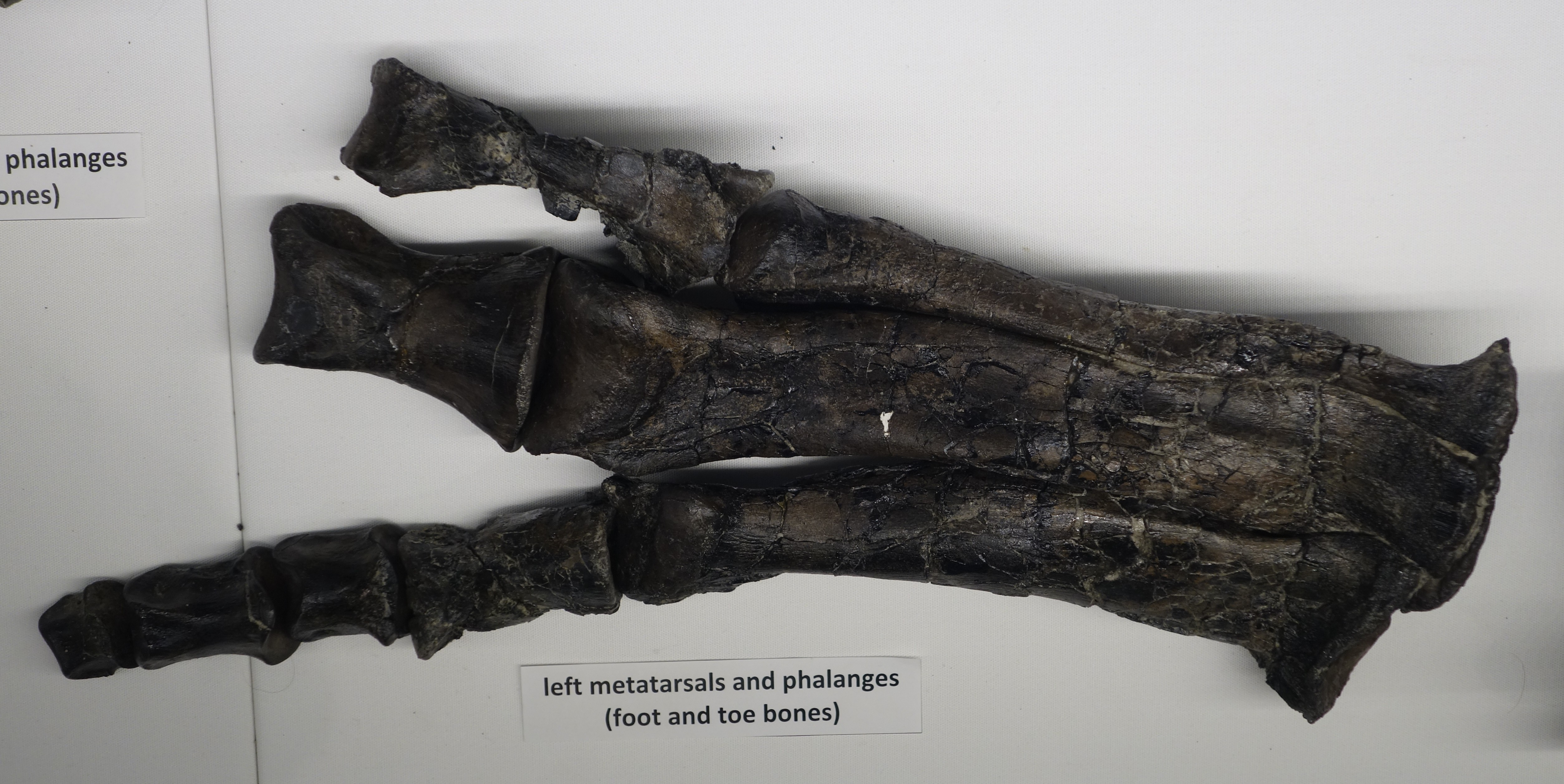
Metatarsals and phalanges of IWCMS 2013.175

Both of IWCMS 2013.175's ilia are fairly complete. Each is long and low, with a sinuous dorsal (upper) margin. Both ischia are also known, though the femora and surrounding matrix obscure their proximal parts and their shafts are poorly preserved. In other dryosaurids, the obturator notch on the pubis (to which certain obturator muscles attached) is closed, but in V. canaliculatus, it is open. Valdosaurus' hind limbs are well known from various specimens. The fourth trochanter, the structure on the femur to which the caudofemoralis muscle would have attached, is on the proximal (closer) half of the femoral shaft. The lesser trochanter of the femur is rod-like, and is separated from the greater trochanter by a cleft. There is no evidence that V. canaliculatus retained its first or fifth metatarsals.

== Classification ==
Galton assigned Valdosaurus to the Hypsilophodontidae, using an older and broader definition, wherein it is paraphyletic. This definition of hypsilophodontids has been largely abandoned in favour of a more restrictive one. In 1972, before the proper naming of Valdosaurus, Galton suggested that it was the endpoint of a lineage starting with "Camptosaurus" leedsi (now Callovosaurus), and continued by Dysalotosaurus, Dryosaurus, and then Valdosaurus itself.

A cladogram depicting the ornithischian interrelationships suggested by Galton is as follows:

- Ornithischia
  - Fabrosaurus -> Echinodon
  - - Heterodontosaurus
    - Ankylosauria
    - Stegosauria
    - Pisanosaurus ->
      - - Hadrosauridae
        - Iguanodon -> Tenontosaurus
      - - - Ceratopsia
          - Stenopelix -> Psittacosaurus
        - - Camptosaurus leedsi -> Dysalotosaurus -> Dryosaurus -> Wealden ornithopod
          - - Camptosaurus
            - - Yaverlandia -> Stegoceras -> Pachycephalosaurus
              - - Laosaurus
                  - Parksosaurus
                  - Hypsilophodon
                    - Laosaurus minimus
                    - Thescelosaurus

Today Valdosaurus is generally considered a member of the Dryosauridae. A particularly close relationship with Elrhazosaurus from the Early Cretaceous of North Africa, (and which was formerly considered a species of Valdosaurus) has been proposed. Cladogram from Madzia, et al. 2020:

- Iguanodontia
  - Rhabdodontidae
    - Rhabdodon spp.
    - - Zalmoxes robustus
      - - Mochlodon vorosi
        - Zalmoxes shqiperorum
  - - - Tenontosaurus tilletti
      - Tenontosaurus dossi
    - Dryomorpha
      - Ankylopollexia
      - Dryosauridae
        - Eousdryosaurus nanohallucis
        - "Camptosaurus" valdensis
        - Callovosaurus leedsi
        - Dysalotosaurus lettowvorbecki
        - Dryosaurus altus
        - - Valdosaurus canaliculatus
          - Elrhazosaurus nigeriensis

== Palaeoenvironments ==
=== Hastings Beds/Lower Wealden ===
Whilst most remains assigned to Valdosaurus come from the Isle of Wight, remains from the Grinstead Clay Member of the Tunbridge Wells Sand Formation, part of the Lower Wealden (or Hasting Beds) of Sussex, have also been assigned to it, though have also been regarded as indeterminate dryosaurids. Regardless, specimens assigned to Valdosaurus are known from the Hasting Beds. Also known from the Hasting Beds are the theropods "Megalosaurus" dunkeri and Valdoraptor, the indeterminate avialan Wyleyia, the titanosauriform sauropod Pelorosaurus, another indeterminate sauropod, the indeterminate thyreophoran Regnosaurus, the ankylosaurian Hylaeosaurus, and several specimens assigned to Iguanodon. The Lower Wealden has been dated to the late Berriasian–Valanginian.

=== Wessex Formation ===
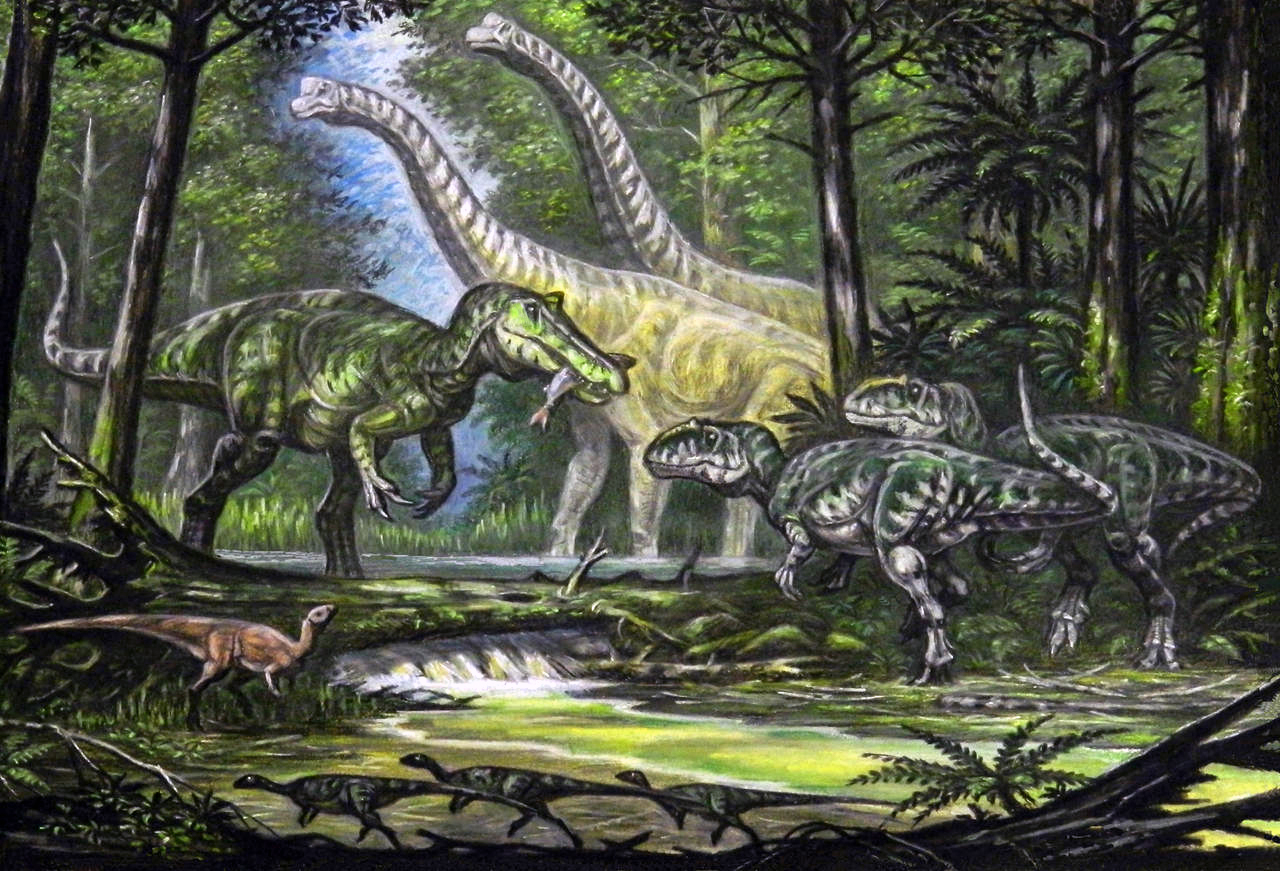
Life restoration of Valdosaurus (midground, left) with contemporary dinosaurs: Eucamerotus (background), Baryonyx (left), two Neovenator (right), and Hypsilophodon (foreground).

The holotype of Valdosaurus heralds from the Wessex Formation, dated from the Hauterivian to the Barremian. Sedimentological data suggests that the depositional environment of the Wessex Formation was a floodplain intersected by fluvial (river) and lacustrine (lake) deposits. Water levels likely varied throughout the year, due to there being more evaporation than precipitation, though precipitation was regardless quite high. The Wessex seems to have regularly experienced extreme storms and periodic flood events, resulting in debris flows which would have deposited dead organisms in ponds. Burned plant and insect material and fusain suggests that the environment experienced frequent wildfires, stifling for the most part the dense growth of gymnosperms. Much of the flora of the formed of low ground cover, consisting primarily of pteridophytes, with occasional stands of conifers, cycads and the tree fern Tempskya. Most vertebrate material from the Wessex Formation originates from plant debris beds, resulting from the aforementioned flooding events.

Aside from Thecocoelurus, the dinosaur fauna of the Isle of Wight includes the theropods Aristosuchus, Calamosaurus, Calamospondylus, Ceratosuchops, Eotyrannus, Neovenator, Ornithodesmus, Riparovenator, Thecocoelurus, and Yaverlandia, the sauropods Chondrosteosaurus, Eucamerotus and Ornithopsis, the thyreophorans Polacanthus and Vectipelta, and the ornithopods Brighstoneus, Comptonatus, Hypsilophodon, Iguanodon, Mantellisaurus, and Vectidromeus. The pterosaur fauna of the Wessex Formation consists of Coloborhynchus, Caulkicephalus, Istiodactylus, Vectidraco, and Wightia; multiple unnamed pterosaur taxa, including a ctenochasmatid, are also known. Neosuchian crocodyliforms include Bernissartia, Koumpiodontosuchus and Vectisuchus. Limited evidence exists of elasmosaurids and leptocleidid plesiosaurs. The mammal fauna of the Wessex Formation includes the multituberculate Eobataar and the spalacotheriid Yaverlestes. Albanerpetontid amphibians are represented by Wesserpeton. The fish fauna of the Wessex Formation, both bony and cartilaginous, is extensive, including hybodontiform and modern sharks (Selachii), pycnodontiforms, Lepidotes and Scheenstia. Invertebrates are represented by an assortment of non-biting midges, hymenopterans (wasps) including multiple parasitoid taxa, coleopterans (beetles), the avicularoid spider Cretamygale, and the ostracod Cypridea.

== See also ==
- Dinosaurs of the Isle of Wight
