= Eousdryosaurus =

Eousdryosaurus Temporal range: Late Jurassic, 152 Ma

Scientific classification
- Kingdom: Animalia
- Phylum: Chordata
- Class: Reptilia
- Clade: Dinosauria
- Clade: †Ornithischia
- Clade: †Ornithopoda
- Family: †Dryosauridae
- Genus: †Eousdryosaurus; Escaso et al., 2014
- Species: †E. nanohallucis

Binomial name
- †Eousdryosaurus nanohallucis Escaso et al., 2014

Genus of dinosaurs

Eousdryosaurus ("eastern Dryosaurus") is a genus of basal iguanodontian dinosaur known from a partial skeleton discovered in Upper Jurassic rocks in western Portugal. The type, and only species, is Eousdryosaurus nanohallucis, named and described in 2014.

== Discovery and naming ==
Eousdryosaurus is based on SHN(JJS)-170, kept in the Sociedade de História Natural in Torres Vedras, Portugal. The articulated and well-preserved specimen includes a hip vertebra and eight vertebrae from the proximal part of the tail, their chevrons, the left ilium, the entire left leg, and the right thigh bone (femur). These bones were discovered in sandstone of the late Kimmeridgian-age (late Jurassic, approximately 152 million years old) Praia da Amoreira-Porto Novo Member of the Lourinhã Formation in Porto das Barcas, Lourinhã, Portugal. The genus name is a reference to Eousdryosaurus being a relative of Dryosaurus on the east side of the Atlantic Ocean. The type and only species is E. nanohallucis, meaning "small hallux", in reference to the small size of that toe. Eousdryosaurus was named in 2014 by Fernando Escaso and colleagues, after having been described briefly in 2000.

== Description ==
The only known individual of Eousdryosaurus was a small dryosaurid, estimated at 1.6 metres (5.2 ft) in length, comparable to immature individuals of Dryosaurus and Dysalotosaurus. The right femur measures 188.5 millimetres (7.42 in) long and the left shin bone (tibia) measures 200 millimetres (7.9 in) long.

It is differentiated from other dryosaurids by various details of the vertebrae, hip, and hind limb. The foot is unique among ornithopods in that the first digit (the hallux or big toe) includes a single phalanx bone; most basal ornithopods had two phalanges, and most derived ornithopods, including hadrosaurs ("duckbills"), lost this digit.

== Classification ==
Escaso et al. performed a phylogenetic analysis and found Eousdryosaurus to be a basal dryosaurid within the Dryomorpha, a type of small bipedal herbivore near the base of Iguanodontia.

On the other hand, Dieudonné et al. (2020) found Eousdryosaurus to be a sister taxon to the Elasmaria.

In their 2024 description of the contemporary Hesperonyx, Rotatori et al. found support for a dryosaurid position of Eousdryosaurus in both their parsimony and Bayesian analyses, contrasting with the suggestions of Dieudonné et al. (2020). Their results are displayed in the cladogram below:

- Iguanodontia
  - Tenontosaurus spp.
  - - Rhabdodontomorpha
    - - Elasmaria
      - Dryomorpha
        - Dryosauridae
          - Eousdryosaurus
          - - Valdosaurus
            - Dysalotosaurus
            - Dryosaurus spp.
        - - Hesperonyx
          - - Uteodon
            - - SHN.015.JJS.LPP
              - - Draconyx
                - Ankylopollexia
                  - Iguanodon bernissartensis
                  - Camptosaurus
