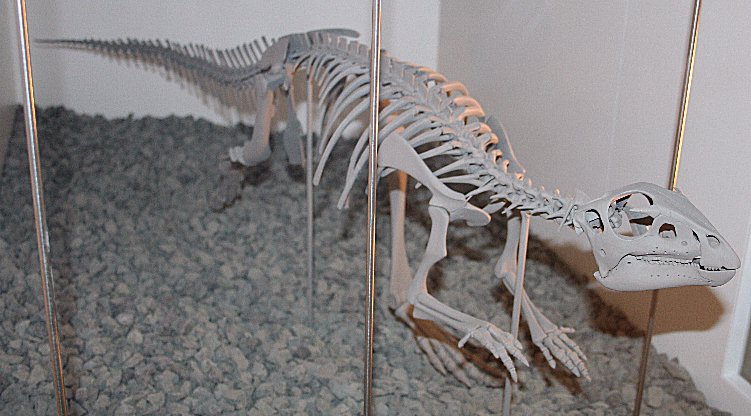
- Hypsilophodon skeleton

Scientific classification
- Kingdom: Animalia
- Phylum: Chordata
- Class: Reptilia
- Clade: Dinosauria
- Clade: †Ornithischia
- Clade: †Clypeodonta
- Family: †Hypsilophodontidae; Dollo, 1882

Subgroups
- †Gideonmantellia?; †Hypsilophodon; †Vectidromeus?

Synonyms
- Laosauridae Marsh, 1895; Hypsilophodontinae Nopcsa, 1928; Hypsilophodontia Cooper, 1985

= Hypsilophodontidae =

Hypsilophodontidae Temporal range: Early Cretaceous, 130–125 Ma

Extinct family of dinosaurs

Hypsilophodontidae (or Hypsilophodontia) is a traditionally used family of ornithopod dinosaurs, generally considered invalid today. It historically included many small bodied bipedal neornithischian taxa from around the world, and spanning from the Middle Jurassic until the Late Cretaceous. This inclusive status was supported by some phylogenetic analyses from the 1990s and mid 2000s, although there have also been many finding that the family is an unnatural grouping which should only include the type genus, Hypsilophodon, with the other genera being within clades like Thescelosauridae and Elasmaria. A 2014 analysis by Norman recovered a grouping of Hypsilophodon, Rhabdodontidae and Tenontosaurus, which he referred to as Hypsilophodontia. That clade is formally defined in the PhyloCode as "the smallest clade within Ornithopoda containing Hypsilophodon foxii and Tenontosaurus tilletti provided it does not include Iguanodon bernissartensis". All other analyses from around the same time have instead found these latter taxa to be within Iguanodontia. The family Hypsilophodontidae is formally defined in the PhyloCode by Daniel Madzia and colleagues in 2021 as "the largest clade containing Hypsilophodon foxii, but not Iguanodon bernissartensis and Rhabdodon priscus".

== Linnaean usage ==
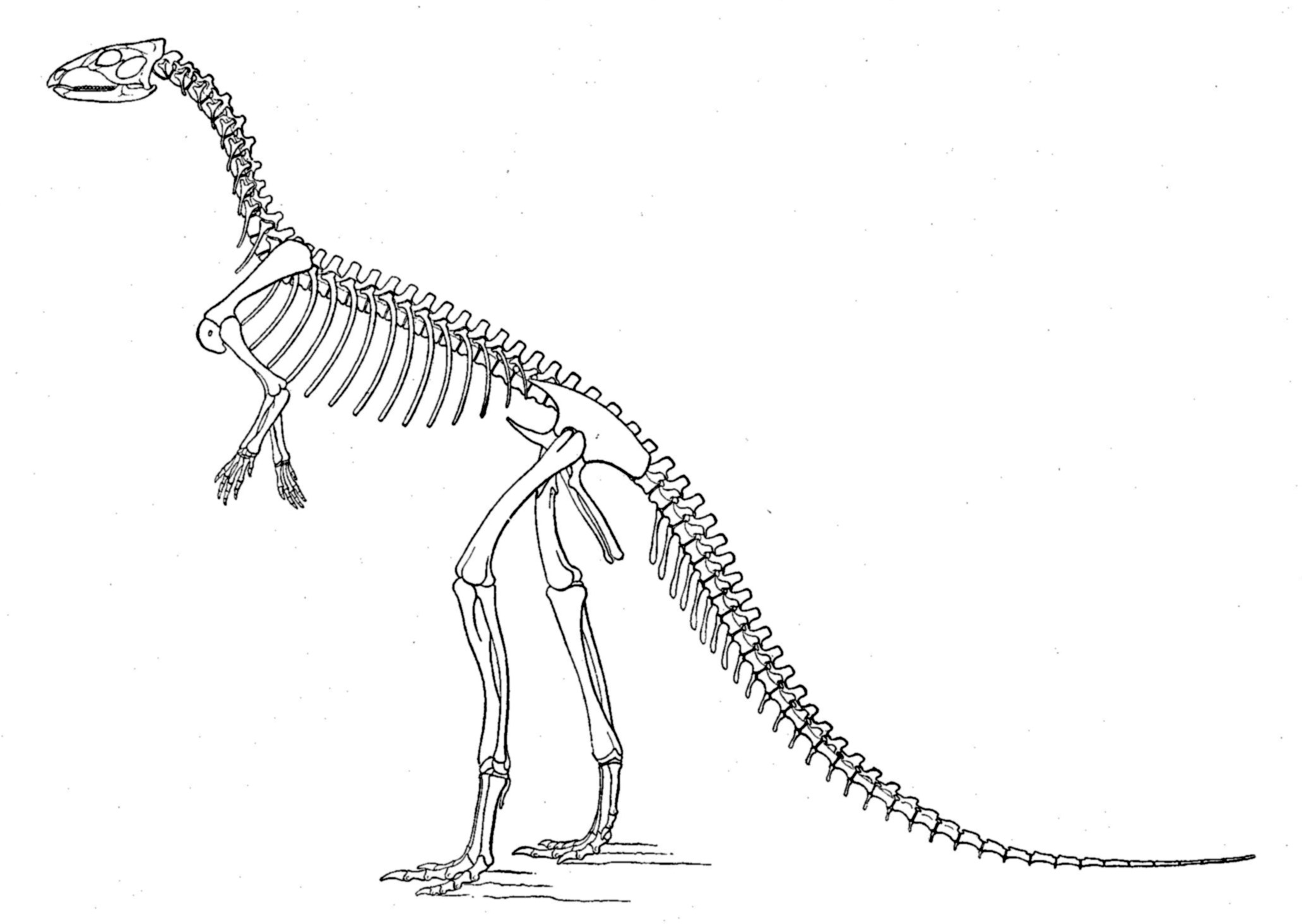
Skeleton of Laosaurus consors as drawn by Othniel Marsh (since named Othnielosaurus and later Nanosaurus)

Hypsilophodontidae was named originally in 1882 by Louis Dollo, as a family to include Hypsilophodon and other small ornithopods with a single row of teeth, four pedal digits, and a rhomboid sternum. For several decades after its naming the family only included Hypsilophodon. In 1911 Karl von Zittel published a textbook on vertebrate classifications, in which he included multiple genera in "Hypsilophodontidae" (sic for Hypsilophodontidae), including Hypsilophodon, Nanosaurus, Laosaurus and Dryosaurus. Zittel considered the family to unite all taxa that lacked premaxilla teeth, had a single row of maxilla teeth, neck vertebrae which have flat articulations or a flat front and round back, fused sacral vertebrae, a femur shorter than the tibia, 5 fingered manus' and 4 toed peds. Thescelosaurus was named in 1913 by Charles Gilmore, and its skeleton was described in detail by the same author in 1915. Gilmore had originally classified Thescelosaurus within Camptosauridae, but in the 1915 description he determined that it shared far more features with Hypsilophodontidae. He reclassified Laosaurus, Nanosaurus and Dryosaurus in the family Laosauridae, leaving only Thescelosaurus and Hypsilophodon in Hypsilophodontidae. The characteristics of the family were also re-analysed, and Gilmore showed that the premaxilla actually had teeth, a characteristic of the family; the 3rd manus digit had 4 phalanges; the femur was either shorter or longer than the tibia; and dorsal ribs had only a single articulation point.

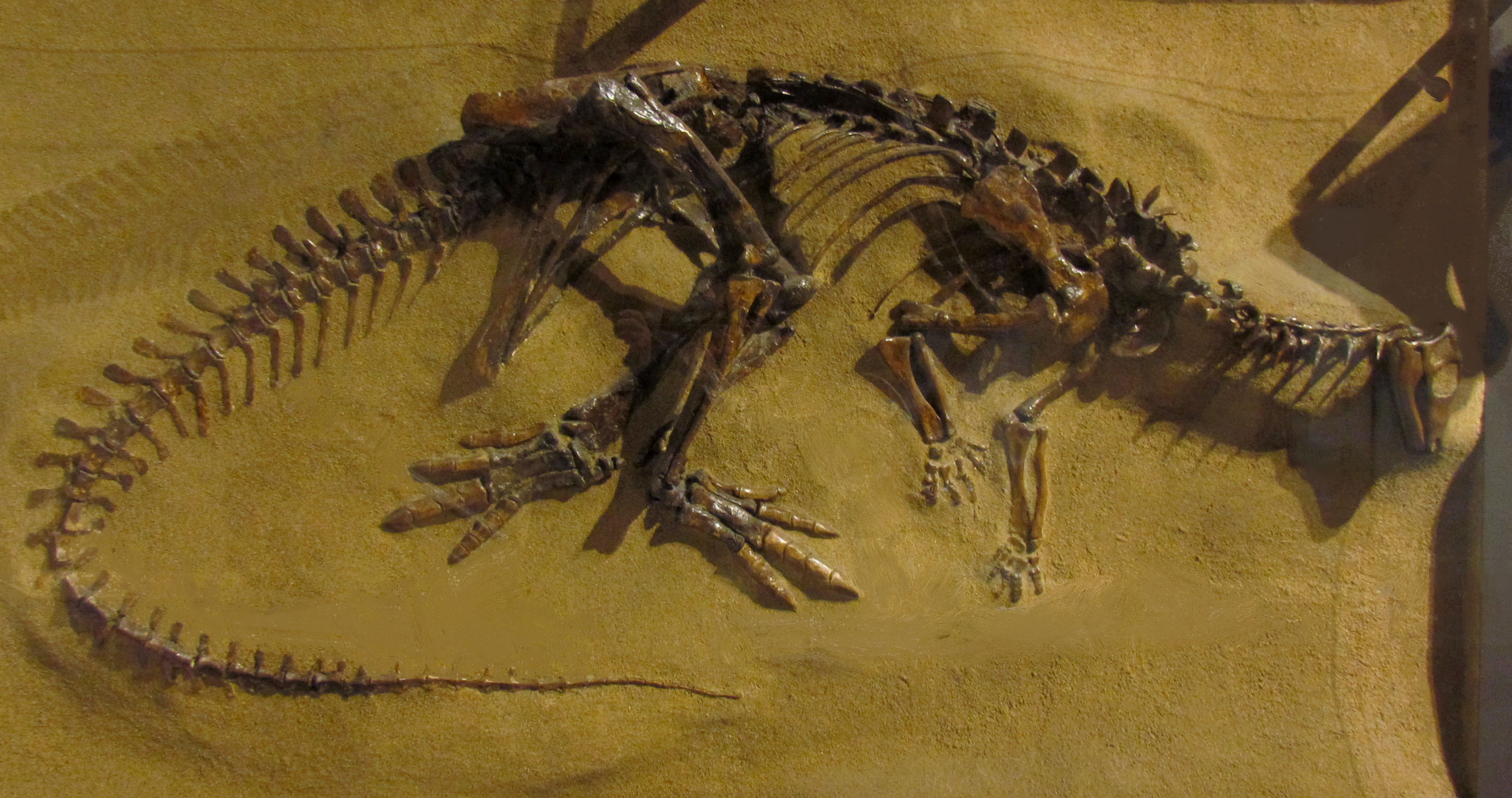
Skeleton of Thescelosaurus edmontonensis in display as preserved

The first expansive analysis on the relationships of Hypsilophodontidae was that of Swinton in 1936, during a redescription of Hypsilophodon from new specimens. The possible hypsilophodonts Geranosaurus and Stenopelix were removed from the clade (then the subfamily Hypsilophodontinae), and considered to be intermediate basal ornithopods, as there were no features linking them to Hypsilophodon. Thescelosaurus was considered within the family, because of the large number of shared features, as well as Dysalotosaurus, from the Kimmeridgian of Tanzania. Laosaurus and Dryosaurus were not considered hypsilophodonts because of their lack of distinguishable features, as Swinton concluded that they were probably in the family Laosauridae, intermediate between Hypsilophodontidae and Iguanodontidae, and were probably synonyms of each other as well. Charles M. Sternberg (1940) considered there to be multiple genera within the family, all sharing fully enamelled teeth, divided into two subfamilies, Hypsilophodontinae and Thescelosaurinae. Within Hypsilophodontinae–grouped by a longer scapula, thinner forelimb and femora shorter than tibiae–Sternberg included Hypsilophodon, Dysalotosaurus, and Parksosaurus (renaming of Thescelosaurus warreni). Only Thescelosaurus was included in Thescelosaurinae, as it had a tibia shorter than the femur.

Peter M. Galton in 1972 re-studied the relationships of taxa within Ornithischia. Thescelosaurus was removed from Hypsilophodontidae because of its short limbs, meaning it was probably not cursorial, unlike all other hypsilophodonts. The presence of premaxilla teeth, once used to diagnose the group, was found to be present in unrelated taxa like Heterodontosaurus, Protoceratops and Silvisaurus. Galton made Hypsilophodontidae paraphyletic, as he considered Thescelosaurus to be a hypsilophodont, but excluded it from the family Hypsilophodontidae. The phylogenetic hypothesis of Galton is shown below. Taxa considered hypsilophodontids are enclosed by green.

- Ornithischia
  - Fabrosaurus -> Echinodon
  - - Heterodontosaurus
    - Ankylosauria
    - Stegosauria
    - Pisanosaurus ->
      - - Hadrosauridae
        - Iguanodon -> Tenontosaurus
      - - - Ceratopsia
          - Stenopelix -> Psittacosaurus
        - - Camptosaurus leedsi -> Dysalotosaurus -> Dryosaurus -> Wealden ornithopod
          - - Camptosaurus
            - - Yaverlandia -> Stegoceras -> Pachycephalosaurus
              - - Laosaurus
                  - Parksosaurus
                  - Hypsilophodon
                    - Laosaurus minimus
                    - Thescelosaurus

== Cladistic usage ==
=== Question of monophyly ===
In 1992 David Weishampel and Ronald Heinrich reviewed the systematics and phylogenetics of Hypsilophodontidae. Hypsilophodontidae was supported as a monophyletic clade that encompassed "thescelosaurids", Hypsilophodon and Yandusaurus. The family was diagnosed by the absence of ridges that end as denticles in teeth (reversed in Hypsilophodon); presence of a single central ridge on dentary teeth; ossified sternal plates on torso ribs; and a straight and unexpanded shape of the prepubis. Their resulting cladogram is reproduced below:

- Euornithopoda
  - Iguanodontia
    - Tenontosaurus
    - - Dryosaurus
      - Camptosaurus
  - Hypsilophodontidae
    - Thescelosaurus
    - - - Yandusaurus
        - Othnielia
      - - - Parksosaurus
          - Hypsilophodon
        - - Zephyrosaurus
          - Orodromeus

The following cladogram of hypsilophodont relationships depicts the paraphyletic hypotheses; the "natural Hypsilophodontidae" hypothesis has been falling out of favor since the mid-late 1990s. It is after Brown et al. (2013), the most recent analysis of hypsilophodonts. Ornithischia, Ornithopoda, and Iguanodontia were not designated in their result, and so are left out here. Additional ornithopods beyond Tenontosaurus are omitted. Dinosaurs traditionally described as hypsilophodonts are found from Agilisaurus or Hexinlusaurus to Hypsilophodon or Gasparinisaura.

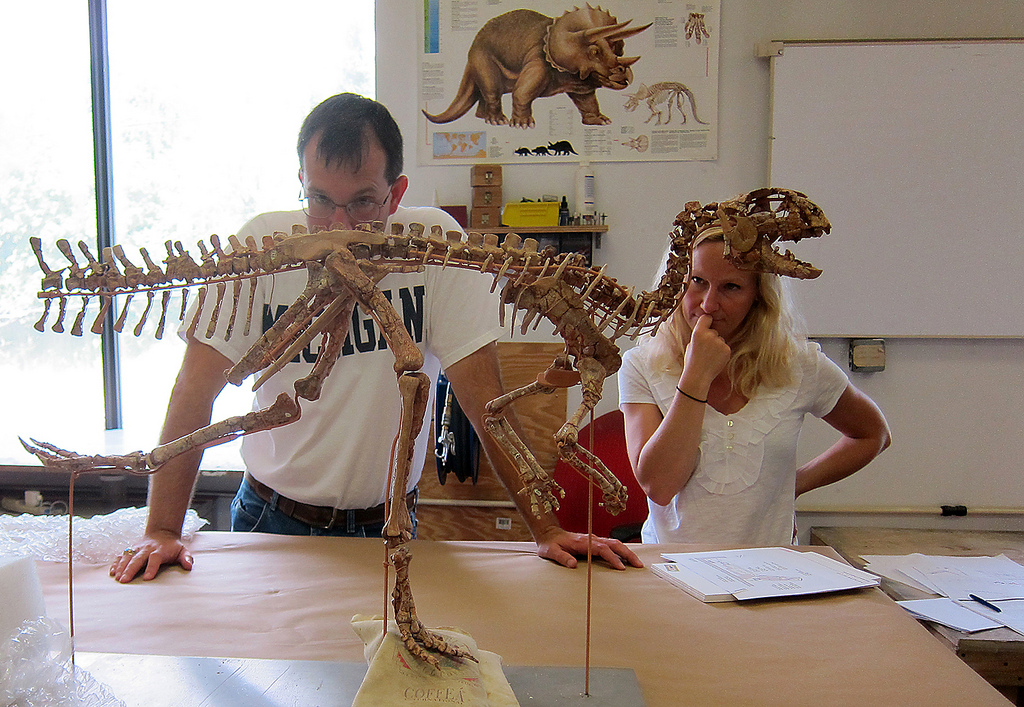
Skeleton of Convolosaurus (the Proctor Lake hypsilophodont)

- unnamed
  - Heterodontosaurus
  - - Scutellosaurus
    - - Lesothosaurus
      - - Agilisaurus
        - - Hexinlusaurus
          - - Othnielosaurus
            - - Thescelosauridae
                - Orodrominae
                  - - TMP 2008.045.0002
                    - Oryctodromeus
                  - - Albertadromeus
                    - Orodromeus
                    - Zephyrosaurus
                - Thescelosaurinae
                  - Parksosaurus
                  - - Changchunsaurus
                    - Haya
                    - Jeholosaurus
                    - - Thescelosaurus assiniboiensis
                      - Thescelosaurus neglectus
              - - Hypsilophodontidae
                  - Hypsilophodon
                - - Gasparinisaura
                  - - Tenontosaurus
                    - Other ornithopods

=== Modern usage ===
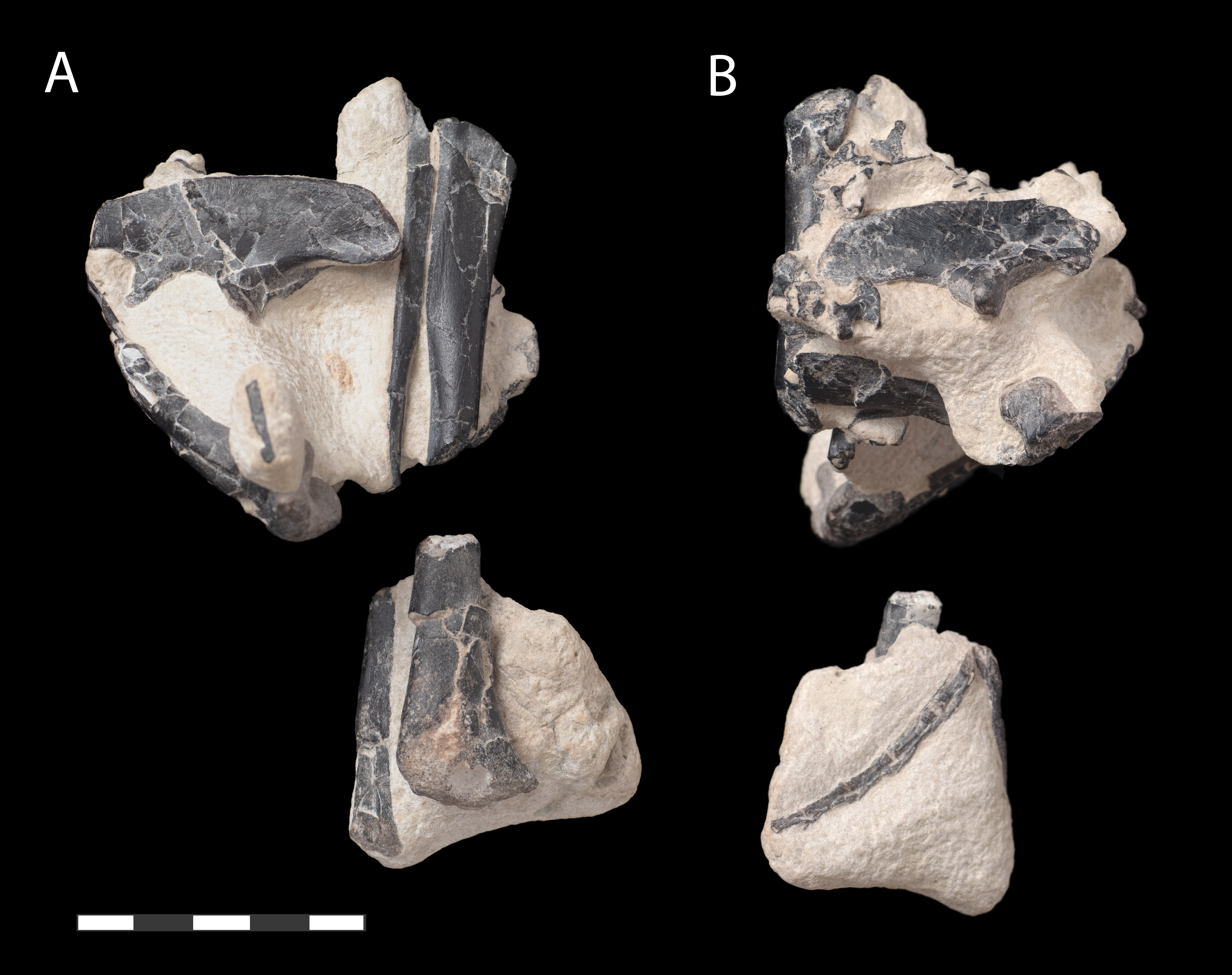
The holotype specimen of Vectidromeus, proposed by Longrich to be a hypsilophodontid

An alternate phylogeny, by Norman in 2014, resolved a monophyletic Hypsilophodontia (the family Hypsilophodontidae was not used because of its history), composed of Hypsilophodon grouped with Rhabdodontidae and Tenontosaurus. In one analysis in her 2022 review of iguanodontian phylogenetic relationships, Karen E. Poole recovered a large Hypsilophodontidae as the sister taxon of Iguanodontia, which consisted of several "traditional" hypsilophodontids, as well as Thescelosauridae.

In 2023, Longrich et al. described Vectidromeus as a new genus of hypsilophodontid. Although they did not perform a phylogenetic analysis, they suggested that, since other taxa previously assigned to Hypsilophodontidae had subsequently been moved to other groups, Vectidromeus and Hypsilophodon remained as the only members of the clade. A comprehensive phylogenetic framework focused on the evolution of early ornithischians published by Fonseca and colleagues in 2025 failed to recognize Vectidromeus as a close relative of Hypsilophodon, instead noting dryosaurid affinities for the taxon. As in previous proposals, the researchers' analyses recovered Hypsilophodontidae as the earliest-diverging clade within the Ornithopoda, as the sister taxon to Iguanodontia. It comprises two Barremian-aged European genera, Gideonmantellia and the eponymous Hypsilophodon.
