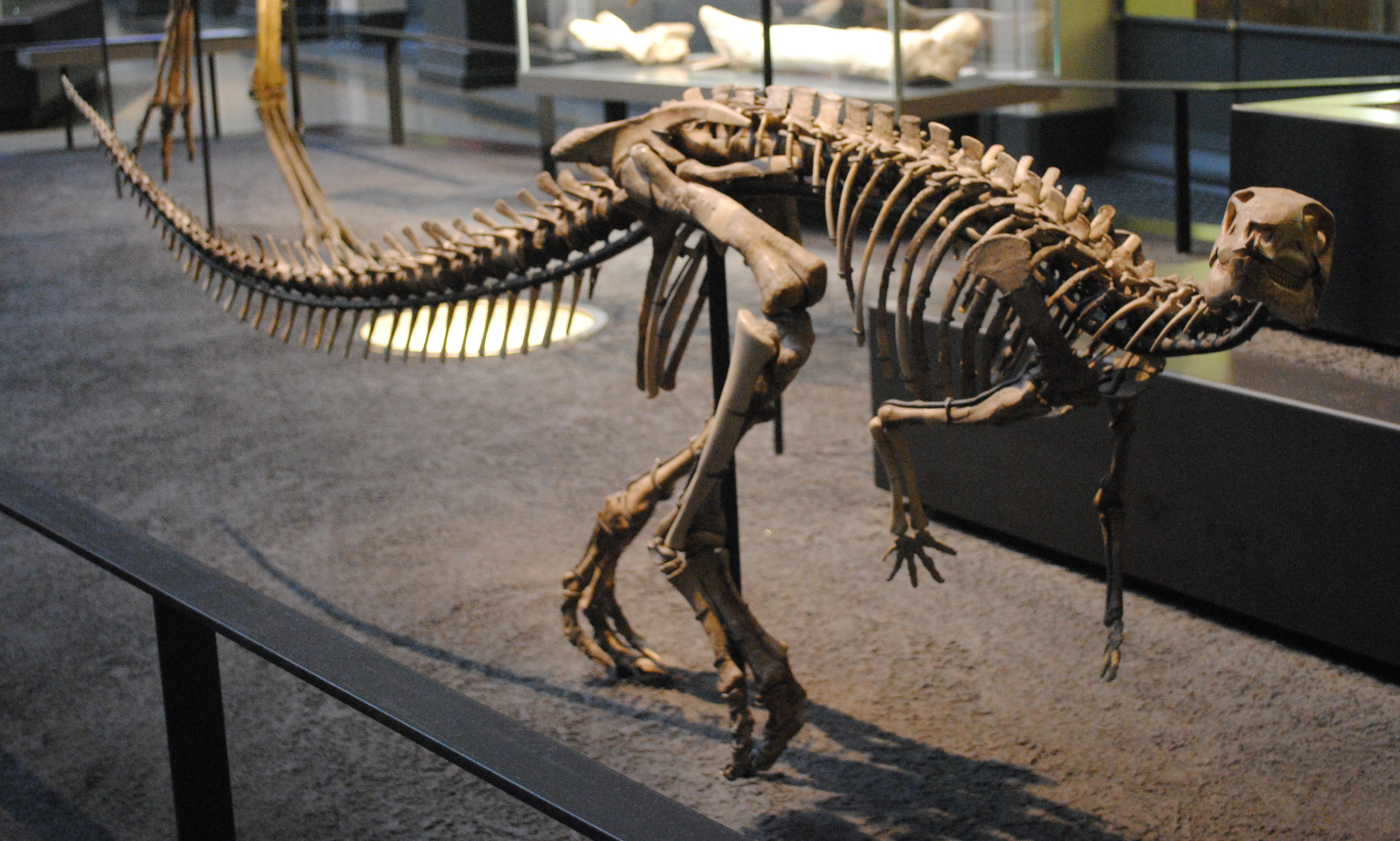
- Dysalotosaurus skeletal mount in Berlin

Scientific classification
- Kingdom: Animalia
- Phylum: Chordata
- Class: Reptilia
- Clade: Dinosauria
- Clade: †Ornithischia
- Clade: †Ornithopoda
- Clade: †Iguanodontia
- Clade: †Dryomorpha
- Family: †Dryosauridae; Milner & Norman, 1984

Subgroups
- †Callovosaurus?; †Dryosaurus; †Dysalotosaurus; †Elrhazosaurus; †Eousdryosaurus; †Iyuku?; †Valdosaurus; †Vectidromeus?; †Elasmaria?

= Dryosauridae =

Dryosauridae Temporal range: Middle Jurassic – Early Cretaceous, 164–115 Ma

Extinct family of dinosaurs

Dryosauridae is an extinct family of herbivorous bipedal ornithopod dinosaurs, first proposed by Milner & Norman in 1984. They are known from Middle Jurassic to Early Cretaceous rocks of Africa, Europe, and North America, with their fossil record possibly extending to South America, Australia and Antarctica and to the Late Cretaceous if elasmarians are included in the group.

Dryosauridae was first proposed in 1984 by British paleontologists Andrew R. Milner and David B. Norman, as a family to unite the early ornithopods Dryosaurus, Valdosaurus, and possibly Parksosaurus and Mochlodon. Milner and Norman separated these taxa from the family Hypsilophodontidae as they showed greater similarity with hadrosaurids and iguanodontids. The spelling had previously been used as a typographical error by Deraniyagala in 1939 for Dyrosauridae. Dryosaurids were cursorial animals adapted for running.

== Classification ==
Until recently, many dryosaurids have been regarded as dubious (Callovosaurus) or as species of the type member, Dryosaurus (Dysalotosaurus, Elrhazosaurus and Valdosaurus). However, more recent studies redescribe these genera as valid. Under the Phylocode, Madzia et al. (2021) formally defined Dryosauridae as "the largest clade containing Dryosaurus altus but not Iguanodon bernissartensis." The cladogram below follows their chosen reference phylogeny, taken from the description of Orthomerus dolloi.

- Iguanodontia
  - Rhabdodontidae
    - Rhabdodon spp.
    - - Zalmoxes robustus
      - - Mochlodon vorosi
        - Zalmoxes shqiperorum
  - - - Tenontosaurus tilletti
      - Tenontosaurus dossi
    - Dryomorpha
      - Ankylopollexia
      - Dryosauridae
        - Eousdryosaurus nanohallucis
        - "Camptosaurus" valdensis
        - Callovosaurus leedsi
        - Dysalotosaurus lettowvorbecki
        - Dryosaurus altus
        - - Valdosaurus canaliculatus
          - Elrhazosaurus nigeriensis
