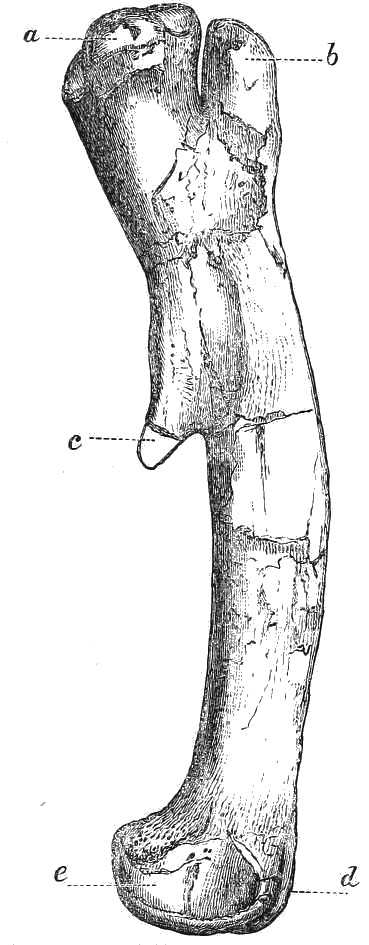
- Illustration of the holotype femur

Scientific classification
- Kingdom: Animalia
- Phylum: Chordata
- Class: Reptilia
- Clade: Dinosauria
- Clade: †Ornithischia
- Clade: †Ornithopoda
- Family: †Dryosauridae
- Genus: †Callovosaurus; Galton, 1980
- Species: †C. leedsi

Binomial name
- †Callovosaurus leedsi Galton, 1980 (Lydekker, 1889)

Synonyms
- Camptosaurus leedsi Lydekker, 1889

= Callovosaurus =

Callovosaurus Temporal range: Callovian ~164 Ma

Extinct genus of dinosaurs

Callovosaurus (meaning "Callovian lizard") is a genus of iguanodontian dinosaur known from most of a left thigh bone discovered in Middle Jurassic-age rocks of England. At times, it has been considered dubious or a valid genus of basal iguanodontian, perhaps a dryosaurid.

== History and description ==
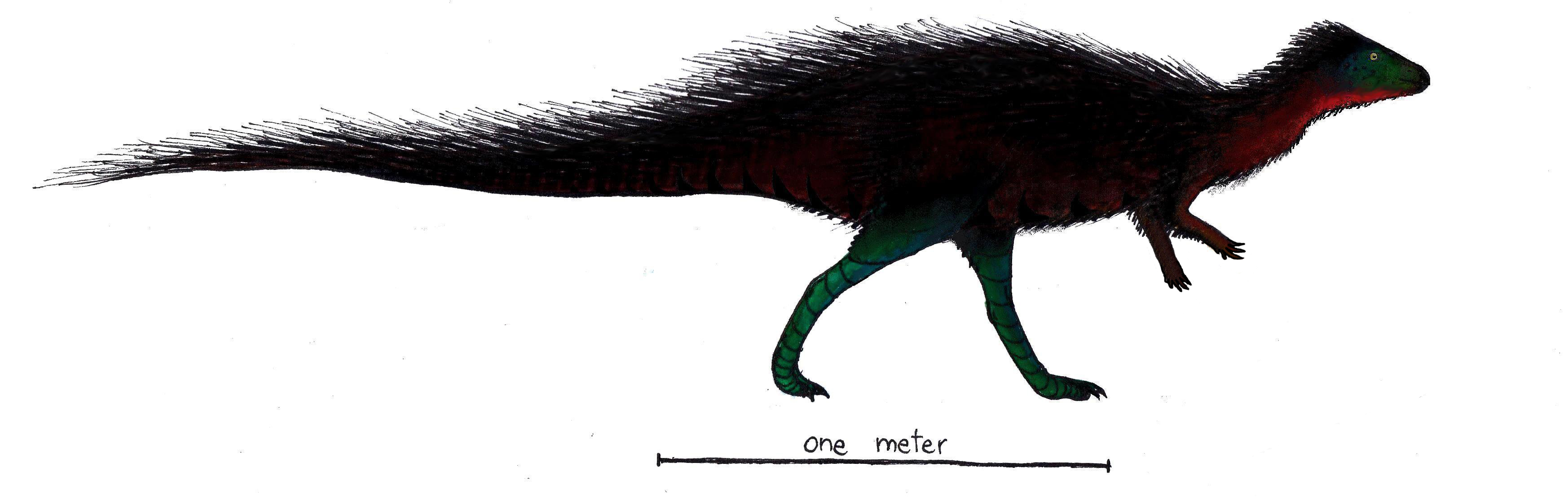
Life restoration

Callovosaurus is based on NHMUK PV R 1993, a nearly complete left thigh bone. This specimen was collected from the middle Callovian–age (Middle Jurassic) Peterborough Member (former Lower Oxford Clay) of the Oxford Clay Formation of Fletton, near Peterborough in Cambridgeshire, England. The bone is 28 centimetres (0.92 ft) long, and is estimated to have belonged to an animal approximately 2.5 m (8.2 ft) in length. A partial shin bone from the same site or nearby, SMC J.46889, may also belong to Callovosaurus.

The type species, C. leedsi, was first described by Richard Lydekker in 1889 as Camptosaurus leedsi, the specific name honouring collector Alfred Nicholson Leeds. Aside from Charles W. Gilmore suggesting in 1909 that it was probably more closely related to Dryosaurus than to Camptosaurus, Camptosaurus leedsi attracted little attention for decades until it was reviewed by Peter Galton. First noting its distinctiveness in a review of English hypsilophodontids, he then gave the species the new genus Callovosaurus in 1980, which he placed in Camptosauridae. While considered a dubious iguanodontian in several reviews, which refer to it as "Camptosaurus" leedsi, Jose Ignacio Ruiz-Omeñaca and coauthors have proposed that Callovosaurus is a valid genus, and the oldest known dryosaurid. Though a study published in 2025 from Łukasz Czepiński & Daniel Madzia found Callovosaurus to be more basal than once thought and found Callovosaurus outside of the family Dryosauridae and Dryomorpha as a whole.

== Palaeoecology ==
Callovosaurus was found in the lower Oxford Clay, which has yielded a diverse reptile assemblage: ichthyosaurs, plesiosaurs, crocodyliforms, pterosaurs, sauropod dinosaurs, the stegosaurids Loricatosaurus and Lexovisaurus, and the armoured dinosaur Sarcolestes. These rocks were once thought to be somewhat younger, from the Oxfordian of the Late Jurassic, but they are now known to be middle Callovian in age.

The diet of Callovosaurus, like that of other iguanodontians, was plant material. It is one of the earliest known members of the iguanodontian lineage.
