= Bone Cabin Quarry =

Dinosaur quarry in Wyoming, U.S.

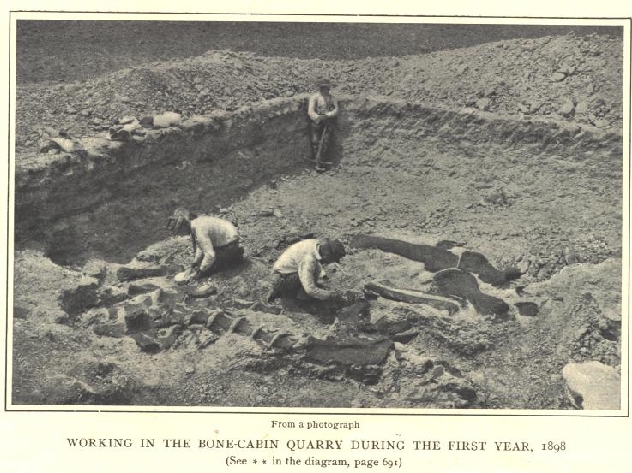
- Bone Cabin Quarry in its first year of excavation, 1898

- Location in Wyoming Location in United States
- Location: Wyoming, U.S.; 41°58′02″N 106°17′28″W

Bone Cabin Quarry is a dinosaur quarry that lay approximately 55 miles (89 km) northwest of Laramie, Wyoming, near historic Como Bluff. During the summer of 1897 Walter Granger, a paleontologist from the American Museum of Natural History, came upon a hillside littered with Jurassic period dinosaur bone fragments. Nearby was a sheepherder cabin built entirely out of fossil bones, hence the name "Bone Cabin Quarry." After Granger's discovery in late August 1897, the quarry was kept secret until early 1898, when the manpower could be amassed to undertake a full-scale excavation. Henry Fairfield Osborn, curator of the American Museum of Natural History headed the expedition. The bones of perfect skeletons lay thickly crowded. As of 1905, 483 parts of dinosaur were found, packed in 275 boxes with a weight of 100,000 pounds (45,000 kg). The excavation area was only 7,500 square feet (700 m^{2}). Bone Cabin Quarry was excavated from 1898 until 1905, when the productivity of specimens thinned. The American Museum of Natural History's 1898 field report records that a rich strike was made at the quarry on June 12, 1898, and that the expedition remained at the locality until October 1. Some of the dinosaurs found at the Bone Cabin Quarry include Stegosaurus, Allosaurus and Apatosaurus. Gargoyleosaurus is also known from the Bone Cabin Quarry West locality.

The Ornithopod Species Dryosaurus altus is also present in the Bone Cabin Quarry. The quarry is also the type locality of the theropod dinosaur Ornitholestes hermanni, which was described by Henry Fairfield Osborn in 1903. The holotype is a partial skeleton including parts of the skull, jaws, vertebral column, pelvis, and limbs. Bone Cabin Quarry has also produced the pterosaur Harpactognathus gentryii. In 2025, a large, three-dimensionally preserved humerus from the quarry was described and tentatively referred to this species. The specimen is among the largest Jurassic pterosaur humeri known.

From the Annual Field Report of the American Museum of Natural History, 1898:

On June 12th a rich strike was made in opening "Bone Cabin Quarry". This is where the larger part of the year's collection was secured. The work was arduous and additional help was needed. P. Kaisen was engaged at the end of June. The party stayed here until the close of the field season on October 1st.

About 5 miles (8.0 km) southwest of Bone Cabin Quarry, a further quarry, called Nine Mile Quarry, was opened up in June 1899, near Nine Mile Crossing of Little Medicine Bow River. An incomplete Brontosaurus skeleton was recovered.

== See also ==
- List of fossil sites (with link directory)
