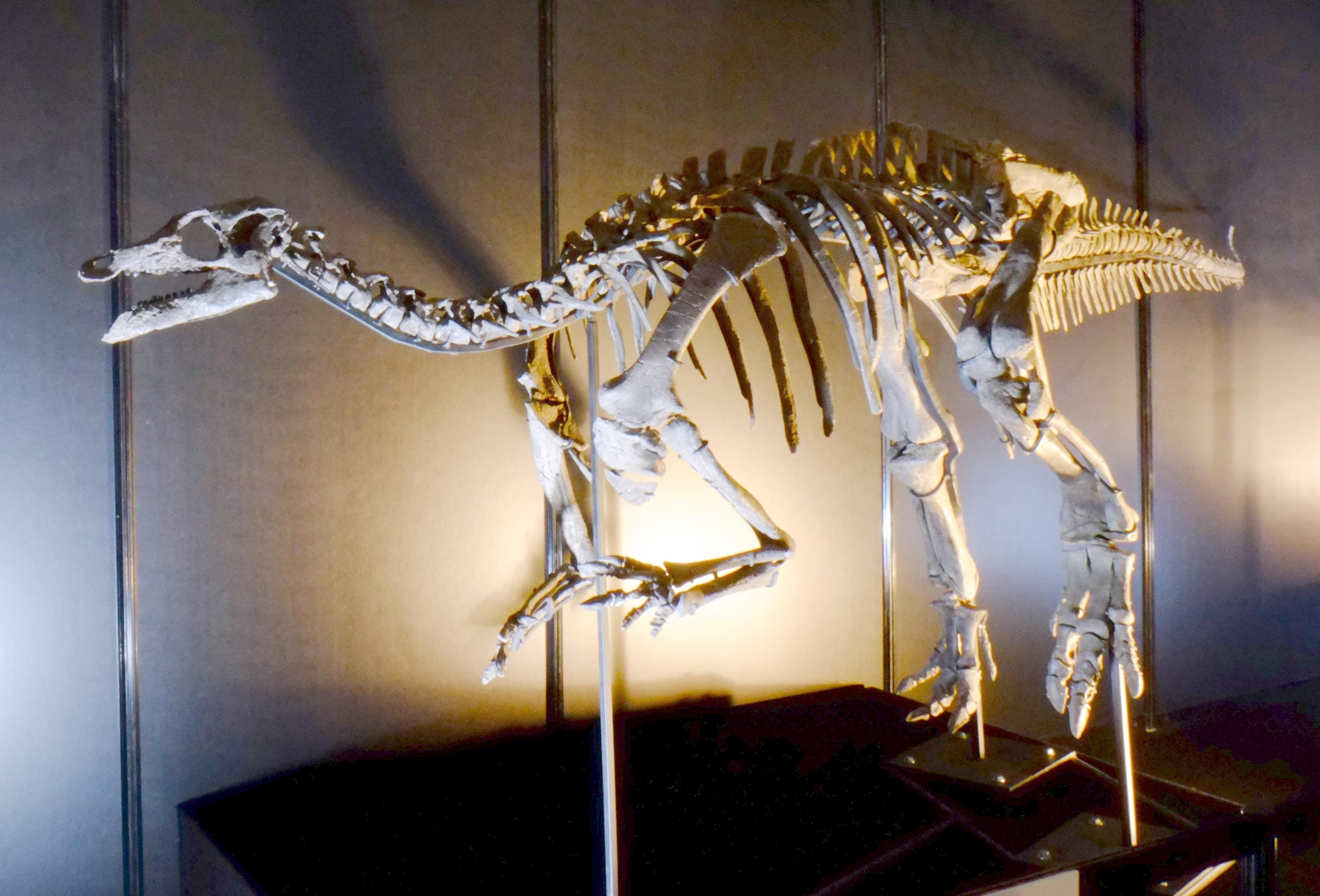
- Reconstructed skeleton in Japan

Scientific classification
- Kingdom: Animalia
- Phylum: Chordata
- Class: Reptilia
- Clade: Dinosauria
- Clade: †Ornithischia
- Clade: †Ornithopoda
- Clade: †Dryomorpha
- Clade: †Ankylopollexia
- Superfamily: †Camptosauroidea; Marsh, 1885
- Family: †Camptosauridae; Marsh, 1885
- Genus: †Camptosaurus; Marsh, 1885

Type species
- Camptonotus dispar Marsh, 1879

Other species
- †C. aphanoecetes? Carpenter & Wilson, 2008; †C. prestwichii? Hulke, 1880 [originally Iguanodon prestwichii]

Synonyms
- Brachyrophus Cope, 1878; Camptonotus Marsh, 1879 (preoccupied); Cumnoria? Seeley, 1888; Symphyrophus Cope, 1878; Uteodon? McDonald, 2011

= Camptosaurus =

Camptosaurus Temporal range: Late Jurassic, 156.3–146.8 Ma

Extinct genus of dinosaurs

Camptosaurus (/ˌkæmptəˈsɔːrəs/ KAMP-tə-SOR-əs) is an extinct genus of plant-eating, beaked ornithischian dinosaurs of the Late Jurassic period of western North America and possibly also Europe. The name means 'flexible lizard' (Greek καμπτος (kamptos) meaning 'bent' and σαυρος (sauros) meaning 'lizard').

== History of discovery ==
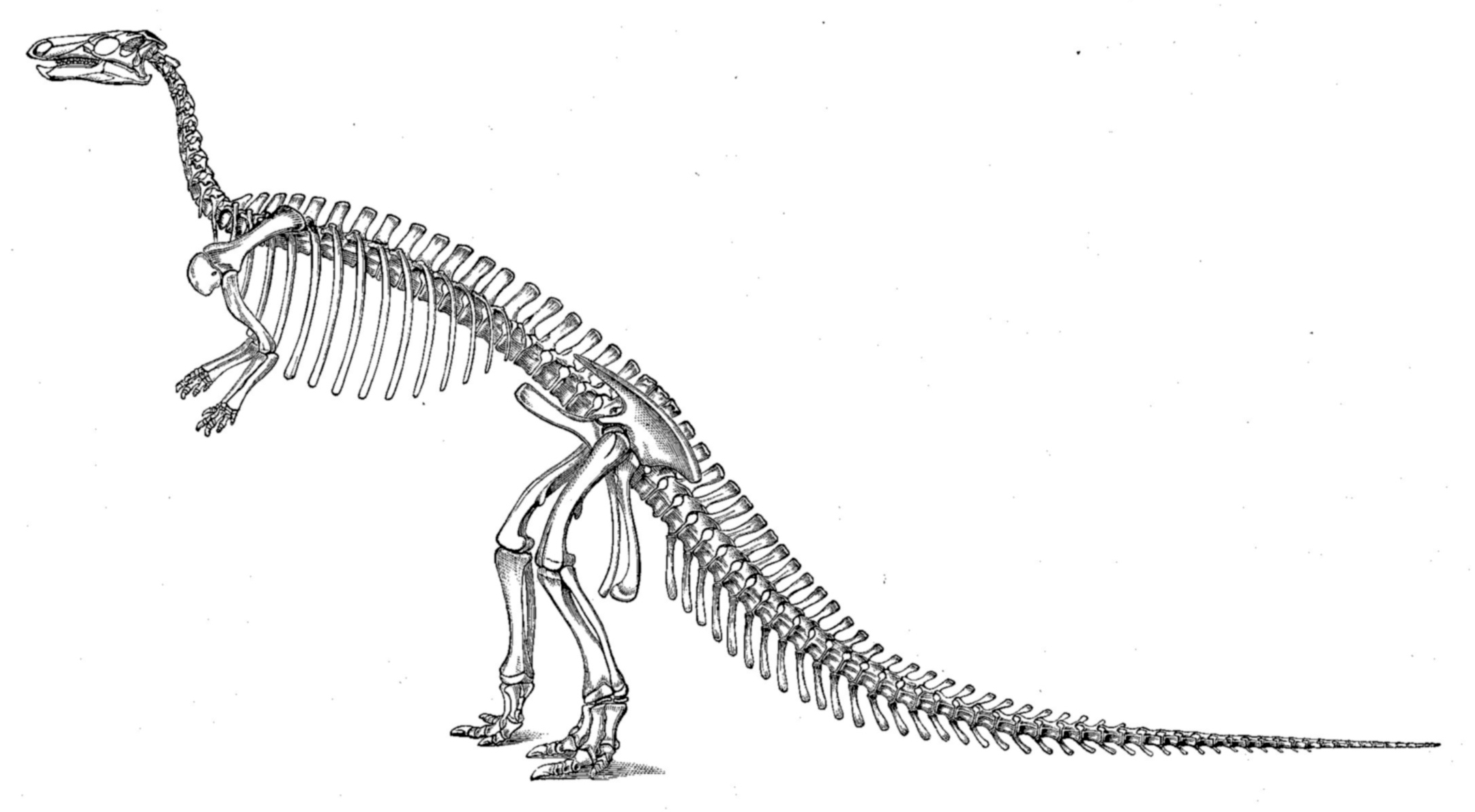
Historical skeletal restoration by O.C. Marsh, with skull based on remains now referred to Theiophytalia

On September 4, 1879 William Harlow Reed in Albany County, Wyoming found the remains of a small euornithopod. That same year Professor Othniel Charles Marsh described and named the find as Camptonotus, or "flexible back", from Greek κάμπτω, "to bend" and νῶτον, "back", in reference to the presumed flexibility of the sacral vertebrae. The holotype was YPM 1877, a partial skeleton. The genus was renamed Camptosaurus by him in 1885 because the original name was already in use for a cricket. In 1879, Marsh named C. dispar (type species of the genus) for material he received from his collectors at Quarry 13 near Como Bluff, Wyoming in the Morrison Formation and C. amplus based on the holotype YPM 1879, a foot found by Arthur Lakes at Quarry 1A. The foot was later shown to have belonged to Allosaurus. Throughout the 1880 and 1890s, he continued to receive specimens from Quarry 13 and in 1894 named two additional species: C. medius and C. nanus, based in part on size. Charles W. Gilmore named two additional species, C. browni and C. depressus in his 1909 redescription of the Marsh specimens. In the Morrison Formation, Camptosaurus fossils are present in stratigraphic zones 2–6.

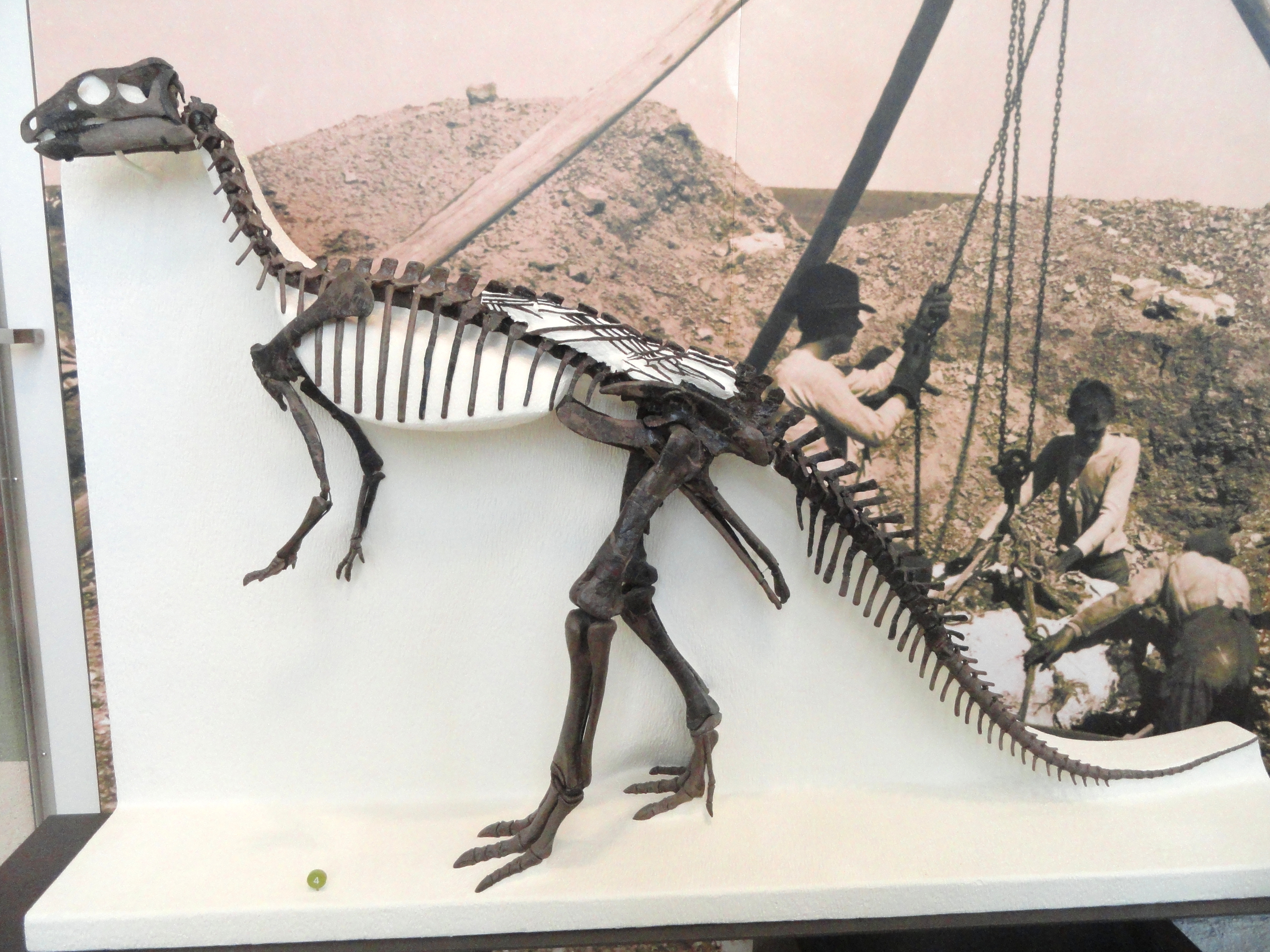
Outdated mount of a C. nanus skeleton at the AMNH, now thought to be a growth stage of C. dispar

Then in 1980, Peter Galton and H.P. Powell in their redescription of C. prestwichi (see following), considered C. nanus, C. medius and C. browni to be different growth stages or different gender of the larger C. dispar, and therefore only C. dispar was a valid species. They also considered a skull, YPM 1887, in 1886 referred to C. amplus by Marsh, later confirmed by Gilmore, to belong to C. dispar as well. Gilmore had used this skull to describe the skull of Camptosaurus, but the specimen was recently shown by Brill and Carpenter not to belong to Camptosaurus. In 2007, they put it into its own genus and species, Theiophytalia kerri.

Camptosaurus depressus was recovered from the Lakota Formation near the town of Hot Springs, South Dakota. It was described by Charles Gilmore in 1909 based on the holotype and only known specimen USNM 4753, a fragmentary postcranium, by the "narrowness or depressed nature of the ilia". Carpenter and Wilson (2008) referred this species to Planicoxa, as P. depressa, on the basis of similarities between its ilium and the holotype ilium of Planicoxa venenica. However, McDonald and colleagues (2010), and McDonald (2011) found that the horizontal postacetabular process of C. depressus is more likely a product of distortion. Therefore, McDonald put it into its own genus, Osmakasaurus. An additional species, Camptosaurus aphanoecetes, was named by Carpenter and Wilson in 2008 for specimens from Dinosaur National Monument. It differs from C. dispar in the lower jaw, shorter neck vertebrae, and straighter ischium ending in a small "foot" among other features. An analysis by Andrew McDonald and colleagues in 2010 suggested that like C. aphanoecetes is actually more closely related to more advanced iguanodonts (Styracosterna). It has been moved to the new genus Uteodon.

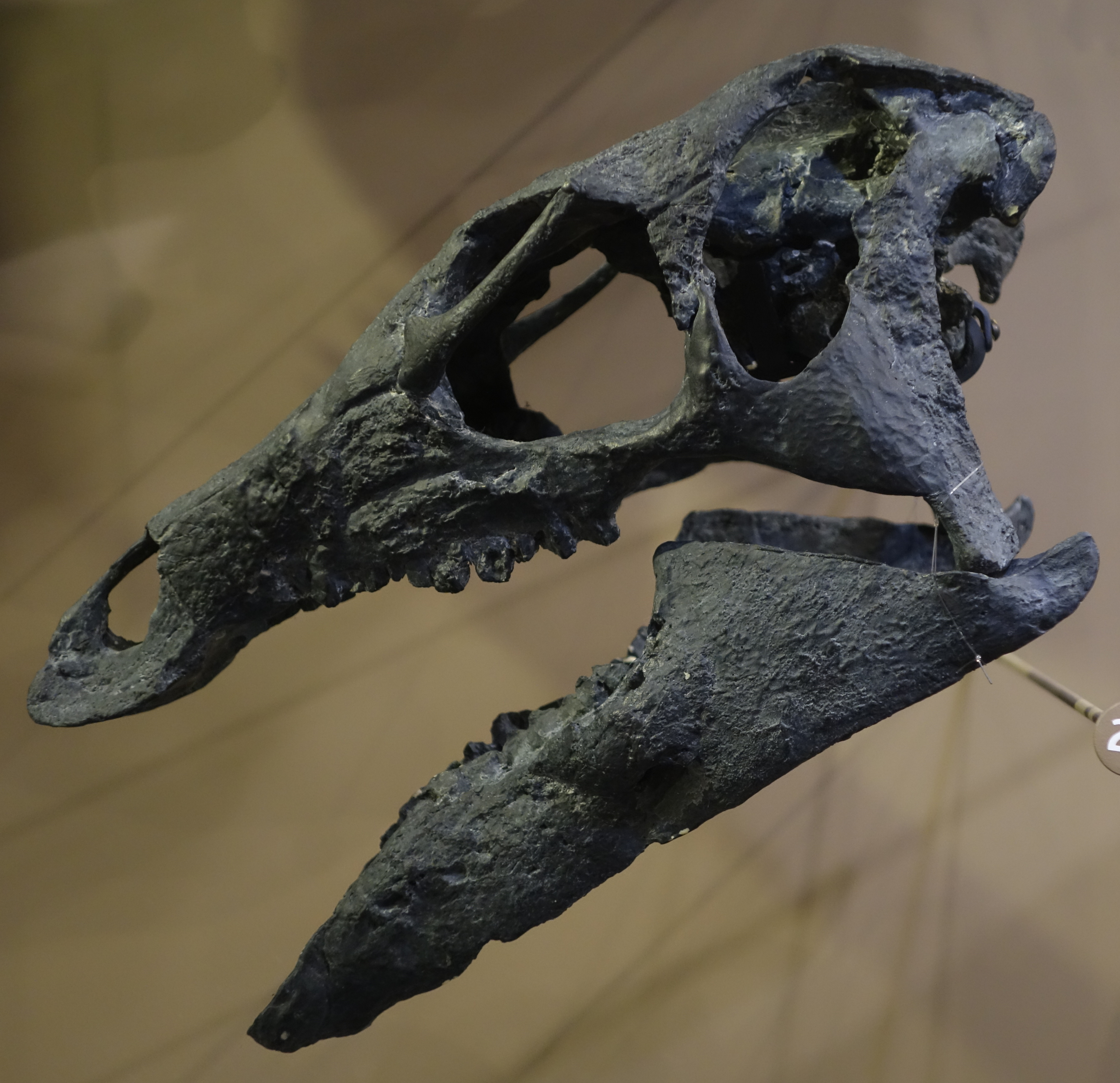
Cast of a skull from Bone Cabin Quarry West, Wyoming

While Marsh was describing Camptosaurus species in North America, numerous species from Europe were also referred to the genus in the late 19th and early 20th centuries: C. inkeyi, C. hoggii, C. leedsi, C. prestwichi, and C. valdensis. C. inkeyi (Nopcsa, 1900) consists of fragmentary material, a dentary and articular from Upper Cretaceous rocks of the Haţeg Basin in Romania. It is almost certainly a rhabdodontid and is no longer considered valid (nomen dubium). C. valdensis consists of the holotype and only known specimen NHMUK R167, a poorly preserved left femur lacking the distal end. It was earlier believed to be a dubious dryosaurid, but a more recent analysis contends that the diagnostic features of Dryosauridae do not overlap with its material, instead considering it an iguanodontian. C. leedsi is probably a valid dryosaurid that has been moved to the new genus Callovosaurus. C. hoggii was originally named Iguanodon hoggii by Richard Owen in 1874 and was moved to Camptosaurus by Norman and Barrett in 2002. It has since been transferred to the genus Owenodon.

The remaining European species Camptosaurus prestwichii was recovered from Chawley Brick Pits, Cumnor Hurst in Oxfordshire in England. The fossil was found when a tramway was driven into the side of a hill. It was described by Hulke in 1880 as Iguanodon prestwichii, and then placed in its own genus Cumnoria by Seeley in 1888, but was soon sunk into Camptosaurus by Lydekker in 1889. However, Naish & Martill (2008), McDonald and colleagues (2010), and McDonald (2011) found that Seeley's original generic distinction was valid. Cumnoria has been recovered as a styracosternan, more closely related to advanced iguanodonts than to Camptosaurus dispar, similar to the case of Uteodon.

In 2022, the first confirmed European remains belonging to aff. Camptosaurus .sp were described by Sánchez-Fenollosa et al.. A single specimen was found in the Fuentecillas member of the Villar del Arzobispo Formation in Spain, consisting of an anterior cervical centrum; an anterior dorsal centrum; a dorsosacral centrum; four sacral centra; a caudosacral centrum; two anterior caudal centra; three medial caudal centra; and a distal fragment from the left humerus. The Fuentecillas specimen is seen to be closer to Camptosaurus than to Draconyx from the Jurassic of Portugal, hence its tentative placement within the Camptosaurus genus.

== Description ==
Size of C. dispar compared in size to a human

Camptosaurus is a relatively heavily built form, with robust hindlimbs and broad feet, still having four toes. Due to the separate status of Uteodon it has become problematic which material from the Morrison Formation belongs to Camptosaurus. The specimens with certainty belonging to Camptosaurus dispar, from Quarry 13, have been recovered from very deep layers, probably dating to the Callovian-Oxfordian. The largest fragments from later strata indicate adult individuals around 6.79 metres (22.3 ft) long. The Quarry 13 individuals are smaller though. It is estimated that Camptosaurus typically reached 5–6 metres (16–20 ft) long and weighed 500–1,000 kilograms (1,100–2,200 lb).

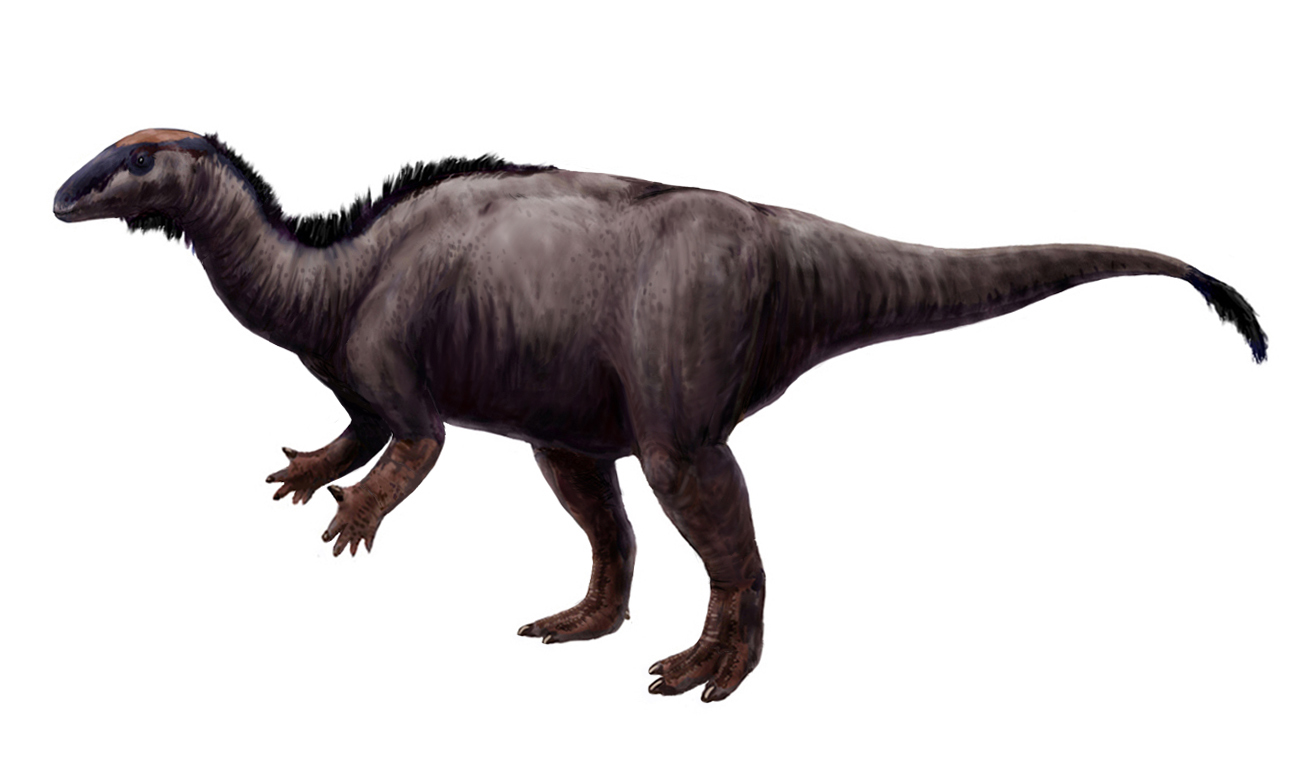
Life restoration of C. dispar

Earlier reconstructions, such as those by Marsh and Gilmore, were based on the skull of Theiophytalia and display an incorrect, more rectangular profile. The skull was in fact triangular with a pointed snout, equipped with a beak. Its teeth were more tightly packed in the jaw compared to other Morrison euornithopods. Museum curator John Foster describes them as having "thick median ridges on their lateral sides and denticles along their edges," these features were similar to, but "more fully developed" than those in Dryosaurus. Camptosaurus teeth frequently exhibit extensive wear, which indicates that individuals in the genus had a diet of relatively tough vegetation.

== Classification ==
Marsh in 1885 assigned Camptosaurus to a family of its own: the Camptosauridae. Alternatively some authors considered it an early member of the Iguanodontidae.

Modern phylogenetics has made Camptosaurus by definition part of the clade Ankylopollexia, of which group it would then be a basal member. This would mean that the genus is closely related to the ancestor of later iguanodontid and hadrosaurid dinosaurs and was more derived than contemporaries such as Dryosaurus and Nanosaurus.

In the 2010 and 2011 cladistic analyses of McDonald and colleagues, Camptosaurus was placed as follows:

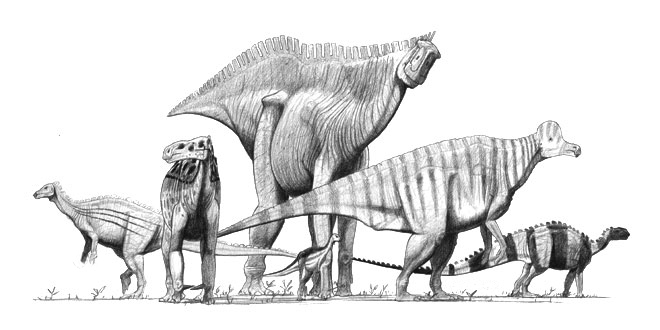
Restoration of six ornithopod dinosaurs, including Camptosaurus at the far left

- Ankylopollexia
  - Camptosaurus
  - Styracosterna
    - Uteodon
    - - - Hippodraco
        - Theiophytalia
      - - Iguanacolossus
        - - Lanzhousaurus
          - - Kukufeldia
            - - Barilium
              - Hadrosauriformes

== Paleobiology ==
Paleoenvironment and dinosaurs of the Morrison Formation, with two C. aphanoecetes at middle left

Based on studies of other iguanodonts (clade Iguanodontia), scientists believe they may have been able to achieve running speeds of 25 km per hour (15 mph). A tiny 9 inch fossilized embryo, referred to Camptosaurus, was retrieved from Morrison Formation strata at Dinosaur National Monument in Utah.

== See also ==
- List of dinosaurs
- Paleobiota of the Morrison Formation
