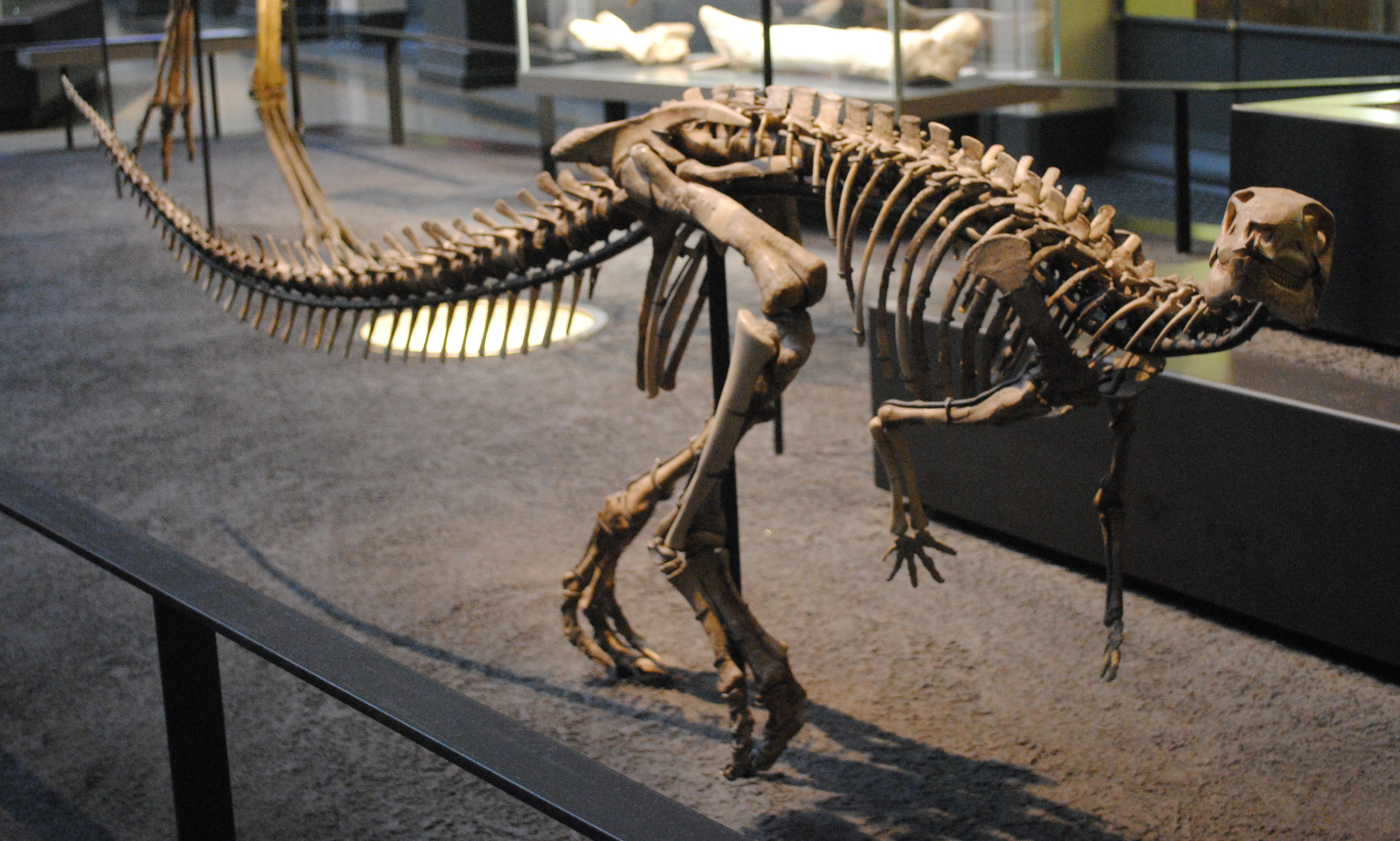
- D. lettowvorbecki skeleton in Berlin

Scientific classification
- Kingdom: Animalia
- Phylum: Chordata
- Clade: Dinosauria
- Clade: †Ornithischia
- Clade: †Ornithopoda
- Clade: †Dryomorpha
- Family: †Dryosauridae
- Genus: †Dysalotosaurus; Virchow, 1919
- Species: †D. lettowvorbecki

Binomial name
- †Dysalotosaurus lettowvorbecki Virchow, 1919

= Dysalotosaurus =

Dysalotosaurus Temporal range: Late Jurassic, 152–151 Ma

Extinct genus of dinosaurs

Dysalotosaurus ("uncatchable lizard") is a genus of herbivorous iguanodontian dinosaur. It was a dryosaurid iguanodontian, and its fossils have been found in late Kimmeridgian-age rocks (Late Jurassic) of the Tendaguru Formation of Lindi Region in Tanzania. The type and only species of the genus is D. lettowvorbecki. This species was named by Hans Virchow in 1919 in honor of the Imperial German Army Officer, Paul von Lettow-Vorbeck. For much of the 20th century the species was referred to the related and approximately contemporary genus Dryosaurus, but newer studies reject this synonymy.

== Discovery and naming ==
Thousands of Dysalotosaurus bones and bone fragments have been recovered from the Tendaguru Formation in Tanzania, Africa since 1909; the specimens described by Hans Virchow (1919) were discovered between 1909 and 1913. It has been suggested that all of these specimens were part of a herd that was killed in a mass death event. The genus was named by Hans Virchow in 1919, as opposed to Josef Felix Pompeckj (1920), who is often incorrectly cited as naming the genus.

== Description ==
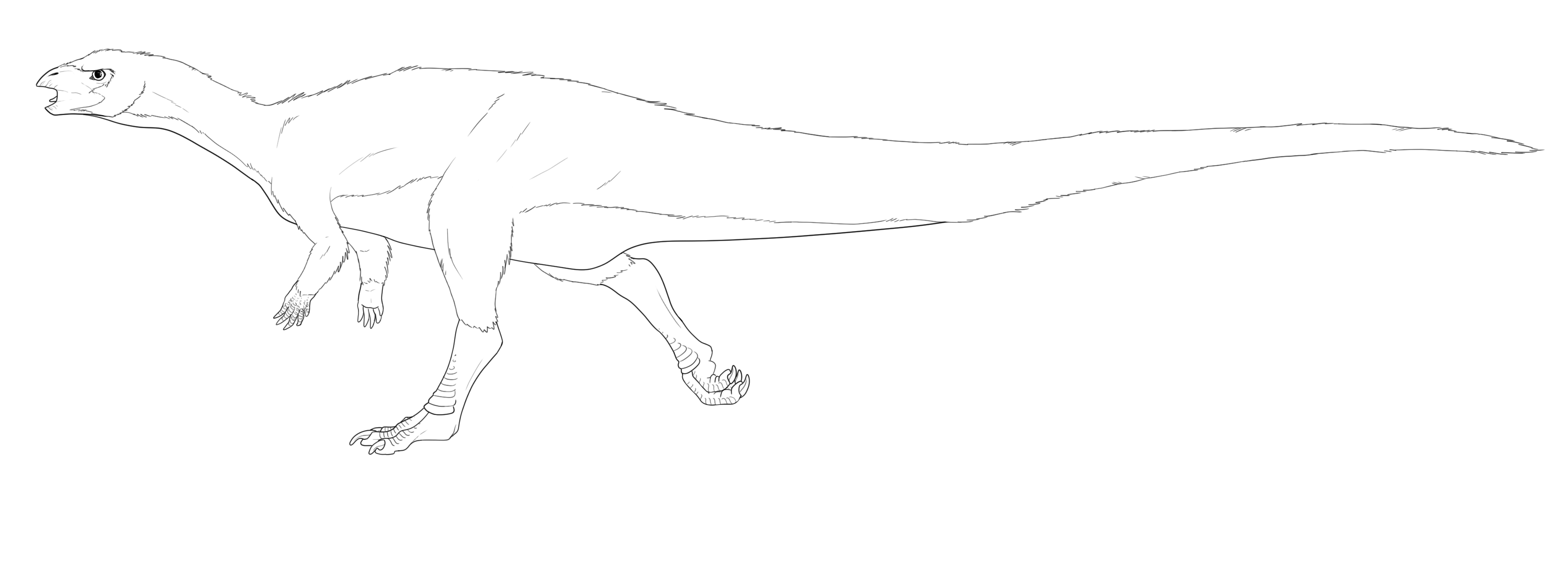
Illustration of Dysalotosaurus

Dysalotosaurus was a small, relatively basal iguanodontian ornithopod. It lacked the large thumb spikes found in later iguanodontians, and was more adapted for bipedalism than its larger relatives with its short front limbs and long, counter-balancing tail. Dysalotosaurus had powerful and long hind limbs, suggesting it was relatively cursorial compared to Iguanodon and other members of the clade. A recent comparative study based on bone cross-sectional geometry confirmed its bipedal locomotion with erect stance.

Based on CT scans of the braincase, it is believed that Dysalotosaurus held its head dorsally (pointing straight forward) when not feeding. The same study also suggested, based on the morphology of the inner ear, that Dysalotosaurus was not able to discern between high- and low-frequency sounds (like most herbivorous dinosaurs). However, it also had other adaptations that are commonly associated with derived hearing abilities, rendering its sensory capabilities unclear.

In 2016, Gregory S. Paul estimated Dysalotosaurus' length at 2.5 metres (8.2 ft), and its weight at 80 kilograms (180 lb).

=== Ontogeny ===
Various specimens of Dysalotosaurus are known, all representing animals that were not yet sexually mature at the time of their deaths. Ontogenetic studies demonstrate typical aging trends, such as a lengthening of the snout and relative shrinking of the orbit. Differences in dentition as the animals aged also suggest a change from an omnivorous diet early in life to fully herbivorous feeding habits as an adult. This switch reflects the general evolutionary trend towards obligate herbivory among iguanodontians and other ornithopods.

Dysalotosaurus also appears to have had a life expectancy of roughly twenty years and lived in herds of mixed ages.

== Palaeobiology ==
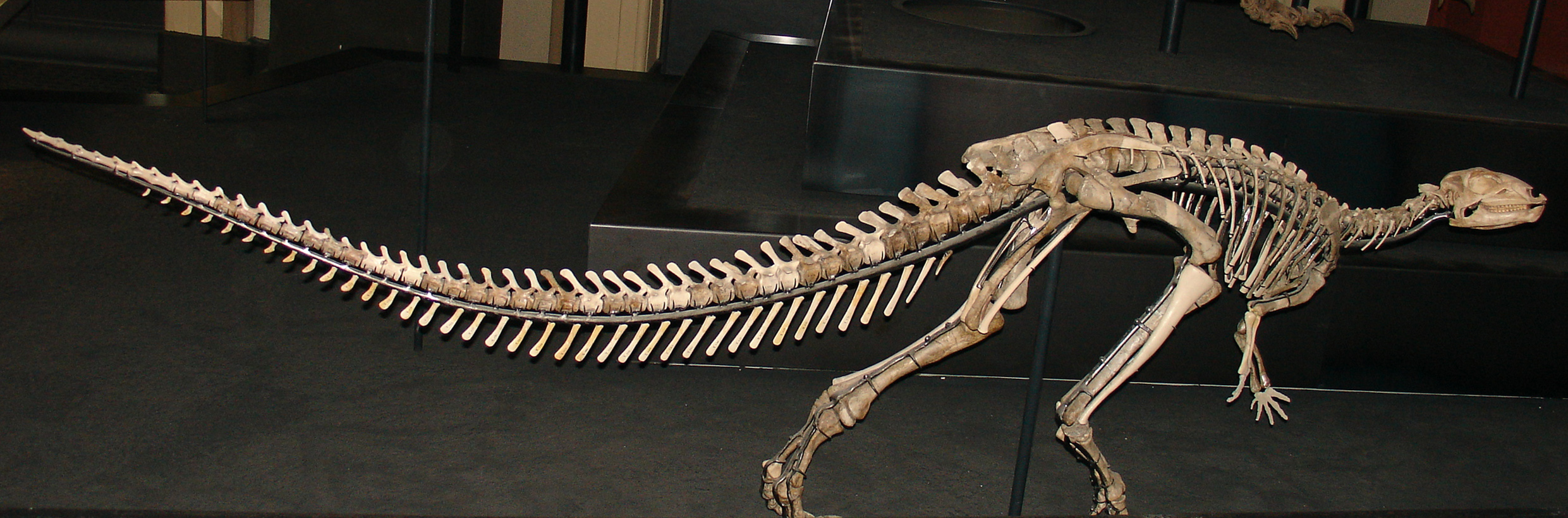
Side view of skeleton

Dysalotosaurus was a precocial dinosaur, which experienced sexual maturity at ten years, had an indeterminate growth pattern, and maximum growth rates comparable to a large kangaroo. A tibia (SMNS T3) and a fibula (GPIT/RE/5109) of Dysalotosaurus preserve evidence of medullary bone tissue, which are found in modern birds that are laying eggs in reproduction, and in some other non-avian dinosaurs such as Tyrannosaurus rex.

=== Palaeopathology ===
In 2011 paleontologists Florian Witzmann and Oliver Hampe from the Museum für Naturkunde and colleagues discovered that deformations of some Dysalotosaurus bones were likely caused by a viral infection similar to Paget's disease of bone. This is the oldest evidence of viral infection known to science.

The discovery of a hemivertebra (spinal malformation) in another specimen likely caused scoliosis and other pathologic effects on the animal during its life. This malformation occurs in almost every vertebrate clade, though this is the first known evidence of the condition in dinosaurs.

== Palaeoecology ==
Contemporary dinosaurs were Kentrosaurus, various sauropods including Giraffatitan and Dicraeosaurus, and large theropods including Megalosaurus and Ceratosaurus. Pterosaurs are also common in the Tendaguru Formation, as well as mammaliaformes (ancestral to mammals).

During the Jurassic, Tendaguru was part of the semi-arid coastline of Gondwana. Dysalotosaurus fossils were discovered in strata that were deposited in structures characteristic of tidal flats and lagoons.
