= Peter Galton =

British vertebrate paleontologist (born 1942)

Peter Malcolm Galton (born 14 March 1942 in London) is a British vertebrate paleontologist who has to date written or co-written about 190 papers in scientific journals or chapters in paleontology textbooks, especially on ornithischian and prosauropod dinosaurs.

With Robert Bakker in a joint article published in Nature in 1974, he argued that dinosaurs constitute a natural monophyletic group, in contrast to the prevailing view that considered them polyphyletic and consisting of two different unrelated orders, thus initiating a revolution in dinosaur studies and contributing to the revival of the popularity of dinosaurs in the field of paleontology.

== Publications ==
- Galton, Peter M. (1970). "The posture of hadrosaurian dinosaurs". Journal of Paleontology. 44 (3): 464–473.
- Galton, Peter M. (1973). "The cheeks of ornithischian dinosaurs". Lethaia. 6 (1): 67–89. Bibcode:1973Letha...6...67G. doi:10.1111/j.1502-3931.1973.tb00873.x.
- Galton, P.M., 1974, "The ornithischian dinosaur Hypsilophodon from the Wealden of the Isle of Wight". British Museum (Natural History), Bulletin, Geology, London, 25: 1‑152c.
- Bakker, R.T. and Galton, P.M. (1974). "Dinosaur monophyly and a new class of vertebrates". Nature 248:168-172.
- Galton, P.M. (1982). "The postcranial anatomy of stegosaurian dinosaur Kentrosaurus from the Upper Jurassic of Tanzania, East Africa". Geologica et Palaeontologica 15:139-165.
- Galton, P.M. (1984). "Cranial anatomy of the prosauropod dinosaur Plateosaurus from the Knollenmergel (Middle Keuper, Upper Triassic) of Germany. I. Two complete skulls from Trossingen/Württ. With comments on the diet". Geologica et Palaeontologica 18:139-171.
- Galton, P.M. (1985). "Cranial anatomy of the prosauropod dinosaur Plateosaurus from the Knollenmergel (Middle Keuper, Upper Triassic) of Germany. II. All the cranial material and details of soft-part anatomy". Geologica et Palaeontologica 19:119-159.
- Galton, P.M. (1986). "Prosauropod dinosaur Plateosaurus (=Gresslyosaurus) (Saurischia: Sauropodomorpha) from the Upper Triassic of Switzerland". Geologica et Paleontologica 20:167-183.
- Galton, P.M. (1988). "Skull bones and endocranial casts of stegosaurian dinosaur Kentrosaurus HENNIG, 1915 from Upper Jurassic of Tanzania, East Africa". Geologica et Palaeontologica 22:123-143.
- Galton, P.M. (1990). "Basal Sauropodomorpha-Prosauropoda". pp. 320–344 in Weishampel, D.B., Dodson, P. and Osmólska, H. (eds.): The Dinosauria. University of California Press, Berkeley
- Galton, P.M. (2000). "The prosauropod dinosaur Plateosaurus Meyer, 1837 (Saurischia, Sauropodomorpha). I: The syntypes of P. engelhardti Meyer, 1837 (Upper Triassic, Germany), with notes on other European prosauropods with "distally straight" femora". Neues Jahrbuch für Geologie und Paläontologie, Abhandlungen 216(2):233-275.
- Galton, P.M. (2001). "The prosauropod dinosaur Plateosaurus Meyer, 1837 (Saurischia: Sauropodomorpha; Upper Triassic). II. Notes on the referred species". Revue Paléobiologie, Genève 20(2):435-502.
- Galton, P.M. and Upchurch, P. (2004). "Prosauropoda". pp. 232–258 in Weishampel Weishampel, D.B., Dodson, P. and Osmólska, H. (eds.): The Dinosauria 2nd Edition. University of California Press, Berkeley.
