= Paludohadros =

Paludohadros Temporal range: Early Cretaceous, Barremian
- Life restoration

Scientific classification
- Kingdom: Animalia
- Phylum: Chordata
- Class: Reptilia
- Clade: Dinosauria
- Clade: †Ornithischia
- Clade: †Ornithopoda
- Superfamily: †Hadrosauroidea
- Genus: †Paludohadros; Sacamoto et al., 2026
- Species: †P. proudlovii

Binomial name
- †Paludohadros proudlovii Sacamoto et al., 2026

Genus of ornithopod dinosaur

Paludohadros (lit. 'swamp hadrosauroid') is an extinct genus of hadrosauroid ornithopod dinosaur known from the Early Cretaceous (Barremian age) Weald Clay Formation of the United Kingdom. The genus contains a single species, Paludohadros proudlovii, known from a partial skull and skeleton, as well as various isolated remains. It is one of several iguanodontian dinosaurs known from the Weald Basin, though all others are from older Valanginian rock layers, including Barilium, Hypselospinus, and Kukufeldia.

== Discovery and naming ==
On July 22, 2001, the British Geologists' Association conducted a field trip to Smokejack Clay Pit (now Ewhurst Works) near the village of Ockley in Surrey, UK. This site, which exposes outcrops of the Weald Clay Formation, is known for yielding the holotype specimen of the spinosaurid theropod Baryonyx walkeri in 1983. During the 2001 excursion, Geoff Toye discovered a partial iguanodontian skull and skeleton in the same rock layer that produced the Baryonyx specimen, albeit around 100 metres (330 ft) west. The site was excavated throughout the next two weeks with the assistance of the Natural History Museum (NHMUK), during which several limb bones were recovered, but only three vertebrae, all of which came from the tail. Two Baryonyx teeth were recovered as well, a possible indication that the iguanodont carcass was scavenged. An initial report by the Geologists' Association in October, 2001 identified the remains as belonging to a juvenile Iguanodon. In 2008, a formal publication described the palaeoenvironment of the quarry that yielded this specimen, focused on fossil pollen and ostracods.

The iguanodont fossil was ultimately donated to the NHMUK, where it is now permanently accessioned as specimen NHMUK PV R 16396. It consists of a partial skull (including several bones of the cranium, braincase, palate, and mandible) and various postcranial remains, including rib fragments, the right pectoral girdle, much of both forelimbs, the right ischium (a pelvic bone), parts of both hindlimbs, and three caudal (tail) vertebrae. In a 2021 review of Smokejacks fossils, these "Iguanodon" remains were instead regarded as belonging to the related genus Mantellisaurus.

In 2026, Ricardo J. Sacamoto and colleagues described Paludohadros proudlovii as a new genus and species of hadrosauroid dinosaur based on these fossil remains, designating NHMUK PV R 16396 as the holotype specimen. Four humeri and four tibiae from Smokejack Pit, described by W. H. E. Rivett in 1953 and 1956, were referred to this species, as was an isolated partial surangular (part of the mandible) from a different Wealden site (which the authors suggested probably originated from the Wessex Formation) on the Isle of Wight. The generic name, Paludohadros, combines the Latin word palūs, meaning 'swamp', with the Greek ἁδρός (hadrós), a suffix often used in hadrosauroid genus names meaning 'stout' or 'robust'. This references the swampy environment this taxon would have inhabited during the Cretaceous, as well as the current muddy conditions of the type locality. The specific name, proudlovii, honors William Proudlove, who managed the Smokejack Pit and died in 2000, shortly before the excavation of the holotype.

== Description ==
The P. proudlovii holotype individual is estimated to have been about 5 metres (16 ft) long. The unfused vertebrae and rugose texture on the limb bones both suggest this individual was not fully mature when it died. The femur is 63 cm (25 in) long, intermediate between the holotypes of Mantellisaurus atherfieldensis (57 cm (22 in)) and Comptonatus chasei (73.5 cm (28.9 in)), both of represent more mature animals. The femora of mature Iguanodon bernissartensis are around 104 cm (41 in) long, with mature individuals reaching up to around 11 m (36 ft) in length. It is thus possible that Paludohadros could have reached comparable sizes when fully grown. This is supported by specimen NHMUK PV R 105a, the referred isolated surangular found on the Isle of Wight, which belongs to a much larger individual than the holotype.

The skeleton of Paludohadros is distinguished from other iguanodontians by several anatomical characters, including the number of ridges on the teeth of the lower jaw, the presence of a well developed dorsally (upward) projecting lateral process of the surangular bone of the lower jaw, the distal condyle of the humerus having a ridge that projects proximally (towards the body), the ischium curving posteroventrally (backwards and downwards) and has a well developed boot, and a tibia with bosses (growths) on the proximal end (closest to the knee joint).

== Classification ==
To test the affinities and relationships of Paludohadros, Sacamoto et al. (2026) included it in an updated version of the phylogenetic matrix of Poole (2022). They recovered it as the sister taxon to Istiorachis, another Wealden taxon from the Wessex Formation. This clade of early-diverging hadrosauroids also included Xuwulong and Kukufeldia. These results are displayed in the cladogram below:

- Styracosterna
  - Dakotadon lakotaensis
  - - - Cumnoria prestwichii
      - Owenodon hoggii
      - Theiophytalia kerri
    - - Iguanacolossus fortis
      - - Lanzhousaurus magnidens
        - - - Bolong yixianensis
            - Hippodraco scutodens
          - - - Ouranosaurus nigeriensis
              - - - Barilium dawsoni
                  - Hypselospinus fittoni
                - - Cedrorestes crichtoni
                  - Lurdusaurus arenatus
            - Hadrosauriformes
              - - Jinzhousaurus yangi
                - - - Equijubus normani
                    - Iguanodon bernissartensis
                  - - Fukuisaurus tetoriensis
                    - Proa valdearinnoensis
              - Hadrosauroidea
                - - Comptonatus chasei
                  - - Brighstoneus simmondsi
                    - Mantellisaurus atherfieldensis
                - - - Kukufeldia tilgatensis
                    - - Xuwulong yueluni
                      - - Istiorachis macarthurae
                        - Paludohadros proudlovii
                  - - Probactrosaurus gobiensis
                    - Hadrosauromorpha

== Palaeoecology ==
Life restoration of Paludohadros (foreground) and Baryonyx (background) in the Weald Clay palaeoenvironment

Paludohadros is known from the Weald Clay Formation, a unit of the Wealden Group that dates to the Barremian age of the early Cretaceous period. The Wealden Group is split into two major subunits: the Weald Basin (to which the Weald Clay belongs) and the Wessex Basin. Many other styracosternan ornithopod dinosaurs are known from the other formations in these units, though Paludohadros is the first one named from the Weald Clay, as well as the first named based on fossils from Barremian-aged rocks in the Weald Basin. Other Weald Basin iguanodontians, such as Barilium, Hypselospinus, and Kukufeldia, derive from other Valanginian-aged rocks.

Analyses of the outcrops of the Weald Clay at Smokejack Clay Pit indicate that it was deposited in marshy conditions, the region being a shallow, temporary floodplain. Schizaceous ferns and tree ferns were the predominant undergrowth components within conifer forests. Dinosaurs are the best-represented vertebrate fossils in the Weald Clay Formation. In addition to Paludohadros, the spinosaurid theropod Baryonyx is also known from the Smokejack Clay Pit. Other localities have produced the indeterminate maniraptoran theropod Wyleyia, the ankylosaur Horshamosaurus, and the dryosaurid ornithopod Valdosaurus.
