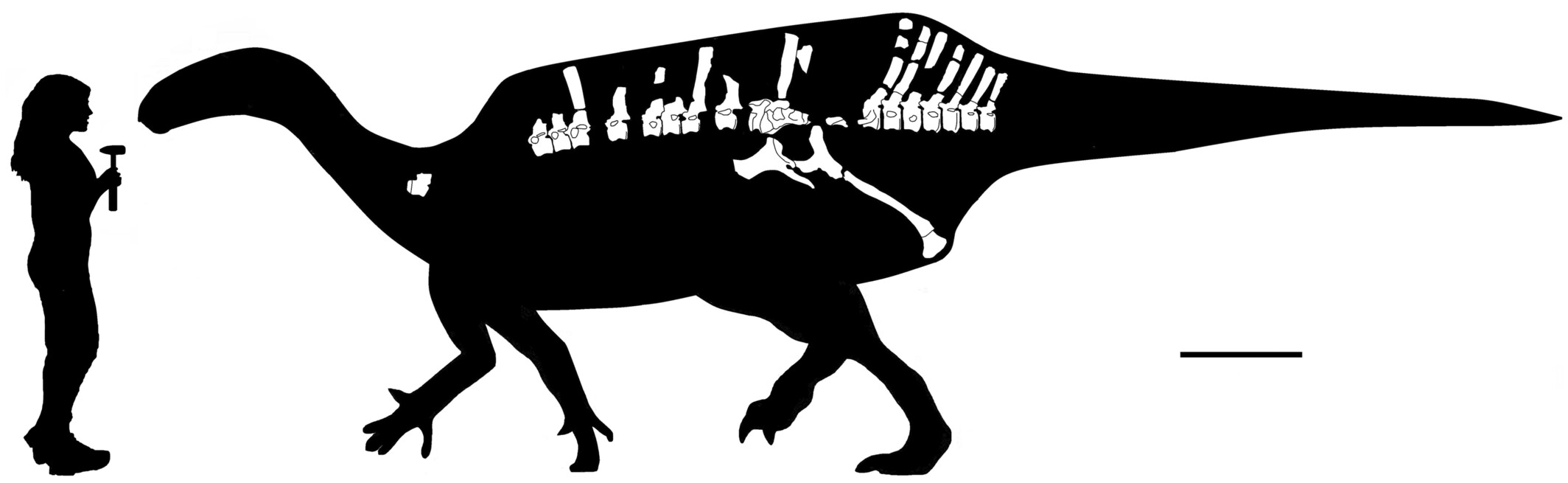
- Reconstructed skeleton with a human for scale

Scientific classification
- Kingdom: Animalia
- Phylum: Chordata
- Class: Reptilia
- Clade: Dinosauria
- Clade: †Ornithischia
- Clade: †Ornithopoda
- Clade: †Ankylopollexia
- Clade: †Styracosterna
- Genus: †Istiorachis; Lockwood, Martill & Maidment, 2025
- Species: †I. macarthurae

Binomial name
- †Istiorachis macarthurae Lockwood, Martill & Maidment, 2025

= Istiorachis =

Istiorachis Temporal range: Early Cretaceous, Barremian

Genus of ornithopod dinosaurs

Istiorachis (meaning "sail spine") is an extinct genus of iguanodontian ornithopod dinosaur from the Early Cretaceous (Barremian age) Wessex Formation of the Isle of Wight, England. The genus contains a single species, Istiorachis macarthurae, known from a partial postcranial skeleton including several vertebrae, incomplete ribs, and part of the pelvis. Its vertebral neural spines are notably elongated, giving the animal a 'sail-backed' appearance.

== Discovery and naming ==
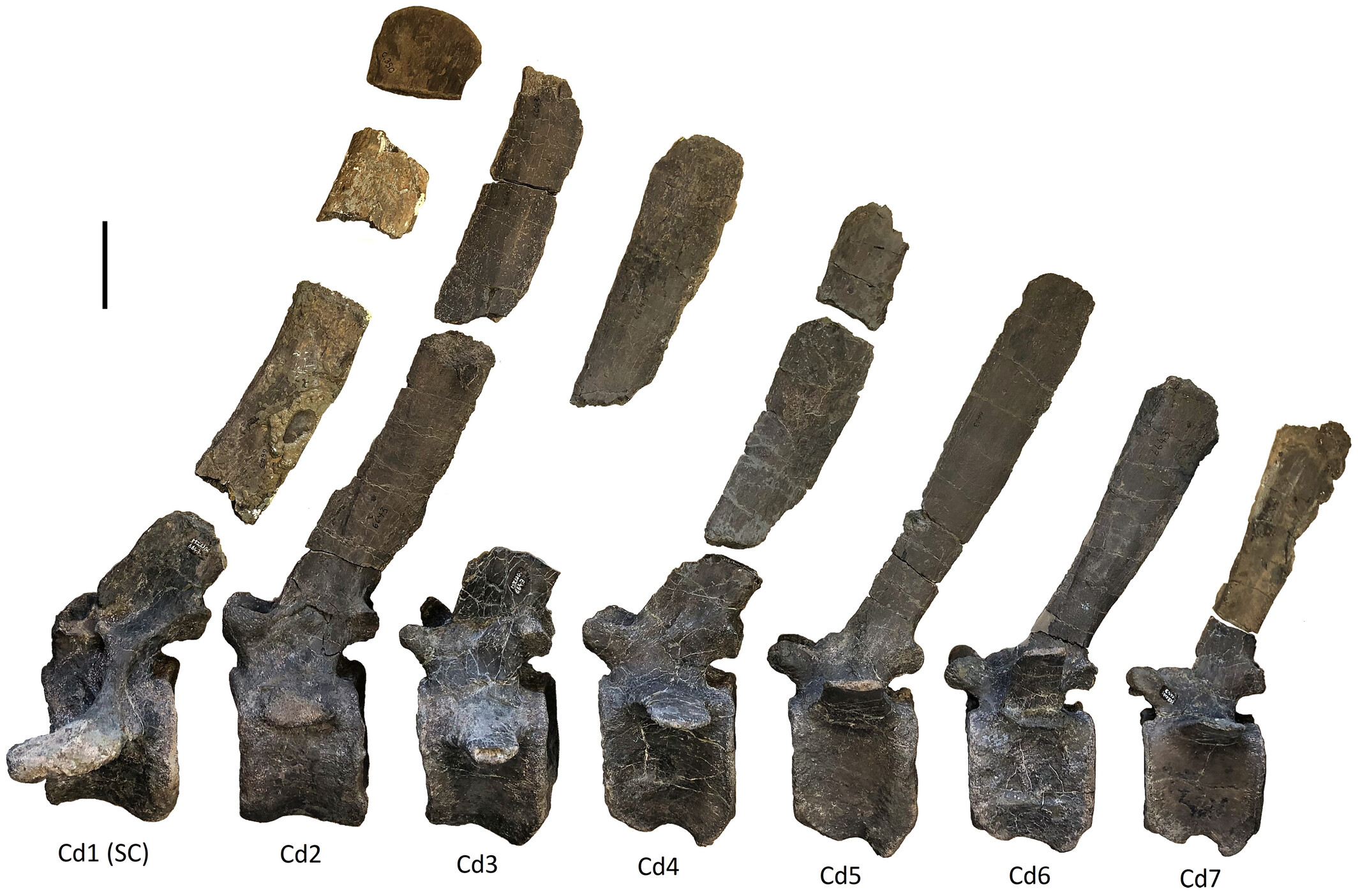
Holotype tail vertebrae with elongated neural spines

The holotype specimen, MIWG 6643, was discovered by Nicholas Chase in a rock bed of plant debris representing outcrops of the Wessex Formation near Grange Chine on the Isle of Wight, England. It consists of several vertebrae (one cervical (neck), eight dorsals, part of the sacrum, and seven caudals (tail)), three dorsal rib heads, and part of the pelvic girdle (both pubes and ischia). The excavation site was poached during collection, resulting in the loss of an undetermined amount of the skeleton. This rock layer has also yielded the remains of the early tyrannosauroid Eotyrannus.

In 2025, Jeremy Lockwood, David Martill, Susannah Maidment described Istiorachis macarthurae as a new genus and species of iguanodont dinosaur. The generic name, Istiorachis, is derived from the Ancient Greek words ἱστίον (istion), meaning "sail", and ῥάχις (rhachis), meaning "backbone" or "spine", alluding to the animal's tall sail-forming neural spines. The specific name, macarthurae, honours sailor and Isle of Wight native Dame Ellen MacArthur, who set the world record of the fastest solo non-stop voyage around the world in 2005.

== Description ==
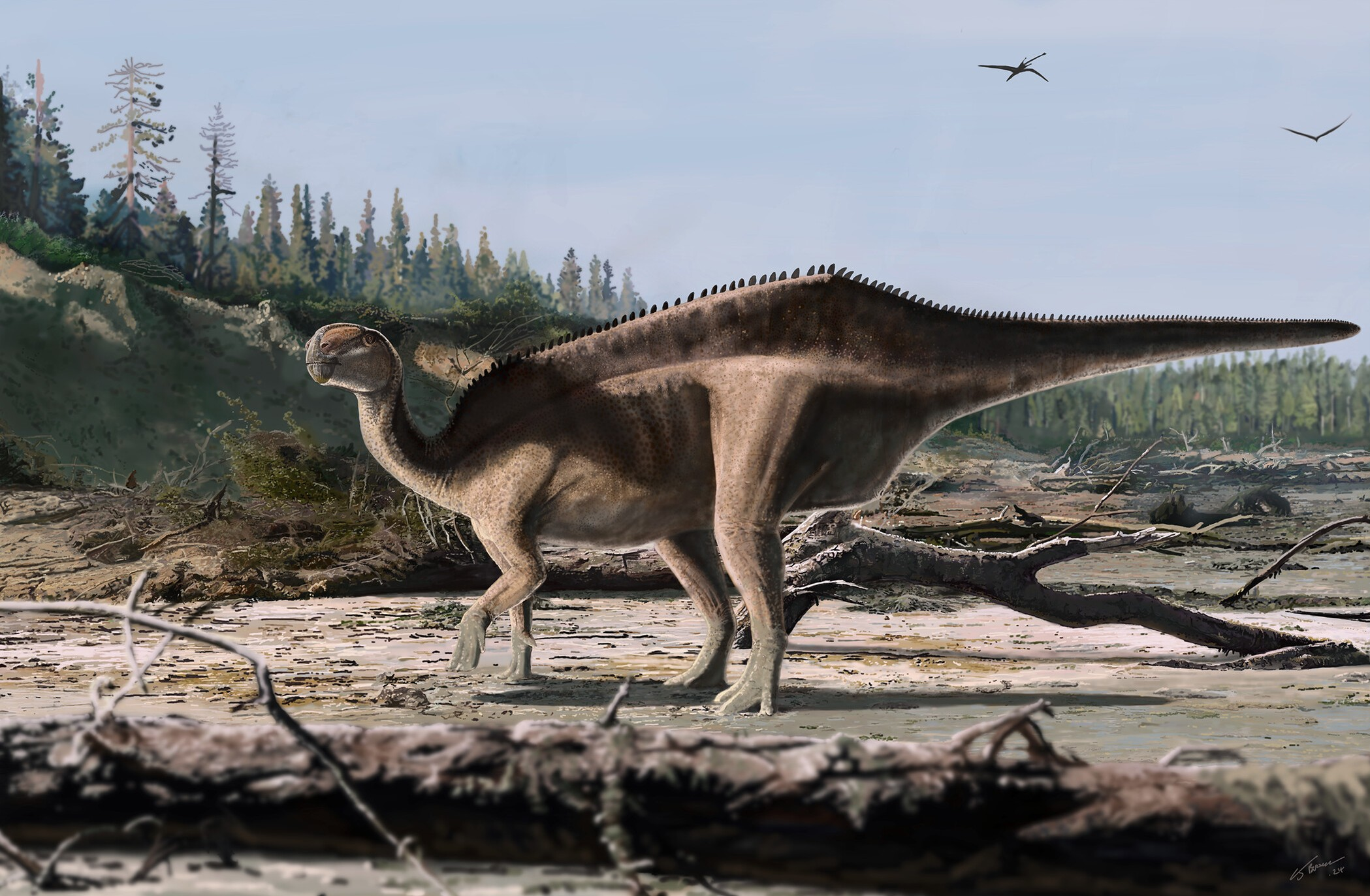
Speculative life restoration

Istiorachis is characterized by its elongated neural spines that form a sail-like structure, also present in other related iguanodonts such as Ouranosaurus, Hypselospinus, and Morelladon.

== Classification ==
To assess the relationships of Istiorachis, Lockwood et al. (2025) scored this taxon in a phylogenetic analysis modified from the one in the description paper of the coeval iguanodontid Comptonatus, which was published by the same authors the previous year. A strict consensus tree placed Istiorachis in a large unresolved polytomy forming the base of Hadrosauriformes. Using extended implied weighting (k=3), the researchers recovered Istiorachis as the sister taxon to Ouranosaurus within the iguanodontian clade Styracosterna, diverging immediately before the Hadrosauriformes (the clade including Iguanodontidae and Hadrosauroidea).

In 2026, Sacamoto and colleagues described Paludohadros, another Wealden iguanodontian. Using a different phylogenetic matrix, they found Istiorachis to be only distantly related to Ouranosaurus, the former now placed as the sister taxon to Paludohadros. These results are displayed in the cladogram below:

- Styracosterna
  - Dakotadon
  - - - Theiophytalia
      - Owenodon
      - Cumnoria
    - - Iguanacolossus
      - - Lanzhousaurus
        - - - Hippodraco
            - Bolong
          - - - Ouranosaurus
              - - - Hypselospinus
                  - Barilium
                - - Lurdusaurus
                  - Cedrorestes
            - Hadrosauriformes
              - - Jinzhousaurus
                - - - Iguanodon
                    - Equijubus
                  - - Proa
                    - Fukuisaurus
              - Hadrosauroidea
                - - Comptonatus
                  - - Mantellisaurus
                    - Brighstoneus
                - - Hadrosauromorpha
                  - - Kukufeldia
                    - - Xuwulong
                      - - Istiorachis
                        - Paludohadros

== Paleoenvironment ==
Istiorachis is one of several iguanodontians known from the Isle of Wight, distinct from Iguanodon, Mantellisaurus, Brighstoneus, and Comptonatus. The deposition of the Wessex Formation likely spans several million years, and so it is unlikely to have been contemporaneous with all of these other taxa. The Wessex Formation had a warm and semi-arid Mediterranean climate, formed on alluvial meander plains. Forests on higher ground north of the floodplain consisted of Pinophyta, Ginkgophyta, "Pteridophyta", Cycadophyta. Forest fires and floods were common occurrences, resulting in the formation of plant debris beds.
