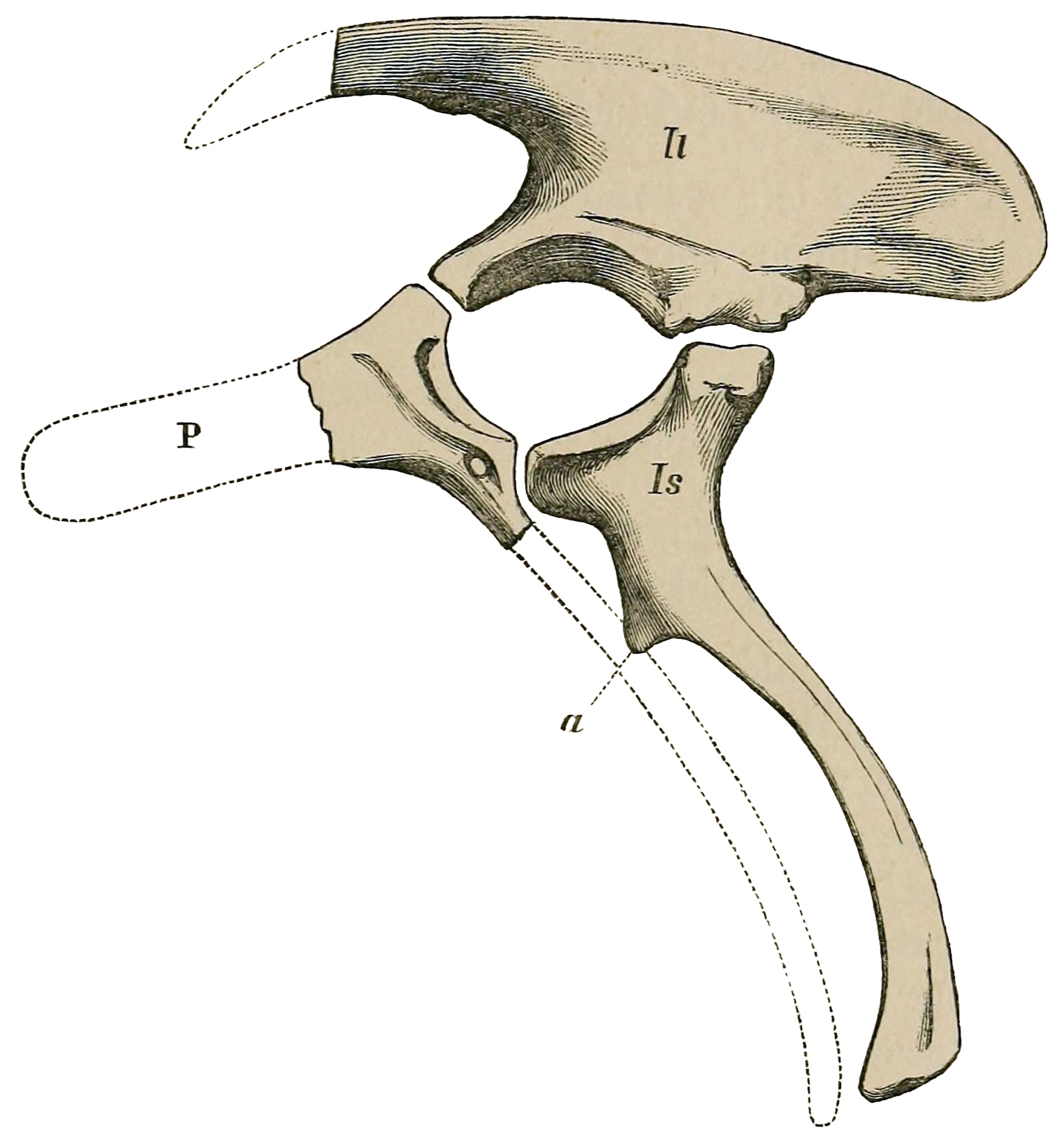
- Pelvis

Scientific classification
- Kingdom: Animalia
- Phylum: Chordata
- Class: Reptilia
- Clade: Dinosauria
- Clade: †Ornithischia
- Clade: †Ornithopoda
- Clade: †Styracosterna
- Genus: †Barilium; Norman, 2010
- Species: †B. dawsoni

Binomial name
- †Barilium dawsoni (Lydekker, 1888 [originally Iguanodon])

Synonyms
- Iguanodon dawsoni Lydekker, 1888; Torilion dawsoni Carpenter & Ishida, 2010; Sellacoxa pauli Carpenter & Ishida, 2010; Kukufeldia tilgatensis McDonald et al., 2010

= Barilium =

Barilium Temporal range: Early Cretaceous, 140 Ma

Extinct genus of dinosaurs

Barilium is a genus of iguanodontian dinosaur which was first described as a species of Iguanodon (I. dawsoni) by Richard Lydekker in 1888, the specific epithet honouring the discoverer Charles Dawson, who collected the holotype during the 1880s.

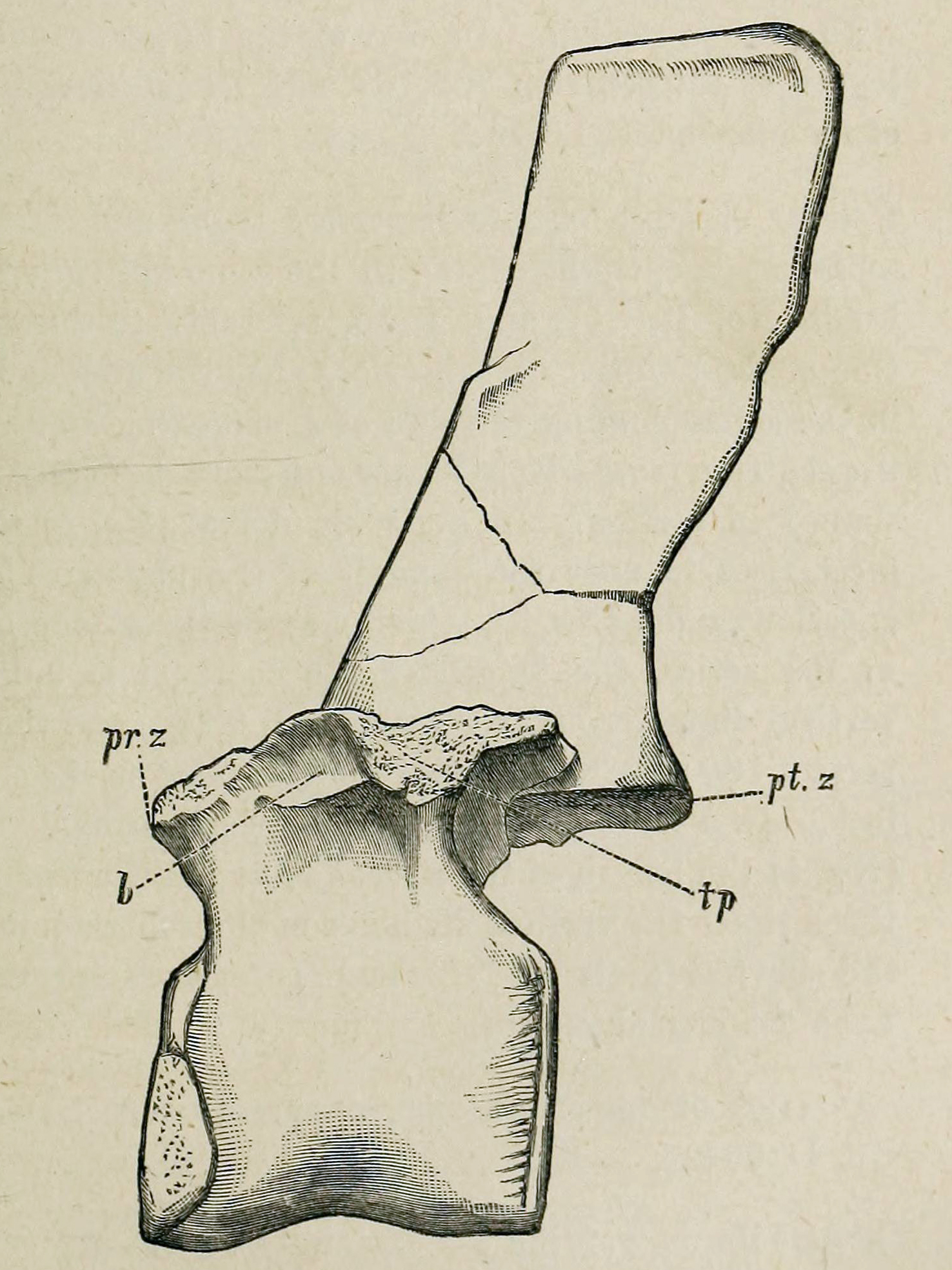
Middle dorsal vertebra

In 2010 it was reclassified as a separate genus by David Norman. The generic name Barilium is derived from Greek barys, "heavy", and Latin ilium. Later in 2010, Kenneth Carpenter and Yusuke Ishida independently assigned it to the new genus Torilion, which is thus a junior objective synonym of Barilium. It is known from two partial skeletons found near St Leonards-on-Sea in East Sussex, England, from the middle Valanginian-age Lower Cretaceous Wadhurst Clay. Lydekker based the species on the syntype series NHMUK R798, 798a, 803-805, 806, 798b, 802, 802a and 799-801. Norman chose NHMUK R 798 and R802, a dorsal vertebra and a left ilium, as the lectotype.

A contemporary of Hypselospinus (also once thought to be a species of Iguanodon), Barilium was a robust iguanodontian estimated at 8 metres (26 feet) long.

Barilium is separated from Hypselospinus on the basis of vertebral and pelvic characters, size, and build. For example, Barilium was more robust than Hypselospinus, with large Camptosaurus-like vertebrae featuring short neural spines, whereas Hypselospinus is known for its "long, narrow, and steeply inclined neural spines".

In their 2026 description of Paludohadros, a roughly contemporary styracosternan from the Weald Clay, Sacamoto and colleagues treated Barilium and Kukufeldia (generally regarded as synonymous with the former) as distinct taxa, and their phylogenetic analysis recovered them in clearly distinct positions within Styracosterna. Barilium was placed outside the styracosternan clade Hadrosauriformes, in a clade also containing Hypselospinus and Ouranosaurus, while Kukufeldia was placed within the hadrosauriform subclade Hadrosauroidea, in a clade including the contemporary Paludohadros, Istiorachis, and the Chinese Xuwulong. These results are displayed in the cladogram below:

- Styracosterna
  - Dakotadon lakotaensis
  - - - Cumnoria prestwichii
      - Owenodon hoggii
      - Theiophytalia kerri
    - - Iguanacolossus fortis
      - - Lanzhousaurus magnidens
        - - - Bolong yixianensis
            - Hippodraco scutodens
          - - - Ouranosaurus nigeriensis
              - - - Barilium dawsoni
                  - Hypselospinus fittoni
                - - Cedrorestes crichtoni
                  - Lurdusaurus arenatus
            - Hadrosauriformes
              - - Jinzhousaurus yangi
                - - - Equijubus normani
                    - Iguanodon bernissartensis
                  - - Fukuisaurus tetoriensis
                    - Proa valdearinnoensis
              - Hadrosauroidea
                - - Comptonatus chasei
                  - - Brighstoneus simmondsi
                    - Mantellisaurus atherfieldensis
                - - - Kukufeldia tilgatensis
                    - - Xuwulong yueluni
                      - - Istiorachis macarthurae
                        - Paludohadros proudlovii
                  - - Probactrosaurus gobiensis
                    - Hadrosauromorpha
