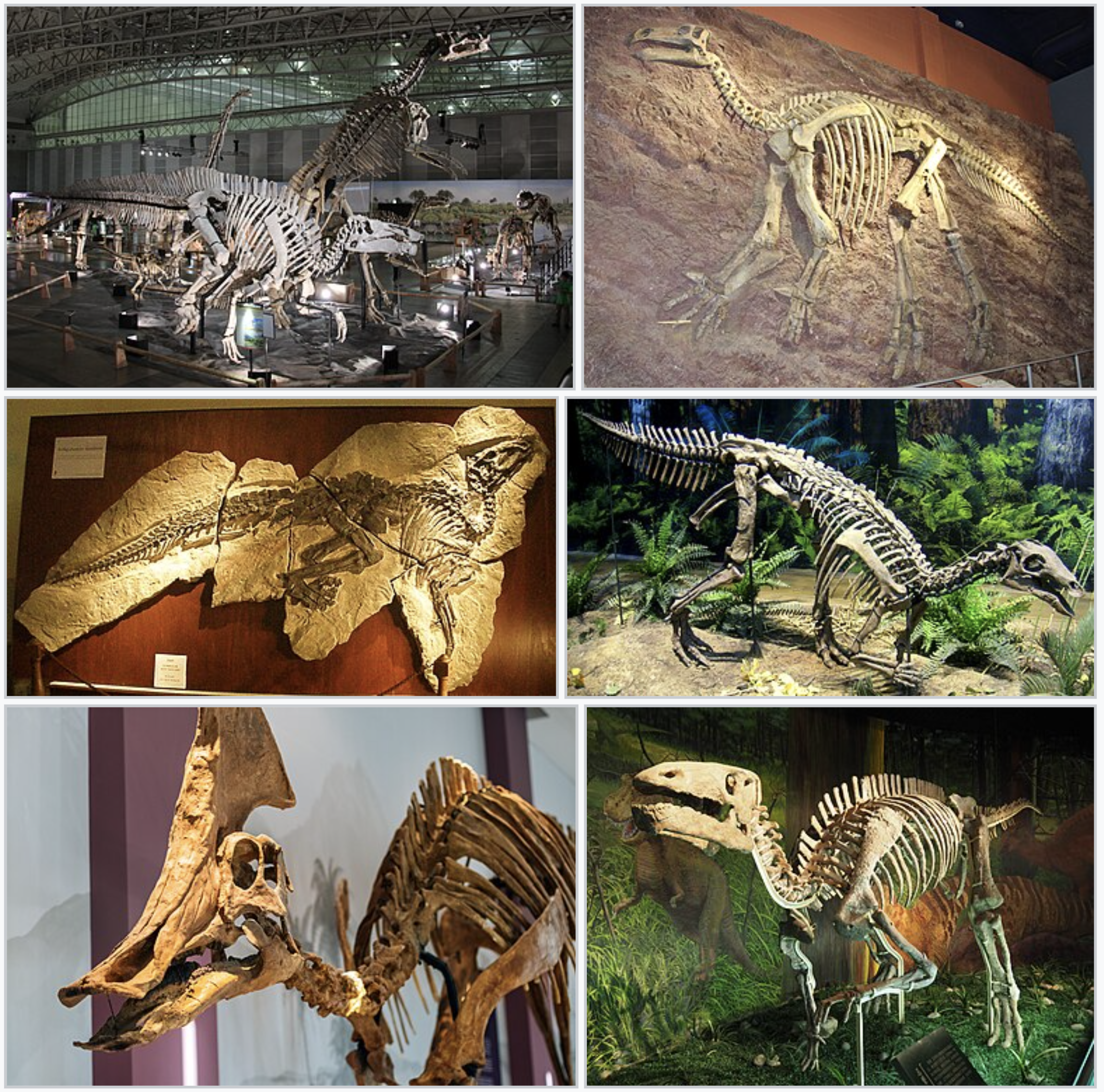
- Six ankylopollexian ornithopods (top left to bottom right): Shantungosaurus, Iguanodon, Tethyshadros, Uteodon, Olorotitan, Gongpoquansaurus

Scientific classification
- Kingdom: Animalia
- Phylum: Chordata
- Class: Reptilia
- Clade: Dinosauria
- Clade: †Ornithischia
- Clade: †Ornithopoda
- Clade: †Dryomorpha
- Clade: †Ankylopollexia; Sereno, 1986

Subgroups
- †Camptosaurus; †Cumnoria; †Draconyx?; †Oblitosaurus?; †Owenodon?; †Uteodon; †Styracosterna Sereno, 1986; †Barilium; †Batyrosaurus?; †Burianosaurus?; †Calvarius; †Cedrorestes; †Dakotadon; †Emiliasaura?; †Fukuisaurus; †Hippodraco; †Iguanacolossus; †Istiorachis; †Lanzhousaurus; †Lurdusaurus; †Napaisaurus; †Osmakasaurus; †Planicoxa; †Proa; †Ratchasimasaurus?; †Riabininohadros; †Shuangmiaosaurus; †Theiophytalia; †Neoiguanodontia; †Bayannurosaurus; †Hypselospinus; †Ouranosauria; †Brighstoneus; †Morelladon; †Ouranosaurus; †Hadrosauriformes Sereno, 1997; †Bolong; †Jinzhousaurus; †Magnamanus; †Mantellisaurus; †Iguanodontidae; †Hadrosauroidea

= Ankylopollexia =

Ankylopollexia Temporal range: Late Jurassic–Late Cretaceous, 156.3–66 Ma

Extinct clade of dinosaurs

Ankylopollexia is an extinct clade of ornithischian dinosaurs that lived from the Late Jurassic to the Late Cretaceous. It is a derived clade of iguanodontian ornithopods and contains the subgroup Styracosterna. The name stems from the Greek word, "ankylos", mistakenly taken to mean stiff, fused (in fact the adjective means bent or curved; used of fingers, it can mean hooked), and the Latin word, "pollex", meaning thumb. Originally described in 1986 by Sereno, a most likely synapomorphic feature of a conical thumb spine defines the clade.

First appearing around 156 million years ago, in the Jurassic, Ankylopollexia became an extremely successful and widespread clade during the Cretaceous, and were found around the world. The group died out at the end of the Maastrichtian. They grew to be quite large, comparable to some carnivorous dinosaurs and they were universally herbivorous.

== Description ==
=== Size ===
Size of three ankylopollexians (Edmontosaurus, Iguanodon, and Camptosaurus) compared to other ornithopods

Ankylopollexians vary greatly in size. Jurassic genus Camptosaurus was small, no more than 5 metres (16 ft) in length and half a tonne in weight. The largest known ankylopollexian, dating to the late Campanian age (around 70 million years ago), belonged to the hadrosaurid family, and is named Shantungosaurus. It was around 14.7 metres (48 ft) to 16.6 metres (54 ft) in length and weighed, for the largest individuals, up to 16 tonnes (18 short tons).

Primitive ankylopollexians tended to be smaller as compared to the larger, more derived hadrosaurs. There are, however, exceptions to this trend. A single track from a large ornithopod, likely a relative of Camptosaurus, was reported from the Lourinhã Formation, dating to the Jurassic in Portugal. The corresponding animal had an estimated hip height of around 2.8 metres (9.2 ft), much larger than the contemporary relative Draconyx. The primitive styracosternan Iguanacolossus was named for its distinct robustness and large size, likely around 9 metres (30 ft) in length. Regarding hadrosaurs, one of the more basal members of Hadrosauroidea, the Chinese genus Bolong, is estimated to have been around 200 kilograms (440 lb). Another exception of this trend is Tethyshadros, a more derived genus of Hadrosauroidea. Estimated to have weighed 350 kilograms (770 lb), Tethyshadros have been found only on certain islands in Italy. Its diminutive size is explained by insular dwarfism.

=== Thumb spike ===
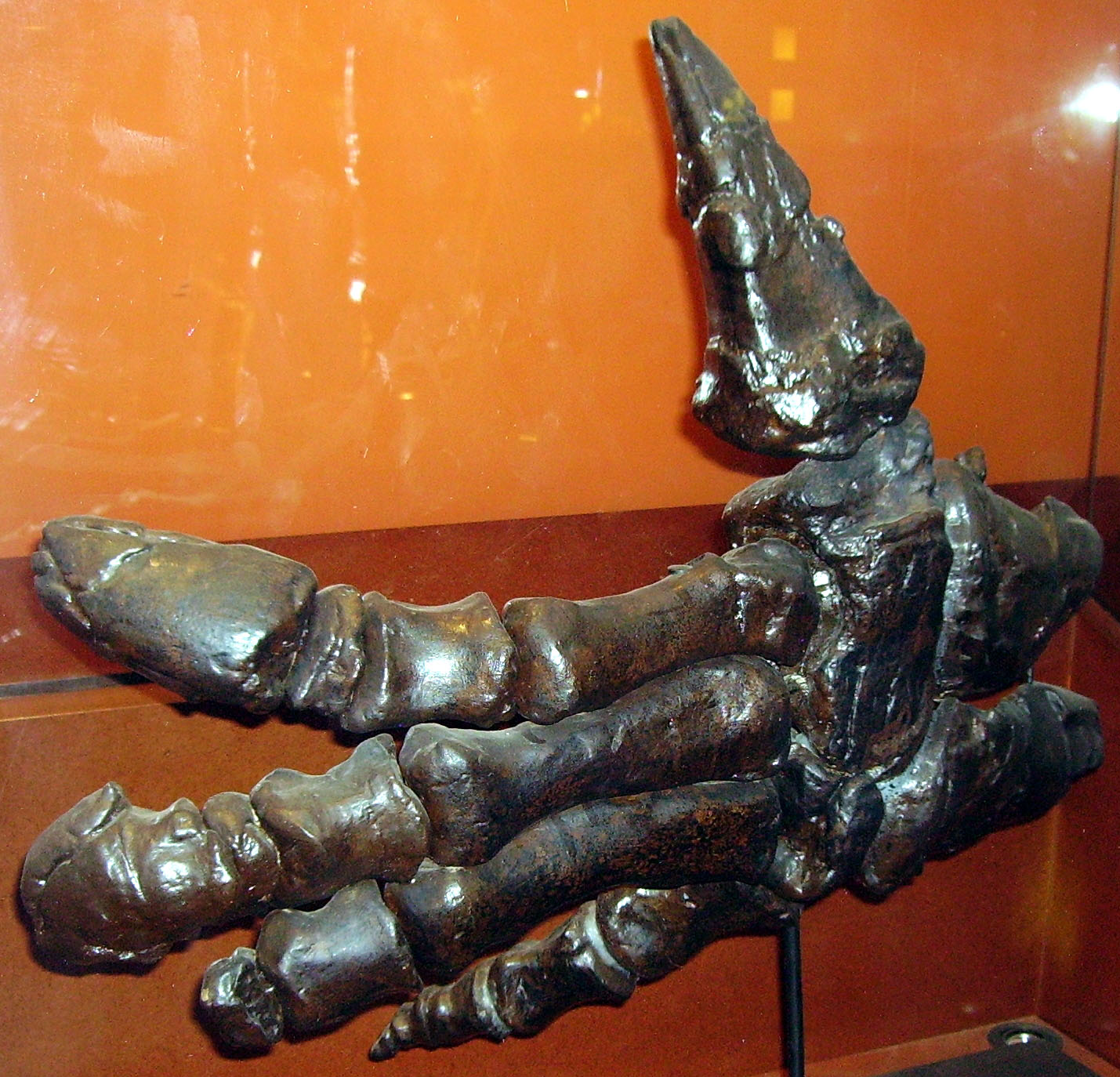
Hand of Iguanodon, showing the distinctive thumb of the group

Many basal members of the ankylopollexian subgroup Styracosterna possess a large conical spike shaped "thumb" ungual bone. Various uses have been proposed, including as a "mating aid, defensive weapon against predators or weapon for intraspecific combat", with a combat use being considered a likely function.

=== Brain ===
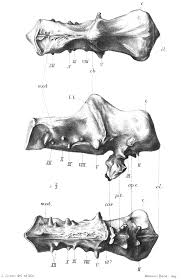
Brain endocast of an Iguanodon, created in 1897 from specimen NHMUK R2501

The neurobiology of ankylopollexians has been studied as far back as 1871, when a well preserved cranium (specimen NHMUK R2501) discovered in September 1869 from the Wealden Group on the Isle of Wight and tentatively referred to the genus Iguanodon was described by John Hulke. He noted that due to the lesser correlation of the shape of the brain and wall of cranial cavity in reptiles, any deduction of the shape of the brain of the animal would be approximate. The referral of this skull was reinforced in a later study, published in 1897. It was here inquired that the brain of the dinosaur may have been more closely associated to the cavity than that of modern reptiles, and so an endocast was created and studied. This was not the first endocast of an ankylopolloxian brain, for in 1893, the skull of a Claosaurus annectens (today referred to the genus Edmontosaurus) was used by Othniel Charles Marsh to create a cast of the brain cavity. Some basics remarks were made, including the small size of the organ, but interpreting minute features of the organ was noted to be difficult. The 1897 paper noted the similarity of the two endocasts.

Hadrosaurs have been noted as having the most complex brains among ankylopollexians, and indeed among ornithischian dinosaurs as a whole. The brains of a large variety of taxa have been studied. John Ostrom, would, in 1961, provide what was then the most extensive and detailed review and work on hadrosaur neuro-anatomy. This area of hadrosaur study was in its infancy at this point, and only the species known today as Edmontosaurus annectens, Edmontosaurus regalis, and Gryposaurus notabilis (at that time thought to be a synonym of its relative Kritosaurus) had specimens suitable at the time to be examined (Lambeosaurus was listed as having a briefly described braincase, but this was a mistake originating in Lull and Wright (1942)). Ostrom supported the view that the brains of hadrosaurs and other dinosaurs would've likely only filled a portion of the cranial cavity, therefore hindering the ability to learn from endocasts, but noted they were still useful. He noted, similar to Marsh, noted the small predicted size of the organ, but also that it was significantly developed. A number of similarities to the brains of modern reptiles were noted.

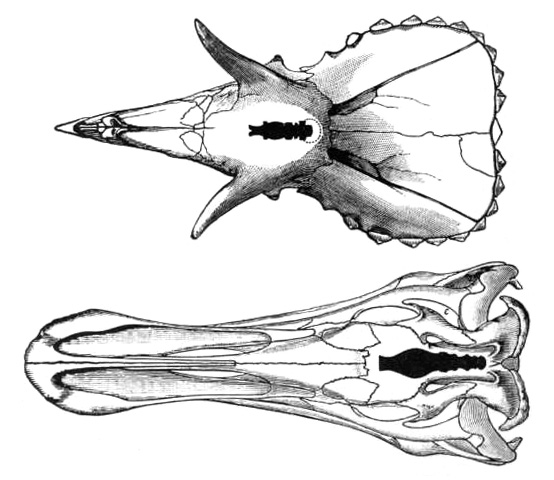
A 1905 diagram showing the small size of an Edmontosaurus annectens brain (bottom; alongside that of Triceratops horridus, top) commented on in early sources

James Hopson investigated the encephalization quotients (EQs) of various dinosaurs in 1977 study. Three ornithopods for which brain endocasts had previously been produced – Camptosaurus, Iguanodon, and Anatosaurus (now known as Edmontosaurus annectens) – were investigated. It was found that they had relatively high EQs compared to many other dinosaurs (ranging from 0.8 to 1.5), comparable to that of carnosaurian theropods and of modern crocodilians, but far lower than that of coelurosaurian theropods. The latter two genera, which lived later than Camptosaurus, had somewhat higher EQs than the Jurassic taxon, which, being at the lower end, was more comparable to the ceratopsian genus Protoceratops. Reasonings suggested for their comparably high intelligence were the need for acute senses in the lack of defensive weapons, and more complex intraspecific behaviours as indicated by their acoustic and visual display structures.

In a first for any terrestrial fossil vertebrate, Brasier et al. (2017) reported mineralized soft tissues from the brain of an iguanodontian dinosaur, from the Valanginian age (around 133 million years ago) Upper Tunbridge Wells Formation at Bexhill, Sussex. Fragmentary ornithopod remains were associated with the fossil, and though assigning the specimen to any one taxon with certainty wasn't possible, Barilium or Hypselospinus were put forward as likely candidates. The specimen compared well to endocasts of similar taxa, such as one from a Mantellisaurus on display at the Oxford University Museum of Natural History. Detailed observations were made with the use of a scanning electron microscope. Only some parts of the brain were preserved; the cerebellar and cerebral expansions were best preserved, whereas the olfactory lobes and medulla oblongata were missing or nearly so. The neural tissues seemed to be very tightly packed, indicating an EC closer to five (with hadrosaurs having even higher ECs), nearly matching that of the most intelligent non-avian theropods. Though it was noted this was in-line with their complex behaviour, as had been noted by Hopson, it was cautioned the dense packing may have been an artifact of preservation, and the original lower estimates were considered more accurate. Some of the complex behaviours ascribed can be seen to some extent in modern crocodilians, who fall near the original numbers.

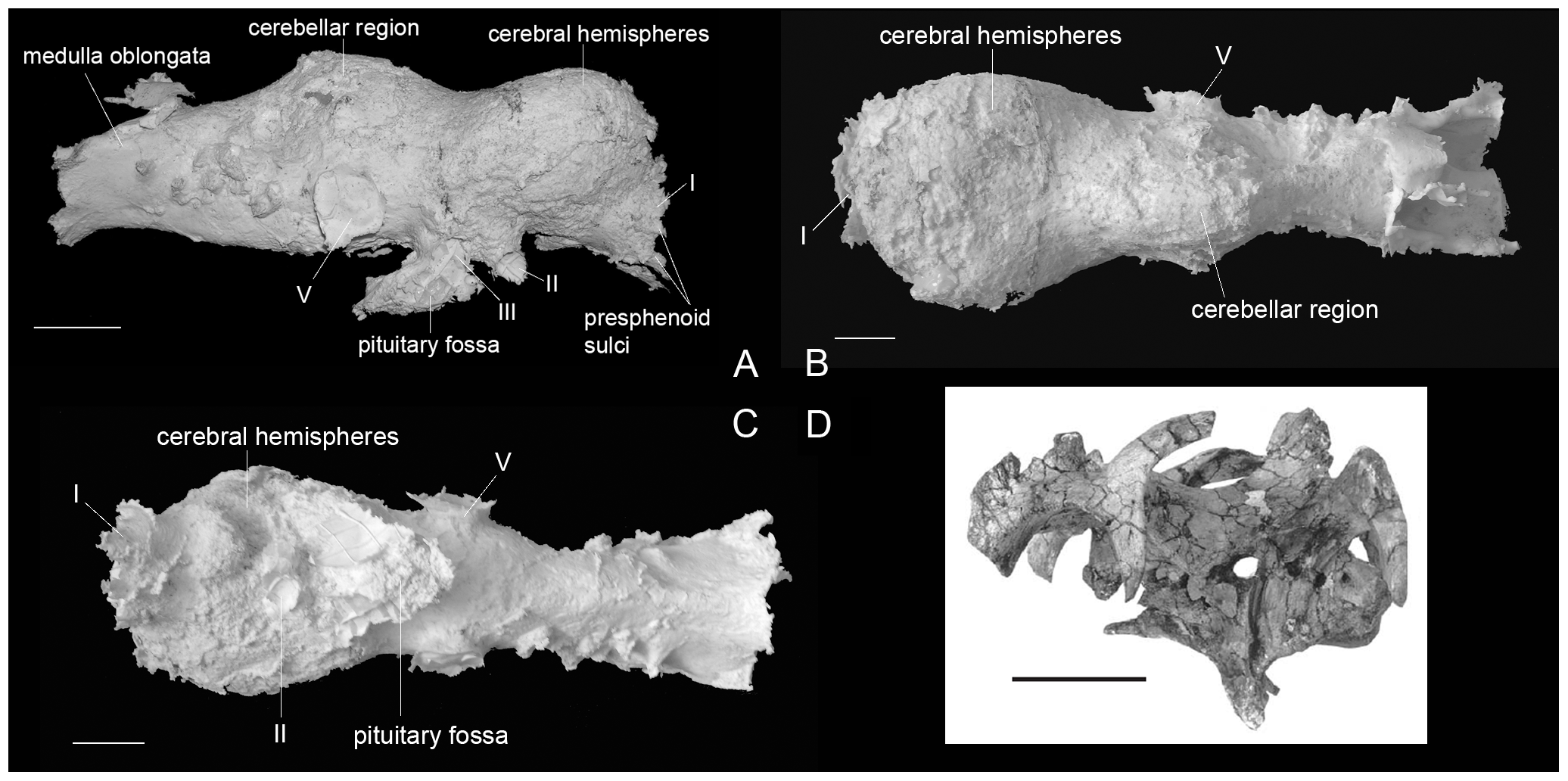
Endocast of an Amurosaurus brain in right lateral (A), dorsal (B), and ventral (C) views

The advent of CT scanning for use in palaeontology has allowed for more widespread application of this without the need for specimen destruction. Modern research using these methods has focused largely on hadrosaurs. In a 2009 study by palaeontologist David C. Evans and colleagues, the brains of various lambeosaurine hadrosaur genera were scanned and compared to each other, related taxa, and previous predictions. Contra the early works, Evans' studies indicate that only some regions of the hadrosaur brain were loosely correlated to the brain wall. As with previous studies, EQ values were investigated; even the lowest end of the determined EQ range was still higher than that of modern reptiles and most non-maniraptoran dinosaurs, though fell well short of maniraptorans themselves. The size of the cerebral hemispheres was, for the first time, remarked upon, being far larger than in other ornithischians and all large saurischian dinosaurs; maniraptorans Conchoraptor and Archaeopteryx had very similar proportions. This lends further support to the idea of complex behaviours and relatively high intelligence, for non-avian dinosaurs, in hadrosaurids. Lambeosaurine Amurosaurus was the subject of a 2013 paper once again looking into a cranial endocast. A once again high EQ range was found, higher than that of living reptiles, sauropods and other ornithischians, but different EQ estimates for theropods were cited, placing the hadrosaur numbers significantly below the majority of theropods. Additionally, the relative cerebral volume was only 30% in Amurosaurus, significantly lower than in Hypacrosaurus, closer to that of theropods like Tyrannosaurus, though still distinctly larger than previously estimated numbers for more primitive iguanodonts. This demonstrated a previously unrecognized level of variation in neuro-anatomy within Hadrosauridae.

== Evolution ==
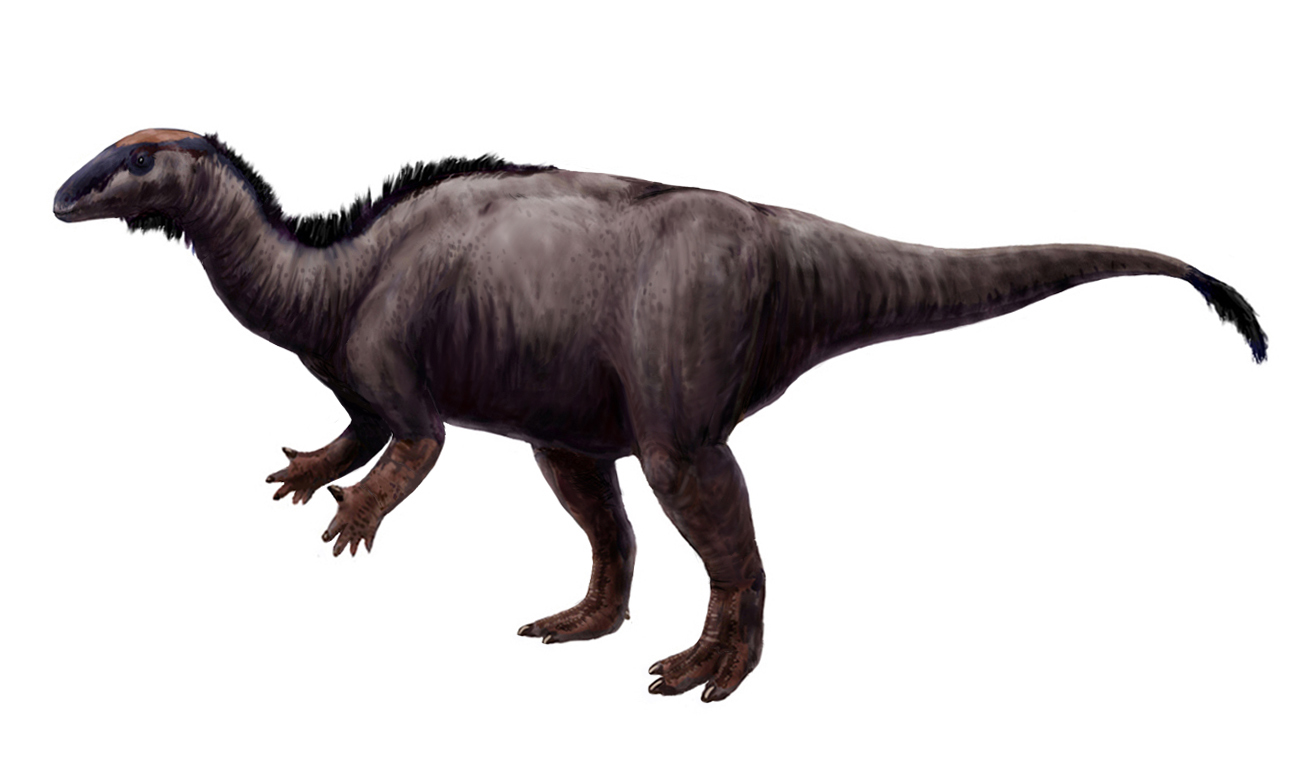
Life restoration of Camptosaurus, one of the earliest and most primitive ankylopollexians, known from the Late Jurassic of North America

Ankylopollexians are thought to have diverged from other ornithopods like dryosaurids in the Middle Jurassic. The earliest members of Ankyopollexia, like Camptosaurus, are known from the Late Jurassic in the Northern Hemisphere in North America and Europe. During the Early Cretaceous, members of the subgroup Styracosterna became increasingly quadrupedal and developed larger body sizes, along with accompanying changes to skeletal anatomy. In the Early Cretaceous, ankyopollexians were present across the ecosystems of Asia, Europe and North America, with some like members like Ouranosaurus dispersing into Africa. During the Late Cretaceous, the Hadrosauridae would emerge as the dominant group of ankylopollexians, being major herbivores in Asian and North American ecosystems, with hadrosaurids or derived hadrosauroids also reaching Europe, Africa, South America and Antarctica during this epoch.

== Classification ==
Originally named and described in 1986 by Paul Sereno, Ankylopollexia would receive a phylogenetic definition in a later paper by Sereno in 2005. In the 1986 paper, the groups Camptosauridae and Styracosterna were used to define the clade, but in the 2005 paper, a phylogenetic definition was given: the last common ancestor of the species Camptosaurus dispar and Parasaurolophus walkeri and all its descendants. Ankylopollexia would receive a formal PhyloCode definition as "the smallest clade containing Camptosaurus dispar and Iguanodon bernissartensis". This clade contains the two subclades Camptosauridae and Styracosterna, which are both defined using Camptosaurus dispar and Iguanodon bernissartensis, creating a node-stem triplet with Ankylopollexia.

The cladogram below follows an analysis by Sacamoto and colleagues, 2026.

- Ankylopollexia
  - Uteodon
  - - Camptosaurus
    - Styracosterna
      - Dakotadon
      - - - Theiophytalia
          - Owenodon
          - Cumnoria
        - - Iguanacolossus
          - - Lanzhousaurus
            - - - Hippodraco
                - Bolong
              - - - Ouranosaurus
                  - - - Hypselospinus
                      - Barilium
                    - - Lurdusaurus
                      - Cedrorestes
                - Hadrosauriformes
                  - - Jinzhousaurus
                    - - - Iguanodon
                        - Equijubus
                      - - Proa
                        - Fukuisaurus
                  - Hadrosauroidea
                    - - Comptonatus
                      - - Mantellisaurus
                        - Brighstoneus
                    - - Hadrosauromorpha
                      - - Kukufeldia
                        - - Xuwulong
                          - - Istiorachis
                            - Paludohadros
