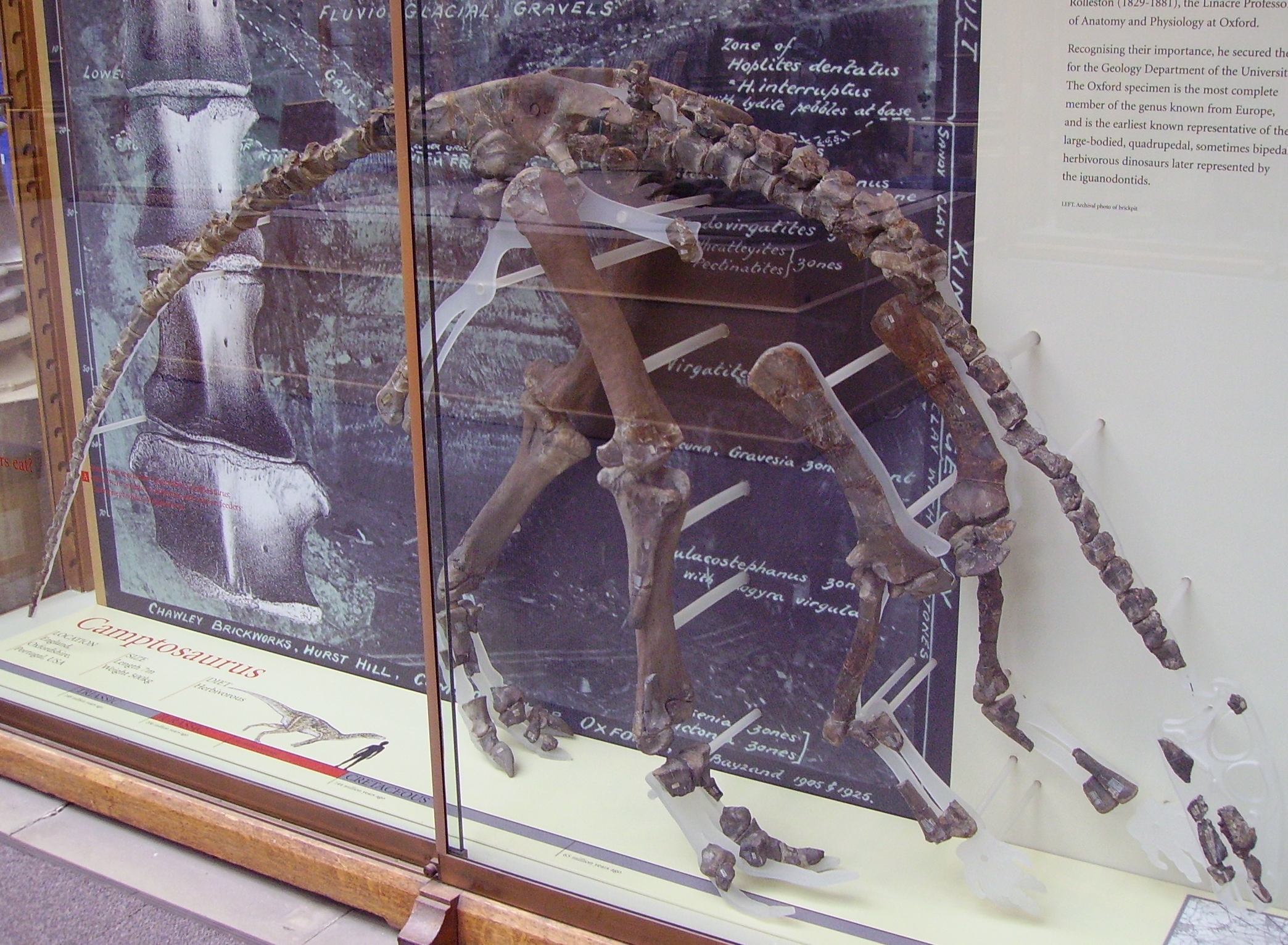
- Holotype skeleton, Oxford University Museum of Natural History

Scientific classification
- Kingdom: Animalia
- Phylum: Chordata
- Class: Reptilia
- Clade: Dinosauria
- Clade: †Ornithischia
- Clade: †Ornithopoda
- Genus: †Cumnoria; Seeley, 1888
- Species: †C. prestwichii

Binomial name
- †Cumnoria prestwichii Hulke, 1880

Synonyms
- Iguanodon prestwichii Hulke, 1880; Camptosaurus prestwichii (Hulke, 1880) Lydekker, 1889

= Cumnoria =

Cumnoria Temporal range: Kimmeridgian ~153 Ma

Extinct genus of dinosaurs

Cumnoria is a genus of basal iguanodontian dinosaur that lived during the Late Jurassic period (Kimmeridgian age) in what is now Oxfordshire, United Kingdom.

== Description ==
Size compared to a human

The holotype of Cumnoria is a rather small bipedal animal with a slender build, about 3.5–5 metres (11–16 ft) long. The specimen is a juvenile due to the general lack of fusion among all of its vertebrae and ribs. It can be distinguished from all other iguanodontians by the presence of a prominent ridge on the sternal process of the coracoid and an oval muscle scar on the front of the deltopectoral crest of the humerus. Uniquely among non-hadrosauriforms, the ventral and dorsal margins of the scapula only moderately diverge from each other, and there is no defined cingulum on the dentary teeth.

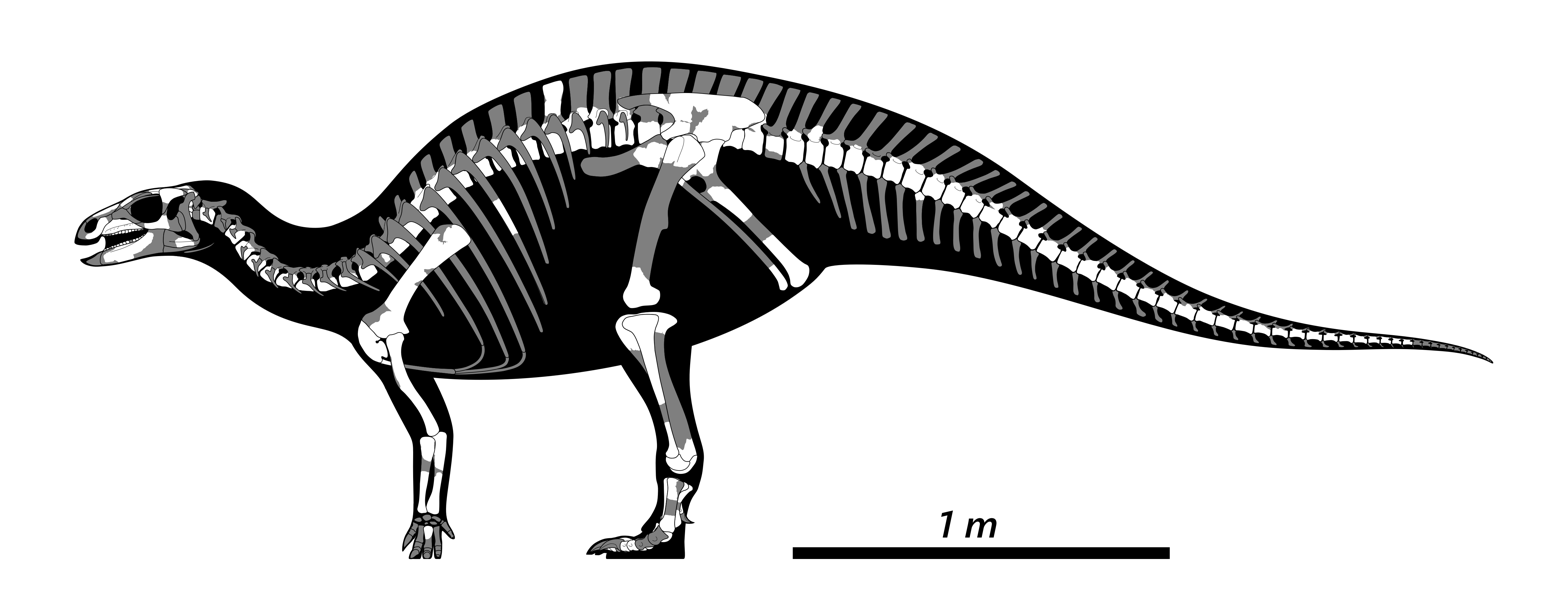
Skeletal reconstruction

== History of discovery ==
Cumnoria is known from the holotype OXFUM J.3303, a partial skull and postcranium, recovered from the lower Kimmeridge Clay Formation, in the Chawley Brick Pits, Cumnor Hurst. Workers at first discarded the remains on a dump heap, but one of them later collected the bones in a sack and showed them to Professor George Rolleston, an anatomist at the nearby Oxford University. Rolleston in turn brought them to the attention of palaeontologist Professor Joseph Prestwich who in 1879 reported them as a new species of Iguanodon, though without actually coining a species name. In 1880 Prestwich published an article on the geological stratigraphy of the find. The same year John Whitaker Hulke named the species Iguanodon prestwichii, the specific epithet honouring Prestwich.

In 1888, Harry Govier Seeley decided the taxon represented a new and separate genus which he named Cumnoria after Cumnor, the village where it was discovered. Its type species Iguanodon prestwichii was thus recombined into Cumnoria prestwichii — though Seeley spelled the epithet as prestwichi. The genus was quickly abandoned however: already in 1889 Richard Lydekker assigned the species to Camptosaurus, as Camptosaurus prestwichii. This opinion was generally accepted for over a century. In 1980 Peter Galton provided the first modern description of the species.

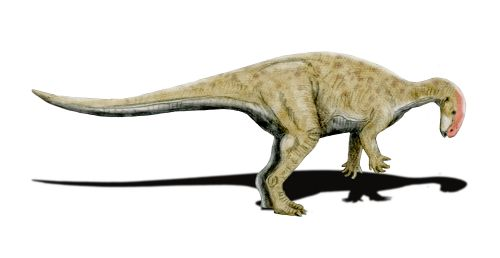
Life reconstruction

In 1998 David Norman concluded that Seeley's original generic distinction was valid. In 2008 this was supported by Darren Naish and David Martill. In 2010 and 2011 cladistic analyses by Andrew T. McDonald confirmed this by showing that Cumnoria had a separate phylogenetic position from Camptosaurus dispar. However, in 2015, Uteodon and Cumnoria were synonymized with Camptosaurus, but as distinct species. Maidment et al. (2023) considered Cumnoria to be distinct from Camptosaurus without commenting on the 2015 study.

== Classification ==
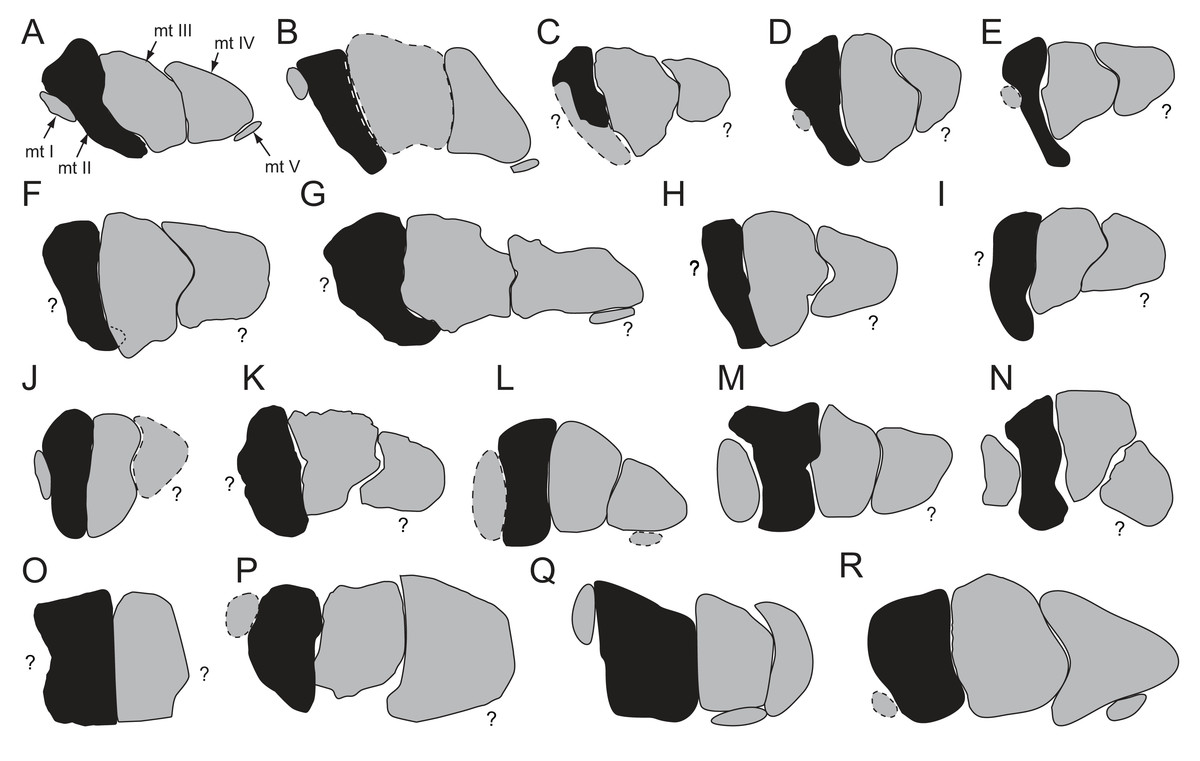
Right metatarsi of Cumnoria (N) and other ornithopods

Camptosaurus prestwichii was traditionally assigned to the Camptosauridae. In the new analyses of McDonald Cumnoria has instead been recovered as a basal member of the Styracosterna, more closely related to more derived ("advanced") iguanodontians than to Camptosaurus dispar. Cumnoria would then be the oldest known styracostern.

- Iguanodontia
  - Rhabdodontidae
  - unnamed
    - Tenontosaurus
    - Dryomorpha
      - Dryosauridae
      - Ankylopollexia
        - Camptosaurus
        - Styracosterna
          - Cumnoria
          - Uteodon
          - unnamed
            - - Hippodraco
              - Theiophytalia
            - unnamed
              - Cedrorestes
              - Dakotadon
              - Iguanacolossus
              - Lanzhousaurus
              - Hadrosauriformes
                - Iguanodon
                - Mantellisaurus
                - Ouranosaurus
                - Hadrosauroidea

Maidment et al. (2023) instead recovered Cumnoria as a non-ankylopollexian iguanodontian, as shown below. The authors note that the juvenile nature of the holotype does not affect its phylogenetic position because ornithopod datasets are generally uninfluenced by changes in growth.

- Iguanodontia
  - Rhabdodontidae
    - Rhabdodon spp
    - - Zalmoxes robustus
      - Zalmoxes shqiperorum
  - - Tenontosaurus tilletti
    - - Dryosauridae
        - Dryosaurus altus
        - - Dysalotosaurus lettowvorbecki
          - Valdosaurus canaliculatus
      - - Cumnoria prestwichii
        - Ankylopollexia
          - Camptosaurus dispar
          - - Uteodon aphanoecetes
            - - Dakotadon lakotaensis
              - - Hippodraco scutodens
                - - Iguanacolossus fortis
                  - - Proa valdearinnoensis
                    - - Lanzhousaurus magnidens
                      - - Hypselospinus fittoni
                        - - Bayannurosaurus perfectus
                          - - Ouranosaurus nigeriensis
                            - Hadrosauroidea
