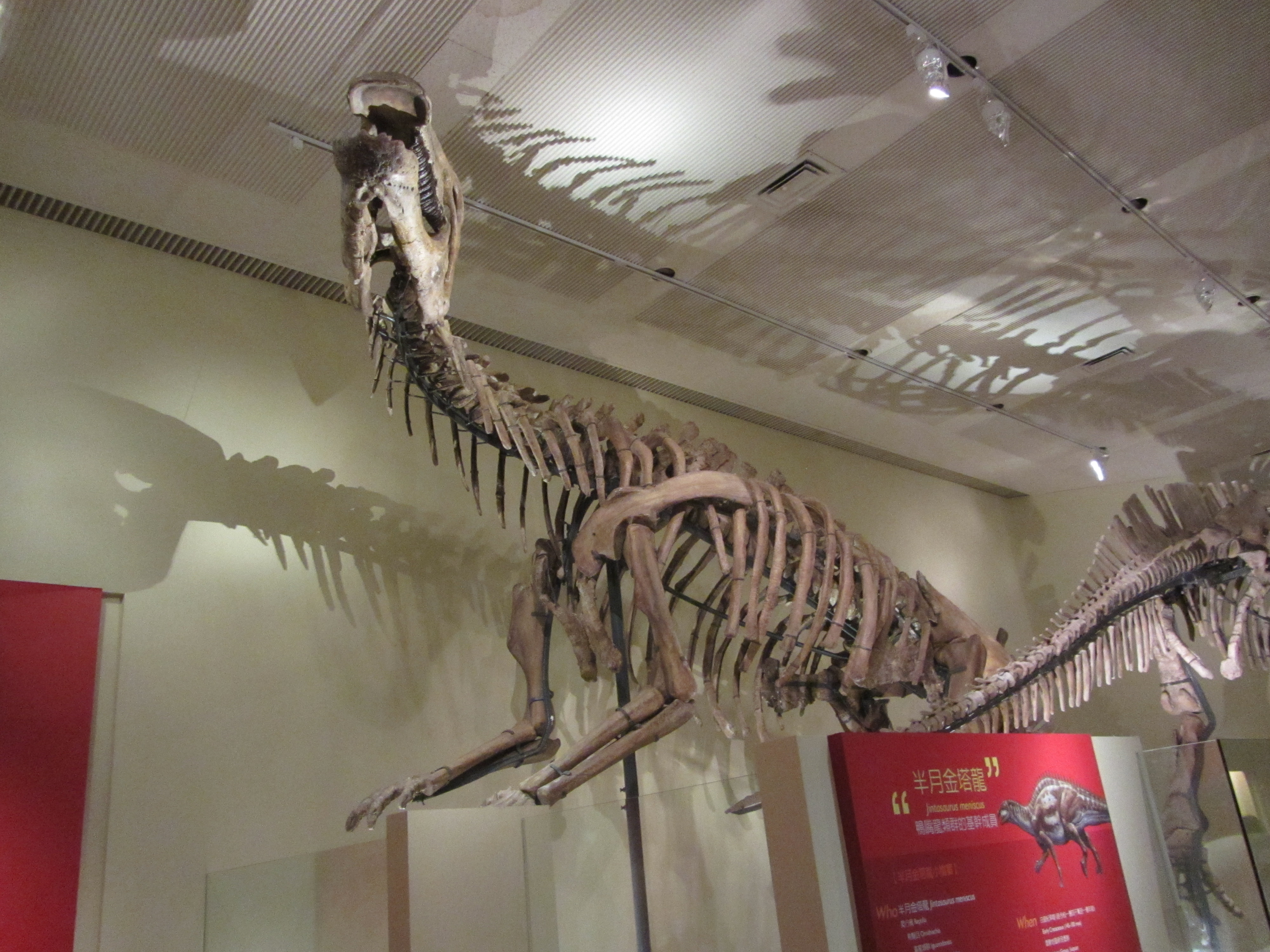
- Skeletal mount of Lanzhousaurus

Scientific classification
- Kingdom: Animalia
- Phylum: Chordata
- Class: Reptilia
- Clade: Dinosauria
- Clade: †Ornithischia
- Clade: †Ornithopoda
- Clade: †Styracosterna
- Genus: †Lanzhousaurus; You, Ji & Li, 2005

Type species
- †Lanzhousaurus magnidens You, Ji & Li, 2005

= Lanzhousaurus =

Lanzhousaurus Temporal range: Early Cretaceous, 130 Ma

Extinct genus of dinosaurs

Lanzhousaurus (meaning "Lanzhou lizard") is a genus of ornithopod dinosaur that lived in the Gansu region of what is now China during the Early Cretaceous (Barremian). Described by You, Ji, and Li in 2005, the type and only species is Lanzhousaurus magnidens, known from a partial skeleton recovered from the Hekou Group. It has been estimated to be about 10 meters (33 ft) in length and 6 metric tons (6.6 short tons) in weight.

== Dentition ==
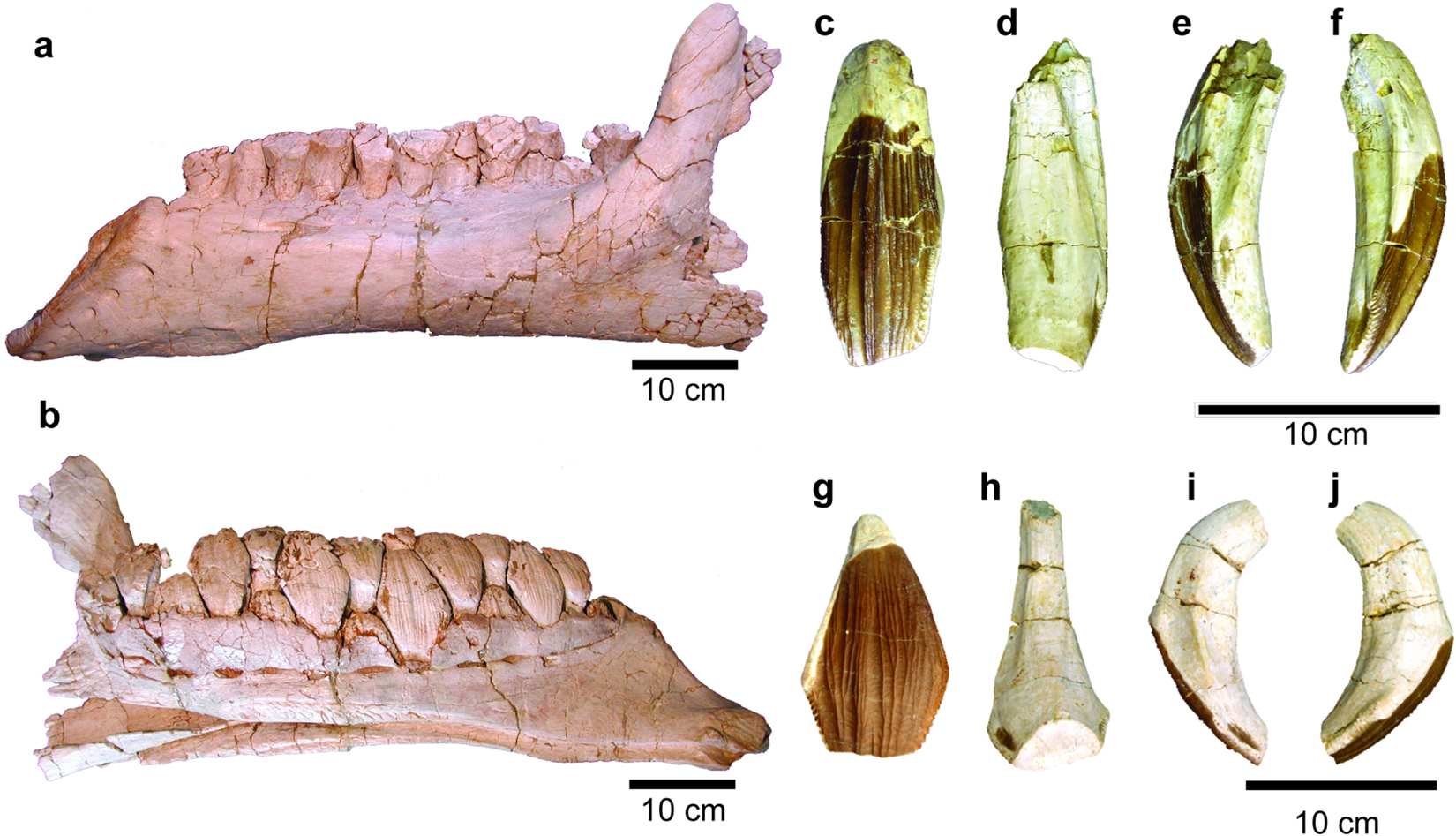
Jaw and teeth of Lanzhousaurus

The genus has been described as having "astonishingly huge teeth", among the largest for any herbivorous creature ever, which indicate it was a styracosternan iguanodont. The mandible, longer than one meter, suggests a very large size for the animal. Tooth enamel of this dinosaur was growing very rapidly.

== Classification ==
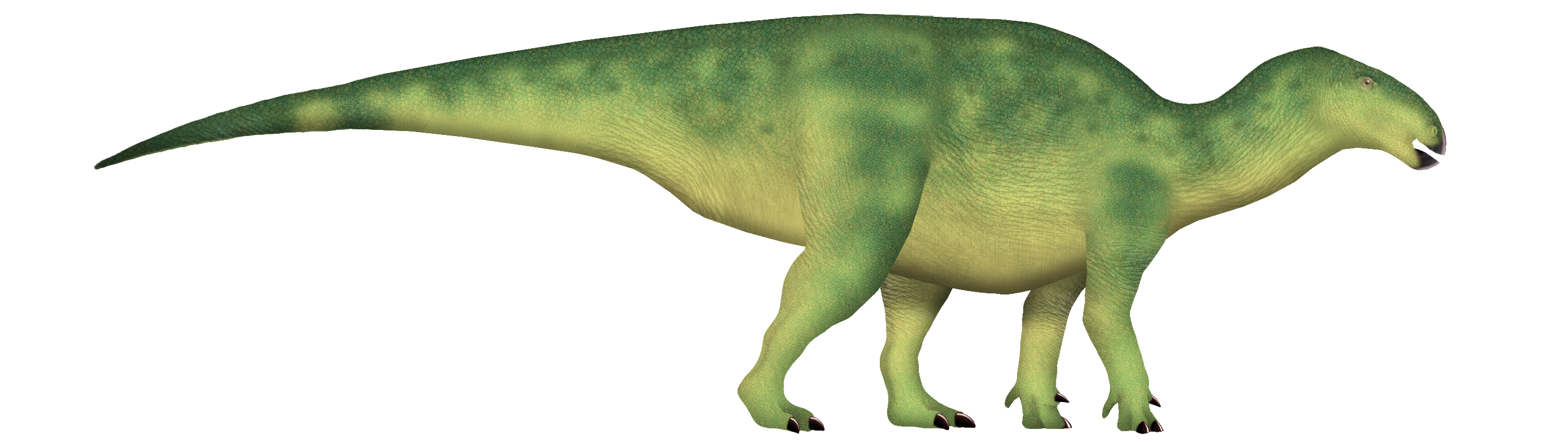
Life restoration

In their 2020 reassessment of the hadrosauromorph Orthomerus, Madzia, Jagt & Mulder ran phylogenetic analyses of Iguanodontia. In their analyses, Lanzhousaurus was recovered as a non-hadrosauriform styracosternan member of the Ankylopollexia, similar to the 2005 description by You, Ji & Li. The results of their phylogenetic analyses are shown in the cladogram below:

- Ankylopollexia
  - Camptosaurus
  - Styracosterna
    - Cumnoria
    - Uteodon
    - Draconyx
    - - Planicoxa
      - Theiophytalia
      - Hippodraco
      - Owenodon
      - Muttaburrasaurus
      - - Dakotadon
        - Osmakasaurus
        - - Cedrorestes
          - Iguanacolossus
        - - Lanzhousaurus
          - - Yunganglong
            - Fukuisaurus
            - Hadrosauriformes
              - Siamodon
              - Hypselospinus
              - Barilium
              - Lurdusaurus
              - Iguanodontidae
              - Hadrosauroidea
