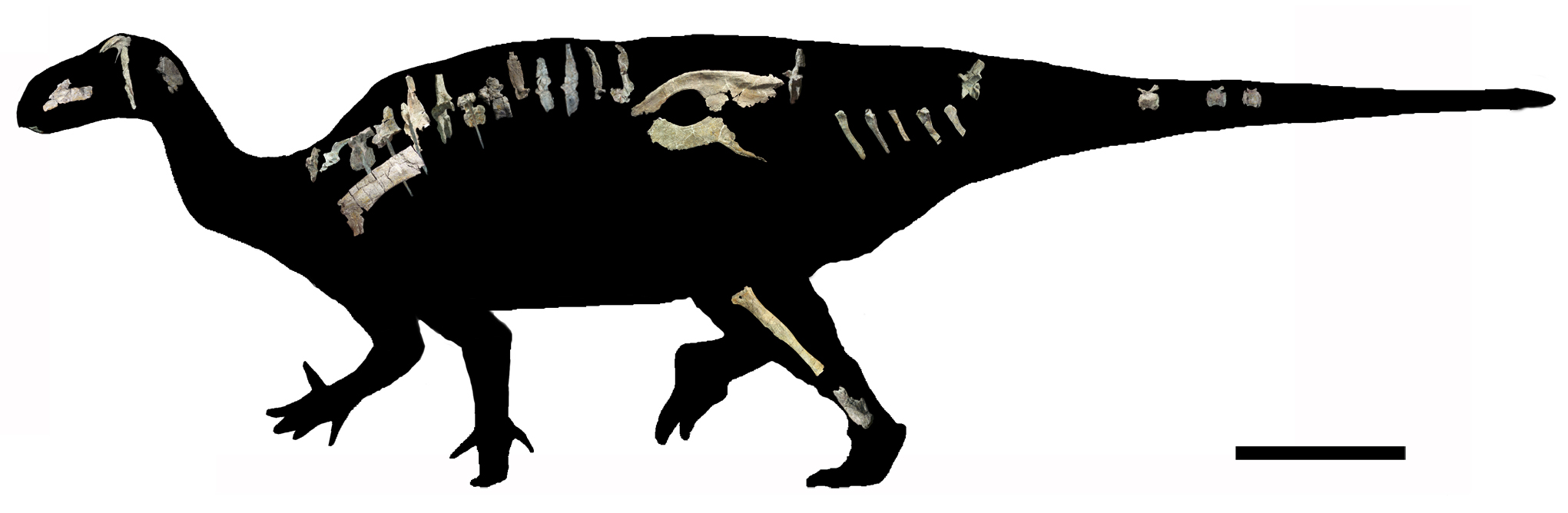
- Diagram showing the known fossil elements

Scientific classification
- Kingdom: Animalia
- Phylum: Chordata
- Class: Reptilia
- Clade: Dinosauria
- Clade: †Ornithischia
- Clade: †Ornithopoda
- Clade: †Styracosterna
- Genus: †Iguanacolossus; McDonald et al., 2010

Type species
- †Iguanacolossus fortis McDonald et al., 2010

= Iguanacolossus =

Iguanacolossus Temporal range: Lower Cretaceous, 139–134.6 Ma

Extinct genus of dinosaurs

Iguanacolossus (meaning "iguana colossus" or "colossal iguana") is a genus of iguanodontian ornithopod dinosaur that lived in North America during the Early Cretaceous period. It is known from UMNH VP 20205, the associated holotype with a large partial skeleton of a single individual.

== Discovery and naming ==
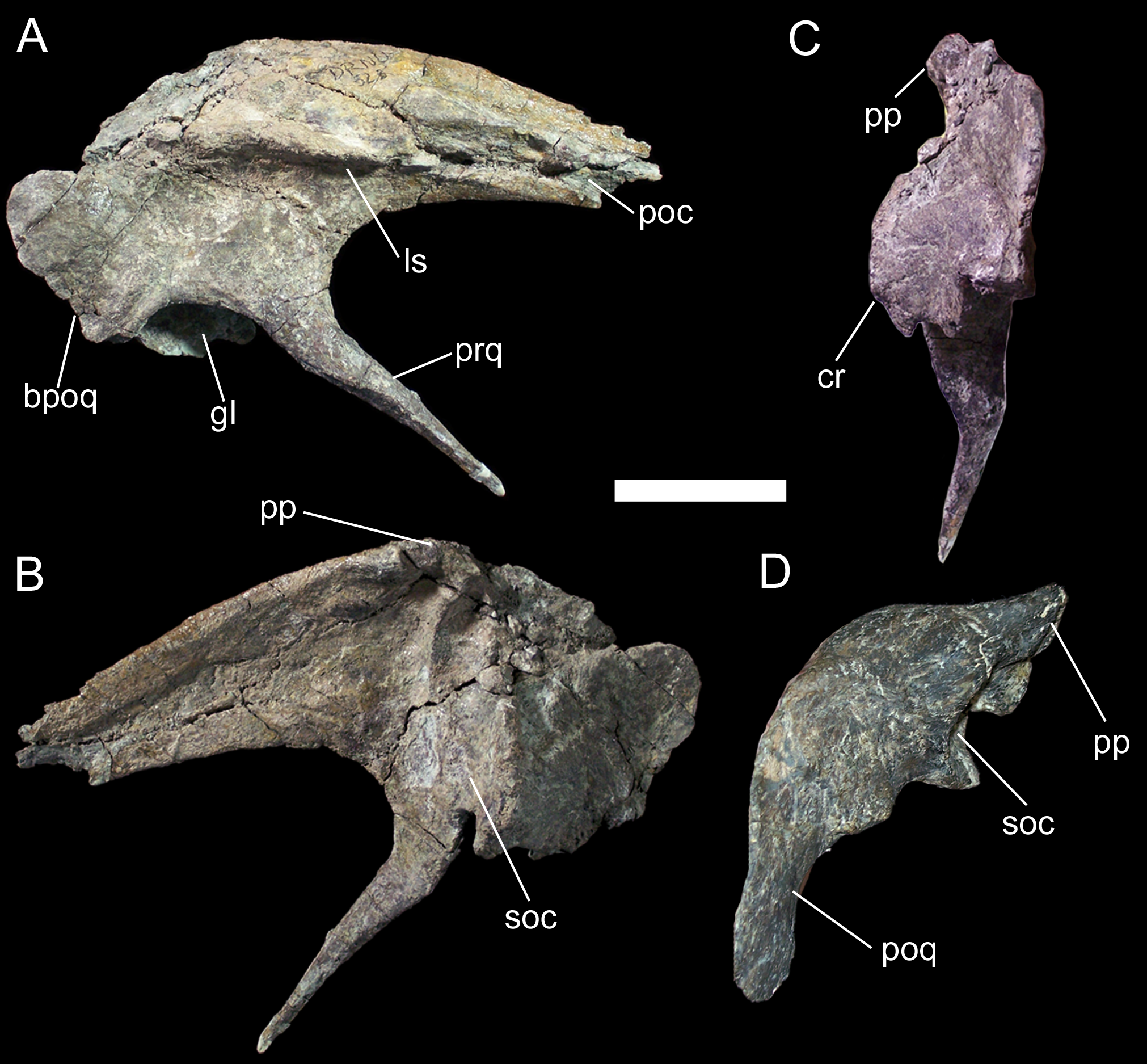
Right squamosal of UMNH VP 20205

The holotype of Iguanacolossus, UMNH VP 20205, was discovered by Donald D. DeBlieux in 2005, unearthed from the Yellow Cat Member of the Cedar Mountain Formation, Utah; dating from the Valanginian stage in the Early Cretaceous, it wasn't named and described until 2010 by Andrew T. McDonald, James I. Kirkland, Donald D. DeBlieux, Scott K. Madsen, Jennifer Cavin, Andrew R. C. Milner, and Lukas Panzarin, along with the genus Hippodraco, also from the Cedar Mountain Formation. UMNH VP 20205 is assigned to a single individual, including skull elements: fragmented predentary, partial right maxilla, right squamosal, teeth, right and left quadrates. Body remains compromise: vertebrae (cervical, dorsal and caudal), chevrons, ribs, right scapula, right ilium, right pubis, right metatarsals and left fibula. The generic name, Iguanacolossus, is a combination of the reptile genus "Iguana", and the Latin word "colossus" (meaning colossal and/or giant) in relation to the iconic Iguana-like teeth of iguanodontians and the notorious large body size of the specimen. The specific name, "fortis", means mighty. The binomial means "Mighty Iguana Colossus". Additional findings at the Doelling's Bowl site are currently on revision, compromising mostly juvenile material based on lower jaws and humerus. Other remains include a large femur and pubis.

== Description ==
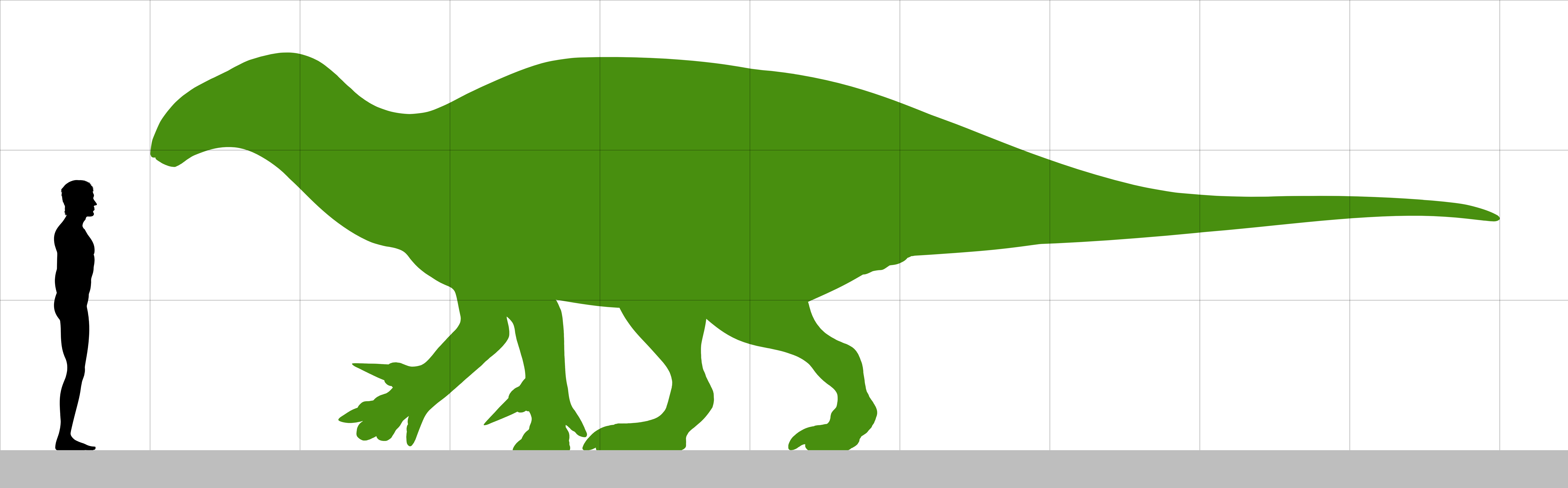
Estimated size of Iguanacolossus

Iguanacolossus is a large, robust iguanodontid, probably reaching 9 m (30 ft) long and weighing 5 t (11,000 lb) in body mass. According to McDonald and colleagues, Iguanacolossus differs from other iguanodontians in having a contact surface for supraoccipital on caudomedial process of squamosal curved in caudal view, cranial pubic process with concave dorsal margin but little expansion of its cranial end, postorbital process of the squamosal mediolaterally compressed and blade-like, pubis tapers to a blunt point, cranial extremity of preacetabular process of ilium modified into horizontal boot, axial neural spine blade-like and semi-circular in profile, and the dorsal margin of ilium straight.

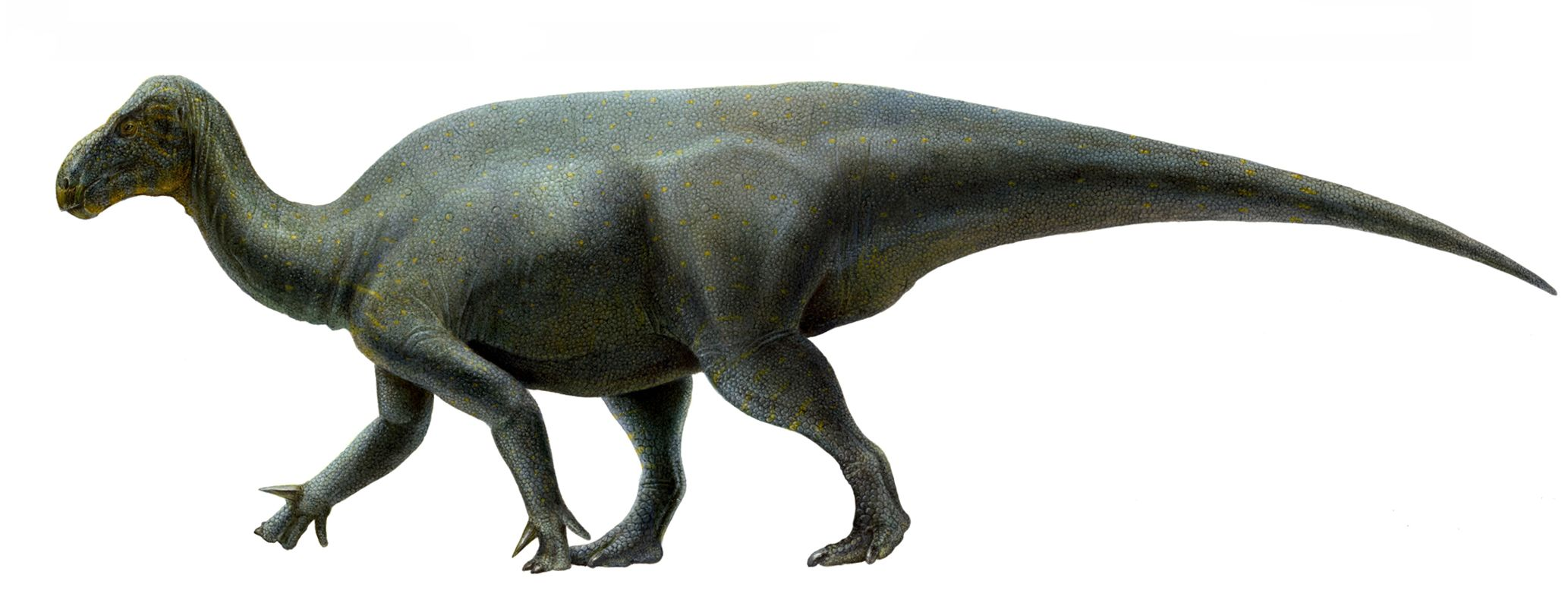
Life restoration

It had stock metatarsals and a prominent left fibula measuring 63.0 cm (24.8 in). The maxilla preserves 14 alveoli, the presence of two concave surfaces suggest an elliptical and elongate antorbital fossa. Based on comparisons with Camptosaurus and Dakotadon, the two isolated teeth are clasiffied as dentary and maxillary, having a shield-shaped crown and lozenge-shaped crown respectively. The scapular bone is almost complete; a denticle is preserved on the predentary, various vertebrae indicate a very iguanodontian-like body shape, specially dorsal vertebrae. The two right metatarsals are classified as metatarsals III and IV based on Camptosaurus and Iguanodon. The right pubis shows derived and plesiomorphic features, seen on related iguanodontians.

== Classification ==
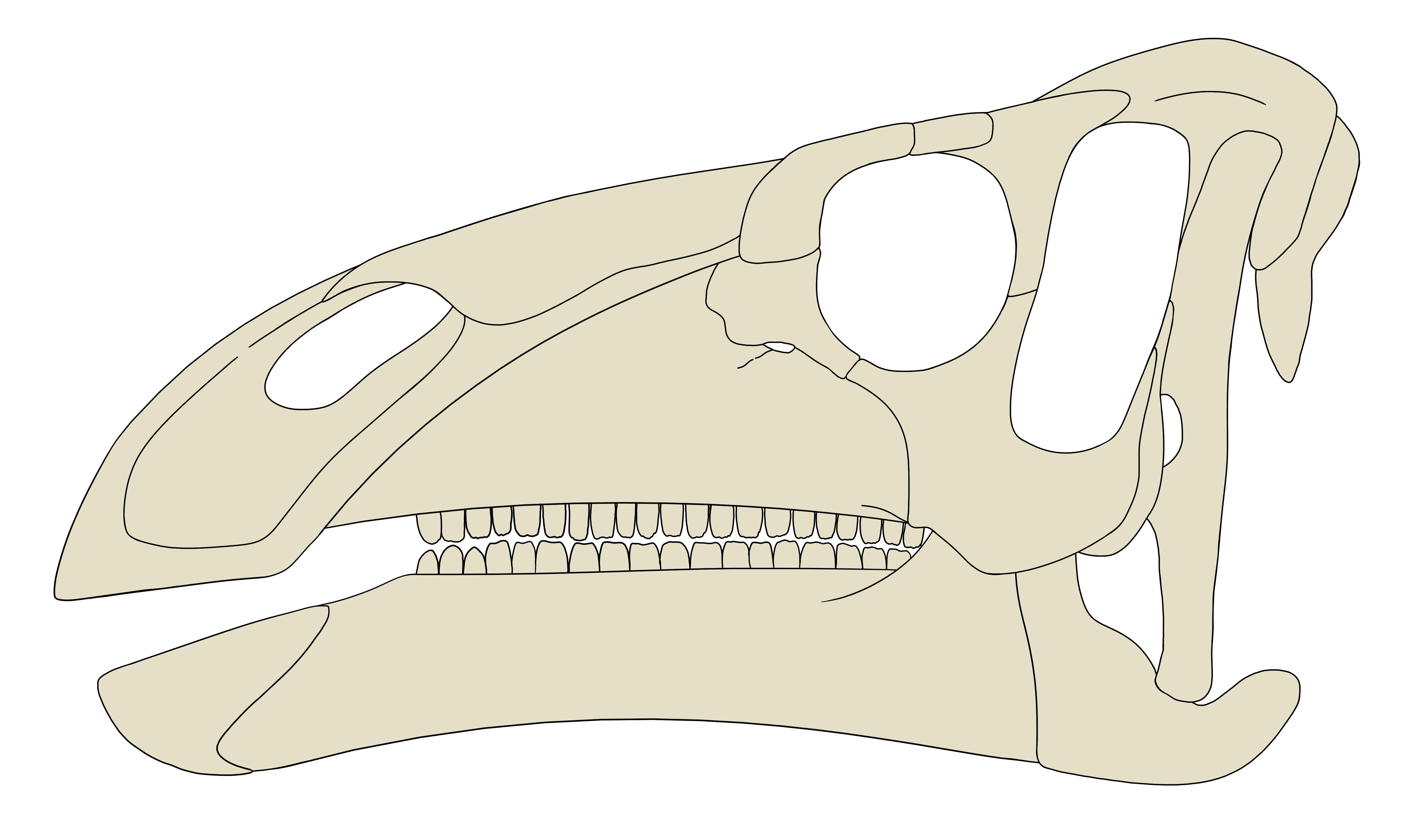
Reconstructed skull

Iguanacolossus was placed in the Iguanodontia, being a styracosternan, a basal subgroup containing the Hadrosauridae and all dinosaurs more closely related to hadrosaurids than to camptosaurids. Below are the results obtained in the phylogenetic analysis performed by its describers in 2010:

- Ankylopollexia
  - Camptosaurus dispar
  - Styracosterna
    - - Cumnoria
      - Uteodon
      - - - Hippodraco
          - Theiophytalia
        - - Cedrorestes
          - Dakotadon
          - Iguanacolossus
          - Lanzhousaurus
          - Hadrosauriformes

== Paleoecology ==
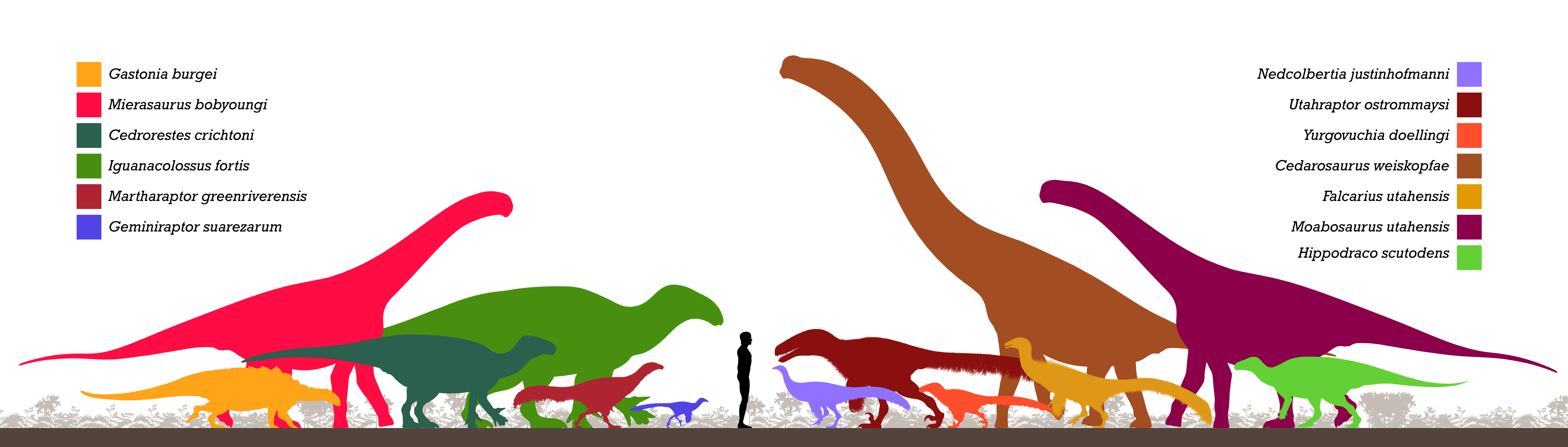
Iguanacolossus compared to the fauna of the Yellow Cat Member from the Cedar Mountain Formation (Iguanacolossus in green)

Iguanacolossus was recovered in the Yellow Cat Member from the Cedar Mountain Formation. However, this Member is divided in two beds: Upper and Lower Yellow Cat; Iguanacolossus was unearthed from the Lower bed, where it shared its environment with the theropods Falcarius, Geminiraptor and Yurgovuchia, the sauropod Mierasaurus and the turtle Naomichelys. There are also indeterminate goniopholidids known from the Lower Yellow Cat.

The other paleofauna is from the Upper Yellow Cat, which includes such dinosaur genera as the sauropods Cedarosaurus and Moabosaurus, the fellow iguanodontians Cedrorestes and Hippodraco, the theropods Martharaptor and Utahraptor (as well as the avian ichnogenus Aquatilavipes), and the nodosaurid Gastonia. Other vertebrate genera include the turtles Glyptops and Trinitichelys, the fish Ceratodus and Semionotus, and the mammal Cifelliodon. Additional unnamed species are known from this bed: a sail-backed iguanodont, a eudromaeosaur and velociraptorine, goniopholidids, mesoeucrocodylians, a neochoristodere, and hybodontid and polyacrodontid sharks.

== See also ==
- 2010 in paleontology
- Ornithopoda
- Cedar Mountain Formation
