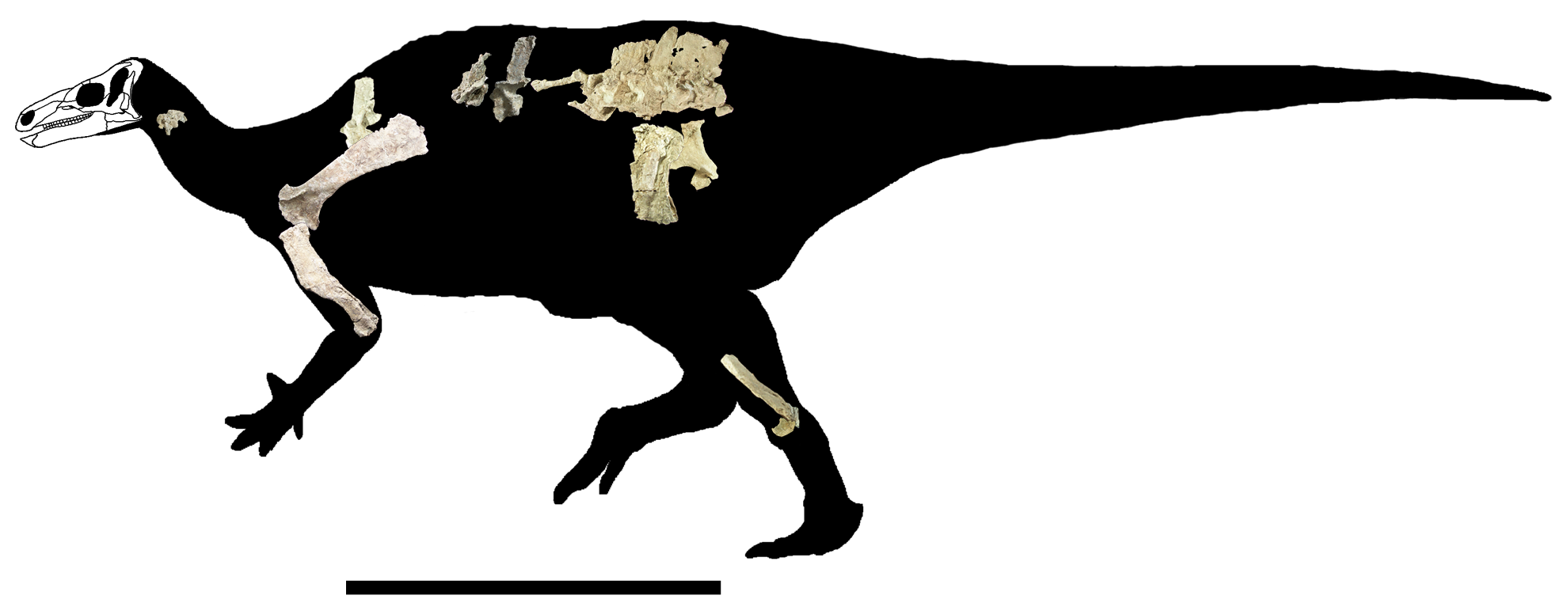
- Diagram showing known elements of the holotype specimen

Scientific classification
- Kingdom: Animalia
- Phylum: Chordata
- Class: Reptilia
- Clade: Dinosauria
- Clade: †Ornithischia
- Clade: †Ornithopoda
- Clade: †Styracosterna
- Genus: †Hippodraco; McDonald et al., 2010

Type species
- †Hippodraco scutodens McDonald et al., 2010

= Hippodraco =

Hippodraco Temporal range: Early Cretaceous, 139–134.6 Ma

Extinct genus of dinosaurs

Hippodraco is a genus of iguanodontian ornithopod dinosaur from the Early Cretaceous Cedar Mountain Formation of Utah, United States. The genus contains a single species, H. scutodens, known from a partial skeleton belonging to an immature individual.

== Discovery ==
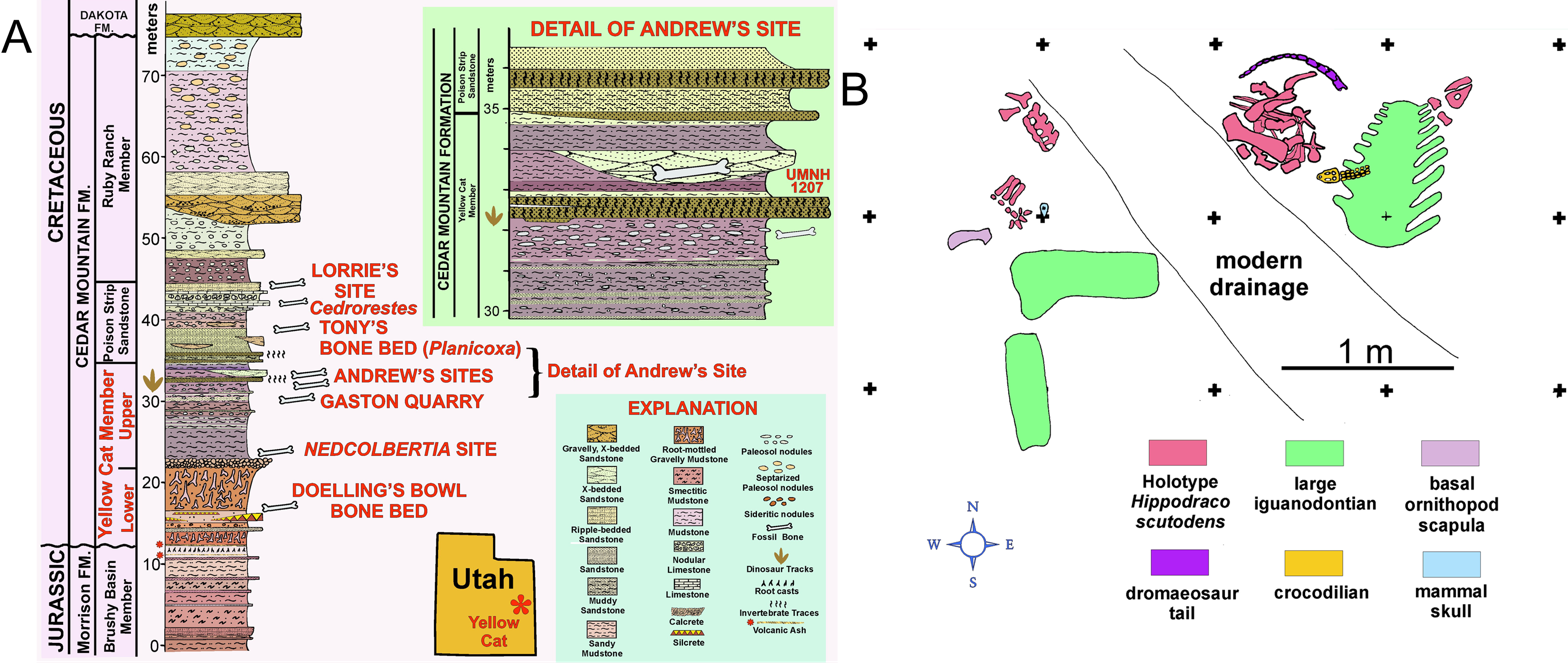
Stratigraphy and taphonomy of the type locality, with quarry map (B)

The holotype of Hippodraco, UMNH VP 20208, was discovered in 2004 by Andrew R. C. Milner. It is a fragmentary specimen including a fragmented skull and dentary teeth, vertebrae (dorsal, caudal and cervical), a right humerus, a right scapula, a left ischium, a right tibia, a right femur, and left metatarsals.

It was later named in 2010 by Andrew T. McDonald, James I. Kirkland, Andrew R. C. Milner, Scott K. Madsen, Donald D. DeBlieux, Jennifer Cavin and Lukas Panzarin. The generic name Hippodraco is a combination of the Greek word hippos ("horse") and the Latin word draco ("dragon"). It refers to the elongated shape of the skull, which resembles a horse skull. The specific name scutodens is a combination of the Latin words scutum (meaning shield) and dens (meaning tooth), and it references the shield-shaped dentary tooth crowns. UMNH VP 20208 was unearthed from the Yellow Cat Member of the Cedar Mountain Formation, Utah, at a site known as Andrew's Site, dating from the Valanginian stage in the Early Cretaceous period.

== Description ==
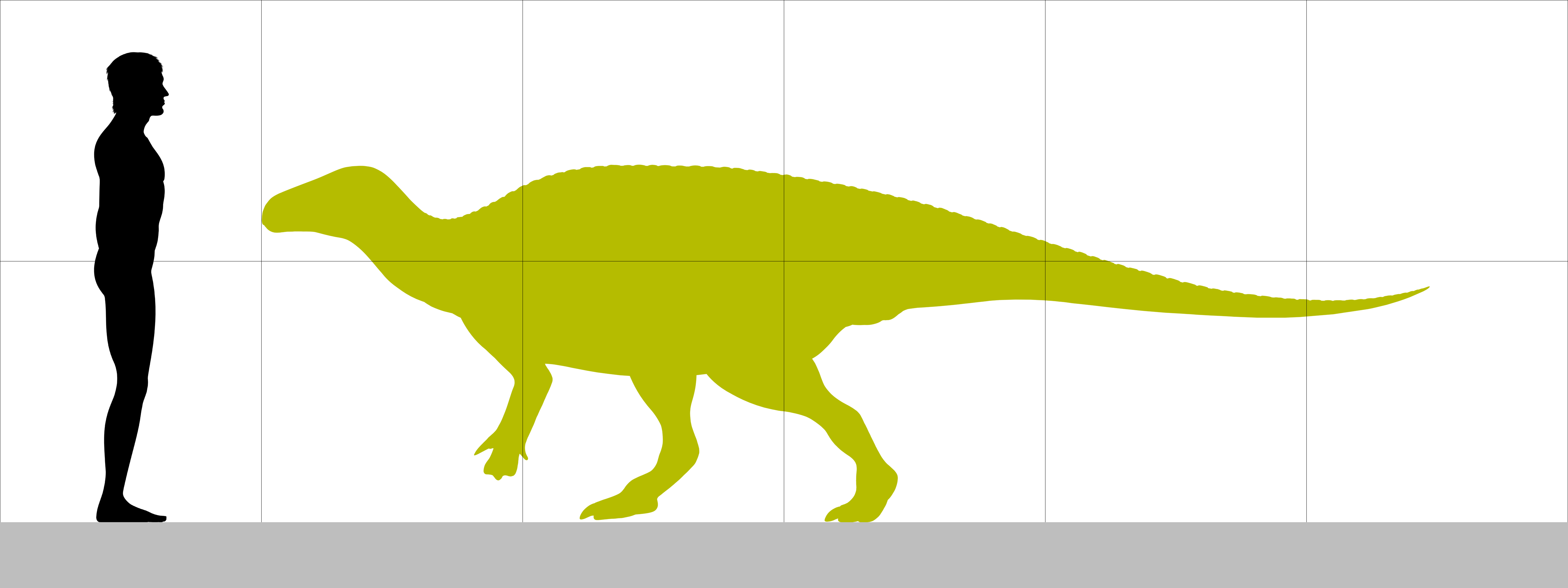
Size compared to a human

Hippodraco is a relatively small iguanodontid, with the holotype reaching 4.5 m (15 ft) in length. Holtz estimated its weight between 227 to 454 kg (500.4 to 1,000.9 lb). However, a large orbital in the skull indicates that the specimen is immature. The left side of the skull is well preserved, although the right side is very fragmented. The left dentary is preserved on the skull along with teeth, which, have shield-shaped crowns. The lacrimal bone closely resembles those of Dakotadon and Theiophytalia.

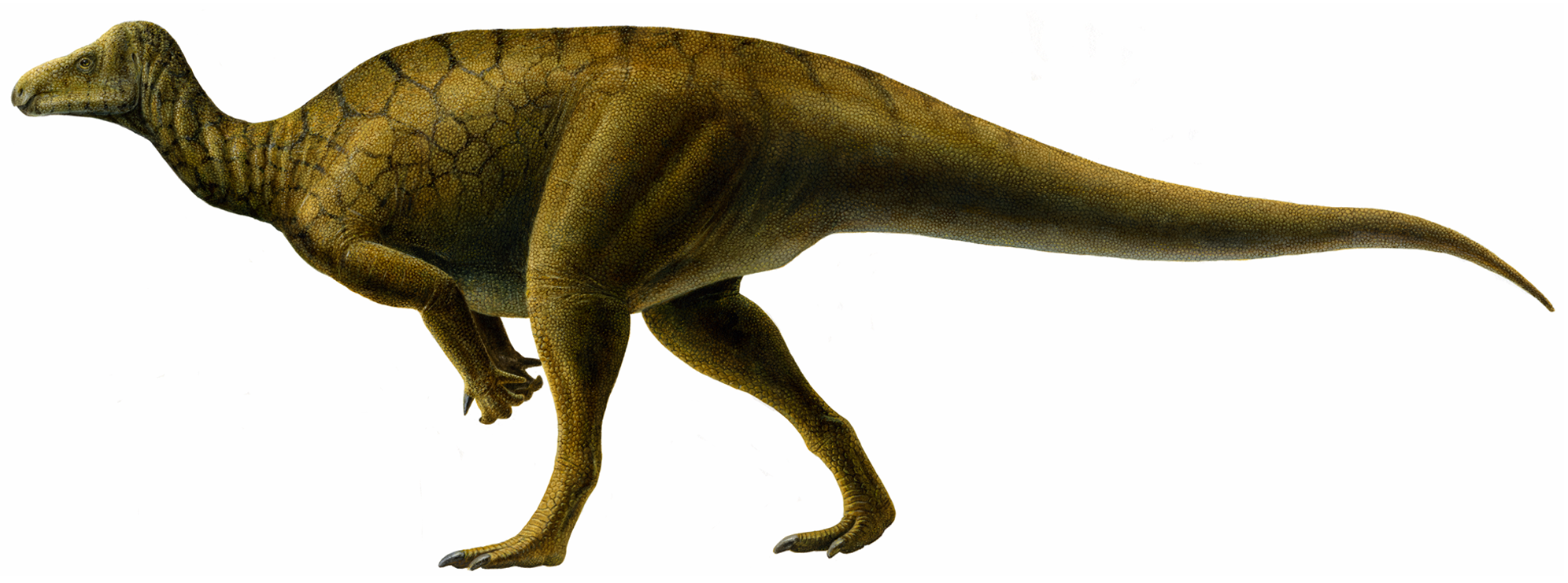
Life restoration

Vertebrae indicates a characteristic iguanodont body shape. Most of the body remains are gracile, such as the right humerus and scapula, the right tibia and femur are fragmented, having irregular surfaces. The nearly-complete metatarsus is very similar to those of Camptosaurus and Iguanodon.

== Classification ==
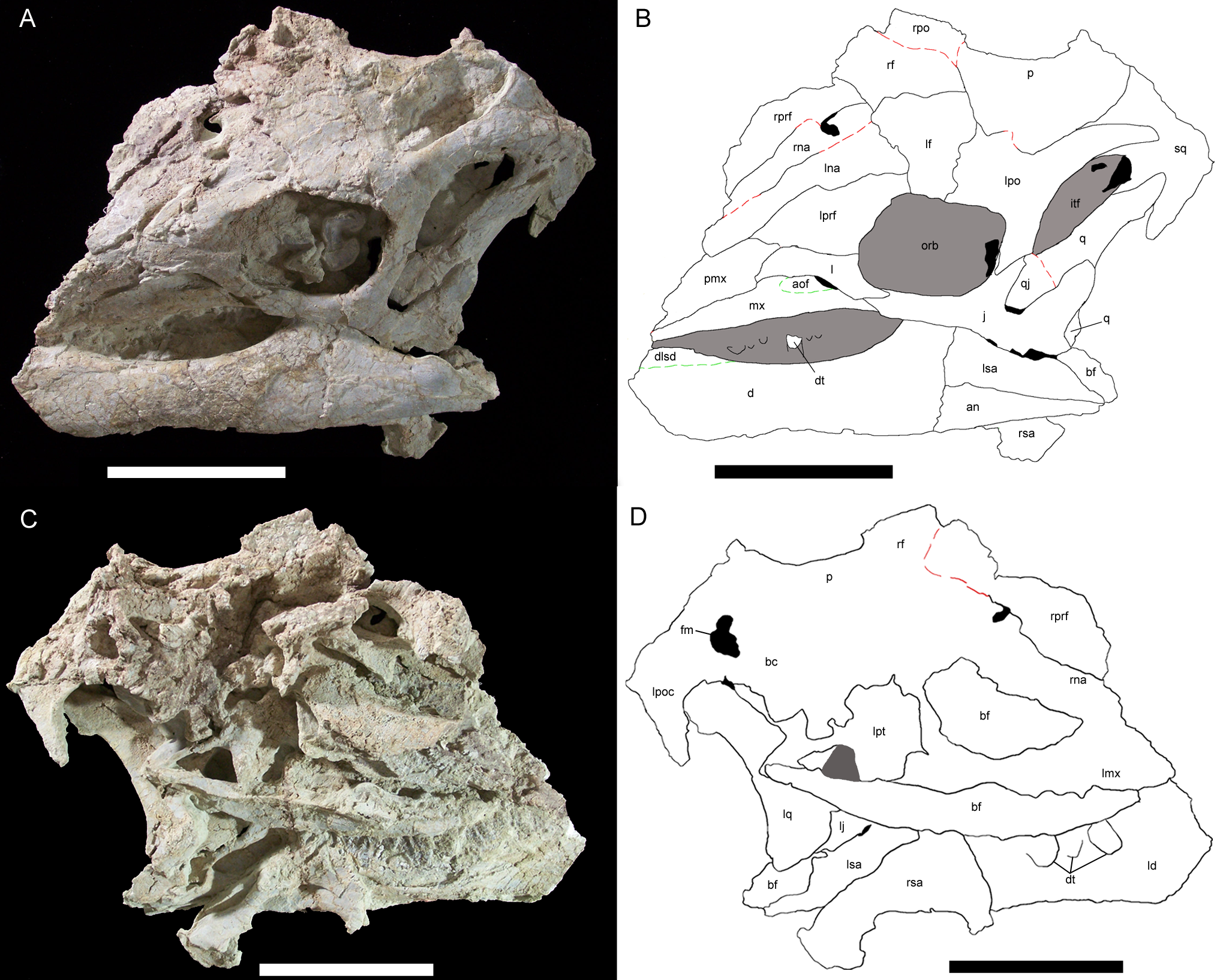
Partial skull in left and medial view

In 2010 and 2011 cladistic analyses of McDonald and colleagues, Hippodraco has been recovered as a basal member of the Styracosterna and its closest relative was Theiophytalia.

- Ankylopollexia
  - Camptosaurus
  - Styracosterna
    - Uteodon
    - - - Hippodraco
        - Theiophytalia
      - - Iguanacolossus
        - - Lanzhousaurus
          - - Kukufeldia
            - - Barilium
              - Hadrosauriformes

== Paleoenvironment ==
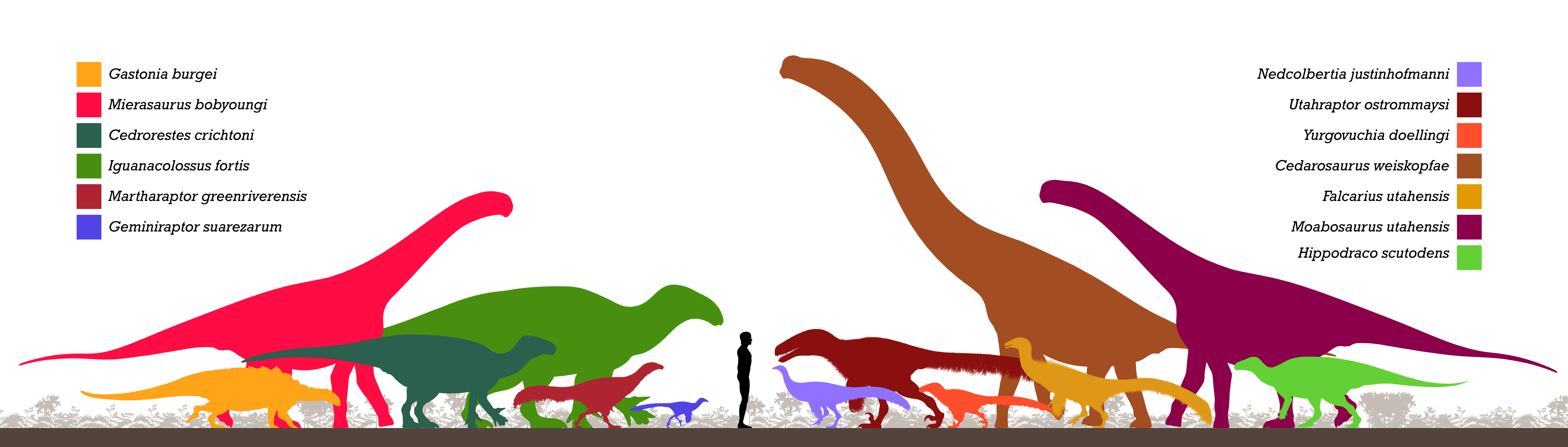
Hippodraco (lime-yellow, right) and other fauna from the Yellow Cat Member of the Cedar Mountain Formation

The holotype of Hippodraco was unearthed from the Upper Yellow Cat Member of the Cedar Mountain Formation. Contemporaneous fauna from the Upper Yellow Cat include the fellow ornithopod Cedrorestes, sauropods (Cedarosaurus and Moabosaurus), theropods (Martharaptor and Nedcolbertia), the nodosaurid Gastonia, and the giant dromaeosaurid Utahraptor. Other dromaeosaurids with fragmentary remains are also known from the formation: an indeterminate eudromaeosaur (UMNH VP 20209) and an indeterminate velociraptorine (UMNH VP 21752).
