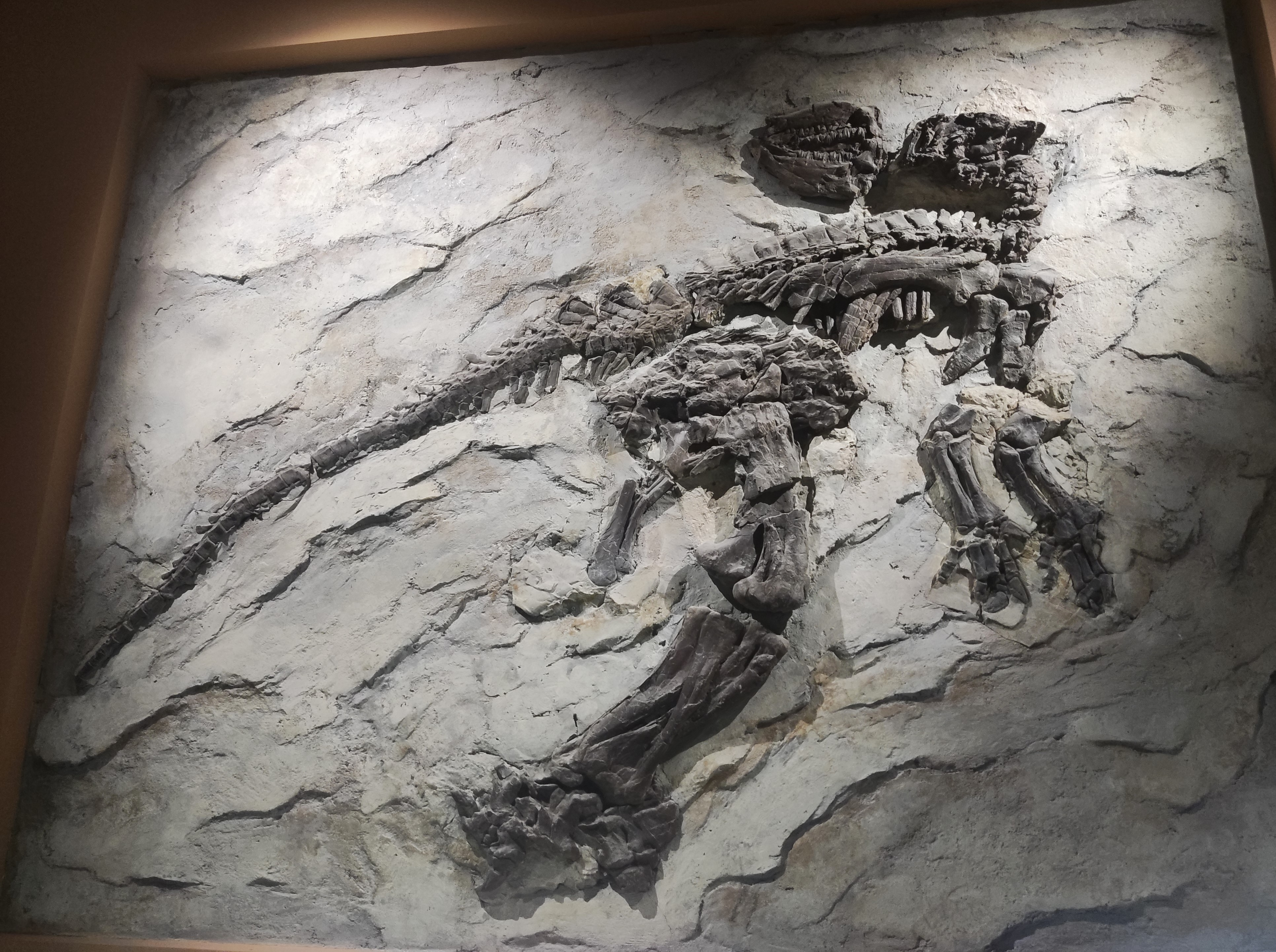
- Fossil in Liaoning Palaeontological Museum

Scientific classification
- Kingdom: Animalia
- Phylum: Chordata
- Class: Reptilia
- Clade: Dinosauria
- Clade: †Ornithischia
- Clade: †Ornithopoda
- Clade: †Hadrosauriformes
- Superfamily: †Hadrosauroidea
- Genus: †Bolong; Wu, Godefroit & Hu, 2010
- Species: †B. yixianensis

Binomial name
- †Bolong yixianensis Wu, Godefroit & Hu, 2010

= Bolong =

Bolong Temporal range: Early Cretaceous, 125.46 Ma

Genus of reptiles (fossil)

Bolong (meaning "Bo's dragon") is a genus of iguanodontian dinosaur known from the Early Cretaceous Yixian Formation of western Liaoning Province, China. It lived about 125 million years ago in the earliest Barremian.

== Discovery and naming ==
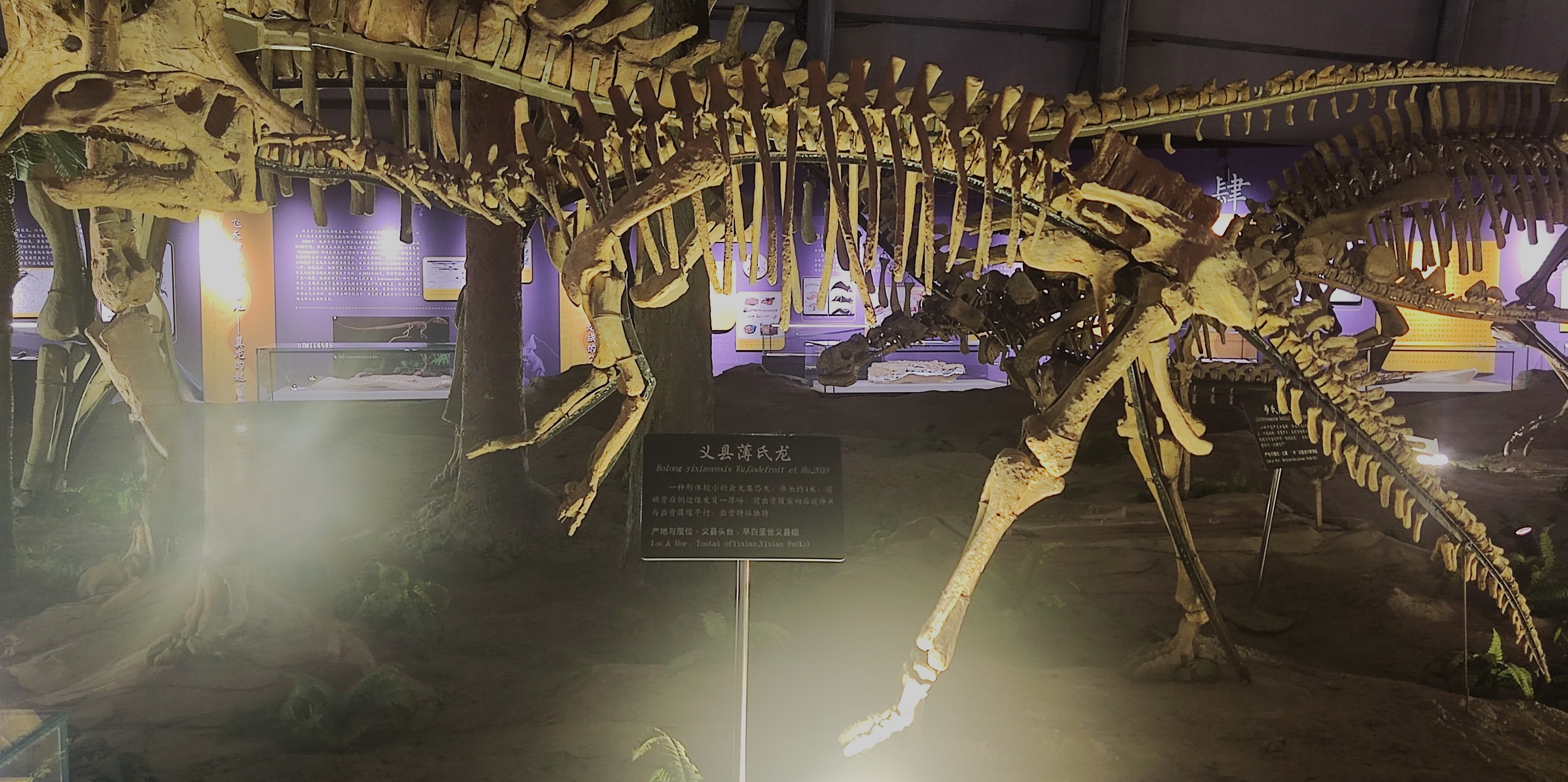
Reconstructed skeleton

It was named by Wu Wen-hao, Pascal Godefroit and Hu Dong-yu in 2010. The type species is Bolong yixianensis. The genus name is derived from the names of the brothers Bo Hai-chen and Bo Xue, who helped uncover it, and the Mandarin word 龍 lóng "dragon". The specific epithet refers to the Yixian Formation where it was found.

The holotype fossil, YHZ-001, consists of a nearly complete skeleton.

In 2013 a second specimen (ZMNH-M8812) was described consisting of an almost complete skeleton of a very young animal. It was found by a farmer near the village of Xitaizhi in Inner Mongolia.

== Description ==
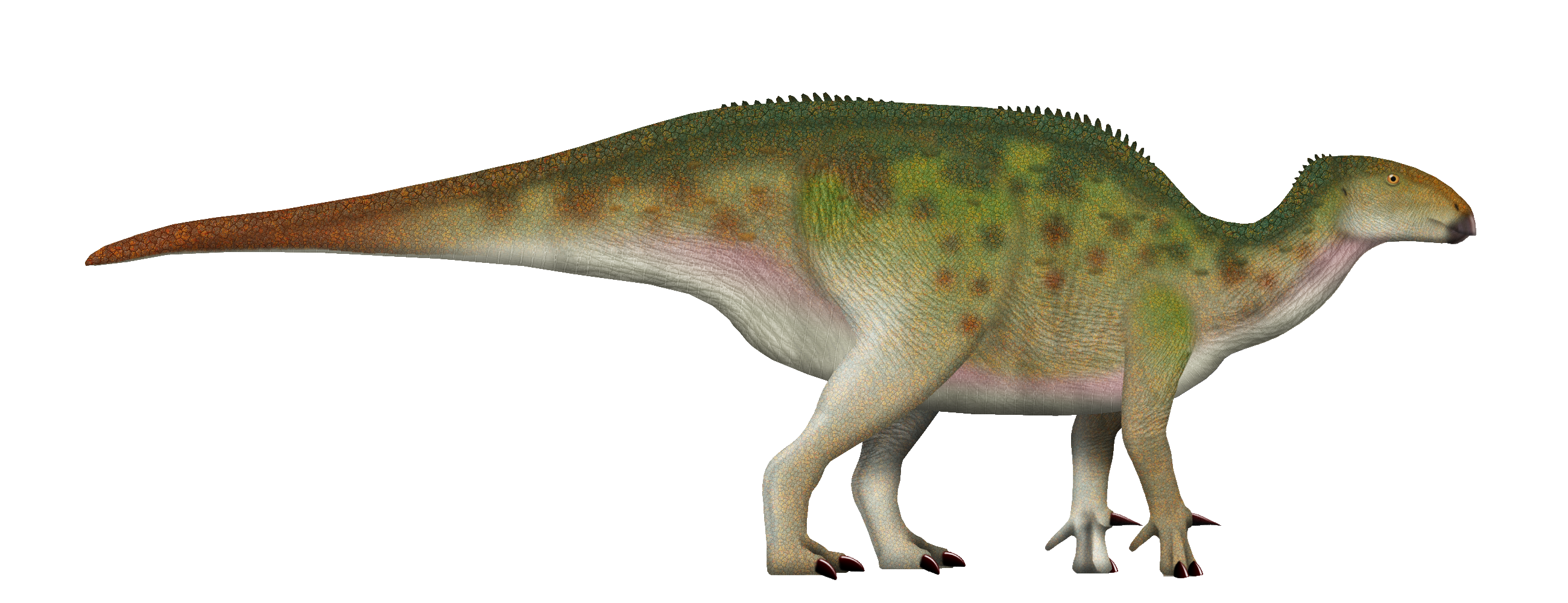
Life restoration

Bolong was a relatively small animal with an estimated length of 4 metres (13 ft) and a weight of 200 kilograms (440 lb). The head is convex and fairly stocky with powerful mandibles. The teeth are relatively large. Autapomorphies that have been established are a cavity at the interface of the lacrimal bone, the maxilla, the backwards branch of the prefrontal bone, consisting of a front-to-rear depth cavity above the edges of the eye socket, the lower protrusion of the predentarium extending rearwardly parallel to the lower edge, the interface of the predentarium that occupies less than two-thirds of the height of the dentarium so that the front tip of the dentarium protrudes a third above the predentarium, and that the teeth in the maxilla have dental crowns of which the main ridge bends at the tip of the tooth.

A second autapomorphy was identified based on the second specimen: the inside of the maxillary teeth are thickened and enclosed from the front and rear cutting edges and is divided in half by a striking vertical ledge.

The gait of Bolong is disputed. The forelimb was fairly short, and the wrist bones were not fused together, suggesting that the forelimb was not well-adapted to bearing much weight, though the proportions of the distal forelimb are reminiscent of quadrupeds. This suggests that Bolong was a facultative quadruped that spent much of its time walking bipedally, which is also suggested by the relative proportions of the thigh and shin. However, the hind foot was short and robust, more like fully quadrupedal dinosaurs than bipedal ones. Very young individuals had a proportionally longer forelimb, typical of the proportions of quadrupedal animals.

== Phylogeny ==
The describers placed Bolong in Hadrosauroidea. It would have been one of the basalmost hadrosauroids found in Asia.
