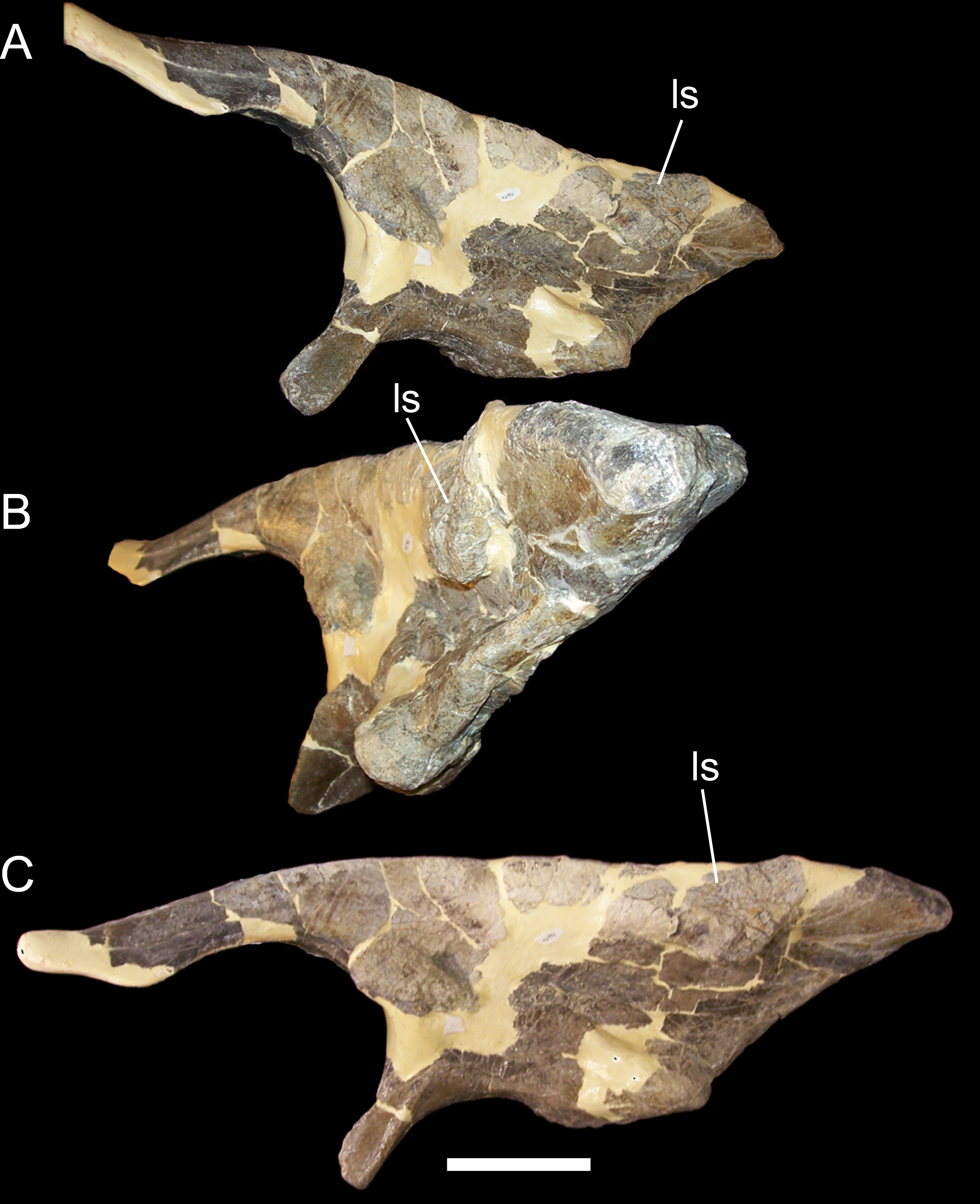
- Left ilium

Scientific classification
- Domain: Eukaryota
- Kingdom: Animalia
- Phylum: Chordata
- Clade: Dinosauria
- Clade: †Ornithischia
- Clade: †Ornithopoda
- Clade: †Ankylopollexia
- Clade: †Styracosterna
- Genus: †Cedrorestes; Gilpin et al., 2007
- Species: †C. crichtoni

Binomial name
- †Cedrorestes crichtoni Gilpin et al., 2007

= Cedrorestes =

Cedrorestes Temporal range: Early Cretaceous, Valanginian

Extinct genus of dinosaurs

Cedrorestes is a genus of iguanodontian dinosaur from the Early Cretaceous of Utah. It is based on an incomplete skeleton which was found in the Valanginian-age Yellow Cat Member of the Cedar Mountain Formation.

== Discovery and history ==
Cedrorestes is based on DMNH 47994, a partial skeleton including rib fragments, a sacrum, the left ilium and a portion of the right, a right thighbone, the right third metatarsal, and fragments of ossified tendons. These remains were in 2001 recovered from near the top of the Yellow Cat Member of the Cedar Mountain Formation, in east-central Utah. They were found scattered in a calcareous mudstone, and showed evidence of pre-burial damage, from weathering or trampling.

This genus can be told apart from other iguanodontian ornithopods by its combination of a tall ilium, as is present in Iguanodon-like ornithopods, with a large lateral bony process above and behind the acetabulum and joint surface for the ischium, as is seen in hadrosaurids. David Gilpin and his coauthors, who described the specimen, noted that the lateral process has been considered diagnostic for hadrosaurids, and interpreted the combination of anatomical characteristics in Cedrorestes as evidence that the genus was close to the division between hadrosaurids and iguanodontids. They placed their new genus in Hadrosauridae, as the earliest known hadrosaurid.

The etymology of the generic name is, from Latin, cedrus (cedr-); "cedar" + Greek oros-; "mountain", after the Cedar Mountain formation, where the fossil was found + Greek suffix ending -etes; "dweller". The specific epithet crichtoni is after Michael Crichton, author of Jurassic Park and The Lost World. Other dinosaurs named after M.Crichton are the Chinese Crichtonsaurus and Crichtonpelta.

== Paleoecology and paleobiology ==
The Yellow Cat Member of the Cedar Mountain Formation is commonly sub-divided into "lower" and "upper" layers, with distinct fauna being found within each. The Upper Yellow Cat Member, where Cedrorestes was found, also contains the fossils of several other dinosaur species, including the ornithopod Hippodraco, an as-yet-unnamed species of sail-backed iguanodontid, the armored dinosaur Gastonia, the brachiosaurid sauropod Cedarosaurus, the turiasaurian sauropod Moabosaurus, the primitive ornithomimosaur Nedcolbertia, the theropod Martharaptor (which might either be a therizinosaur or an oviraptorosaur), and the large dromaeosaurid Utahraptor.

Whether a basal hadrosaurid or derived non-hadrosaurid iguanodontian, Cedrorestes would have been a large herbivore capable of moving both bipedally or on all fours. The structure of its hip indicates that it had hadrosaurid-like leg muscles, but the functional significance of the changes in leg muscles from the iguanodontian layout to the hadrosaurid layout, and resulting differences in movement (if any), are not yet understood. Detailed interpretations of the paleobiology of Cedrorestes must wait for the discovery of more extensive remains.
