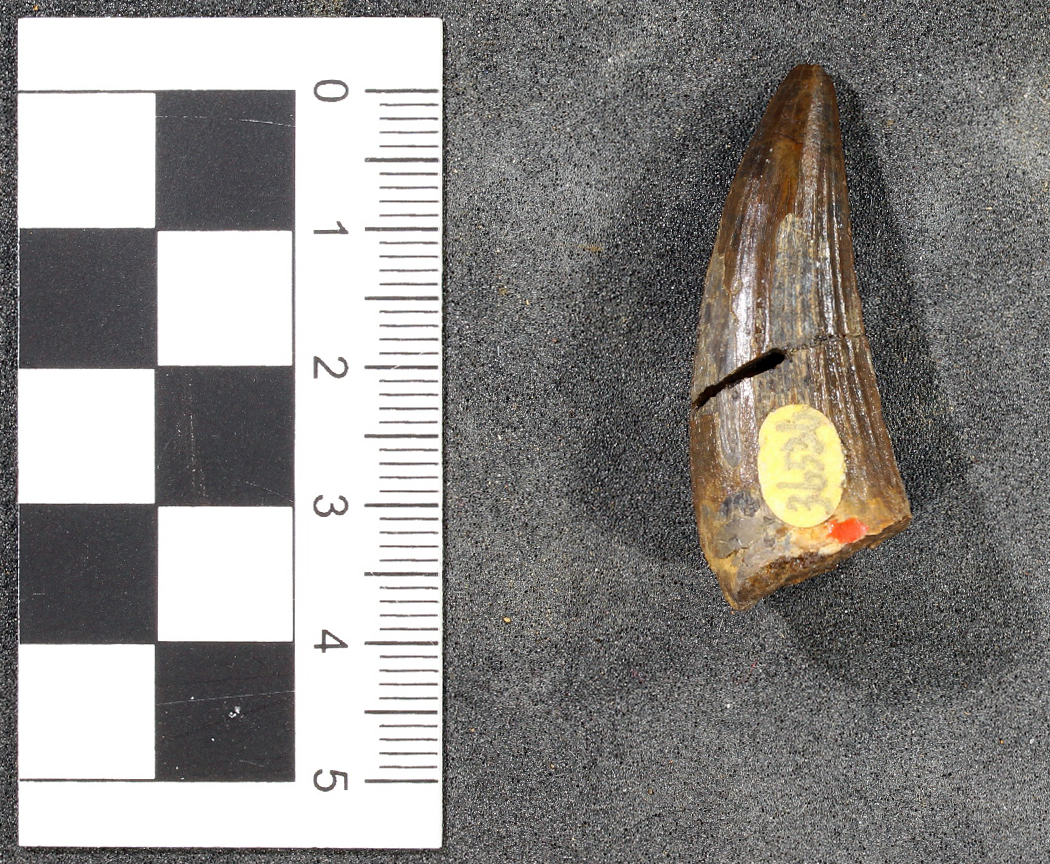
- Holotype tooth of S. cultridens (NHMUK PV R36536)

Scientific classification
- Kingdom: Animalia
- Phylum: Chordata
- Class: Reptilia
- Clade: Dinosauria
- Clade: Saurischia
- Clade: Theropoda
- Family: †Spinosauridae
- Subfamily: †Baryonychinae
- Genus: †Suchosaurus; Owen, 1841

Type species
- †Suchosaurus cultridens Owen, 1841

Other species
- †Suchosaurus girardi Sauvage, 1897

Synonyms
- List of synonyms: Synonyms of genus; Baryonyx? Charig & Milner, 1986 Synonyms of S. cultridens; Crocodilus (Suchosaurus) cultridens Owen, 1841; Suchosaurus laevidens Owen, 1884 (lapsus calami); Baryonyx walkeri? Charig & Milner, 1986

= Suchosaurus =

Suchosaurus Temporal range: Early Cretaceous (Valanginian to Barremian), 135–125 Ma

Extinct genus of dinosaurs

Suchosaurus (meaning "crocodile lizard") is a dubious genus of large theropod dinosaur that lived during the Early Cretaceous in what is now Europe. The type species, S. cultridens, was originally described in 1841 by Richard Owen based on a chimeric assemblage of fossil teeth and vertebrae discovered in the Tilgate Forest, of Sussex, England, in sediments of the Wealden Supergroup. The second species, S. girardi, was established in 1897 by Henri Émile Sauvage from a tooth and fragmentary jaw material recovered from the Papo Seco Formation in Portugal. Initially and generally interpreted as a crocodilian for nearly two centuries (as reflected by its generic name), Suchosaurus was not formally reidentified as a spinosaurid until a 2003 publication by Angela Milner, who also considered it as a possible senior synonym of Baryonyx. This proposal was followed by several authors until 2011, when Octávio Mateus and colleagues regarded the genus as dubious due to the non-diagnostic nature of the assigned fossil material. Named only one year before Owen introduced the term Dinosauria in 1842, Suchosaurus is therefore among the first dinosaurs ever described in the history of paleontology and also represents the very first named spinosaurid, although it was not recognized as such at the time of its original descriptions.

Although known from very limited fossil material, Suchosaurus is estimated to have reached a length of between 8.6–10 metres (28–33 ft), with a minimum body mass of around one tonne. Like other spinosaurids, Suchosaurus was probably a large bipedal carnivore with well-built forelimbs and elongated, crocodile-like skulls. The teeth of Suchosaurus, which constitute the main fossils documenting this taxon, were slightly recurved and displayed a conical to subconical cross-section. The crown also beared numerous longitudinal flutes, and most of the teeth appeared to have fine serrations. Although now considered as a dubious spinosaurid, Suchosaurus is generally assigned to the subfamily Baryonychinae due to its dental characteristics, which it shares with other genera such as Baryonyx and Suchomimus. Like other members of this group, its teeth were most likely adapted for a piscivorous diet. Based on the fossil record associated with the taxon, the animal lived and hunted in fluvial environments alongside numerous other dinosaurs, as well as pterosaurs, crocodylomorphs, turtles, plesiosaurs, fishes, various invertebrates, and even early mammals.

== Research history ==
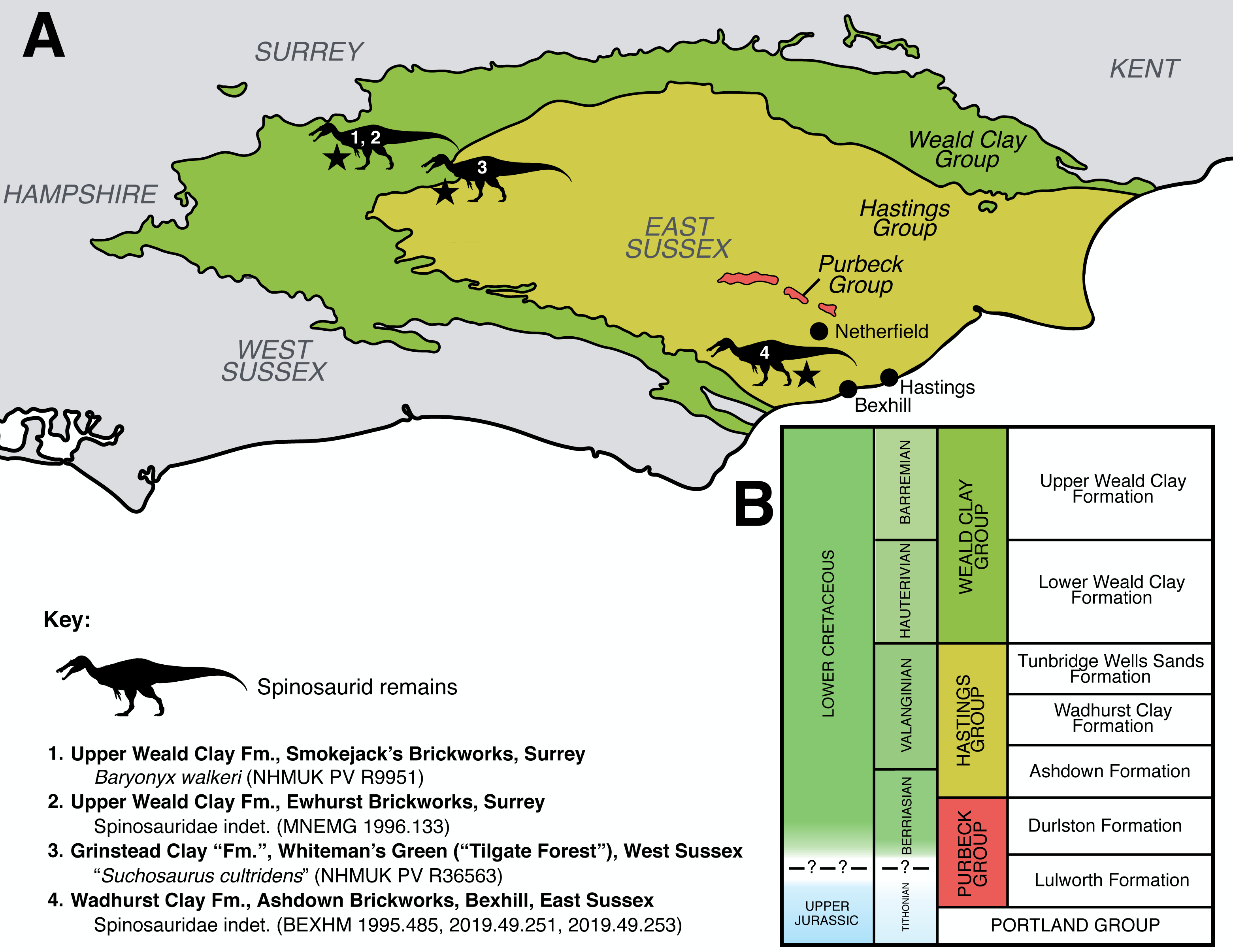
Map showing spinosaurid localities of southeast England; 3 is the Tilgate Forest quarry where Suchosaurus was found

The taxonomic history of Suchosaurus begins in 1822, when British palaeontologist Gideon Mantell and his partner Mary Ann mentioned, in their book The Fossils of the South Downs, teeth that had been discovered by Mantell in a quarry in Tilgate Forest, near Cuckfield in West Sussex, England. Based on their morphology, characterized by well-defined lateral ridges, Mantell's mentor William Clift, then curator of the Hunterian Museum, London, suggested that these fossils might belong either to a crocodile or to a monitor lizard, the couple favoring the former interpretation. In June 1823, Scottish geologist Charles Lyell brought the fossils described by the Mantell couple to Paris, France, so that they could be examined by French naturalist Georges Cuvier. In his work published the following year, Cuvier endorsed the initial 1822 interpretation, although he described most of the teeth only very briefly. Nevertheless, he illustrated four of the Tilgate fossil teeth discovered by Mantell. In 1827, Mantell redescribed these fossils in greater detail, distinguishing them as belonging to two types of crocodilians, separating the blunt-crowned teeth from the more slender and recurved ones, which he considered comparable to those of gharials. Although he did not erect any scientific name to formalize this observation, he attributed the teeth of the second category to a crocodilian that he referred to by the common name "gavial of Tilgate Forest".

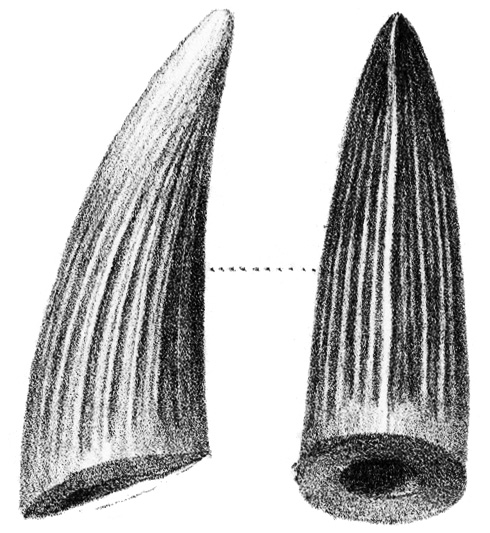
1878 lithograph of the holotype tooth of S. cultridens

In 1841, British palaeontologist Richard Owen established, within the genus Crocodilus, a subgenus and species he named Crocodilus (Suchosaurus) cultridens, based on the fossils discovered by Mantell. The name Suchosaurus comes from the Ancient Greek σοῦχος (souchos, "crocodile"), and σαῦρος (saûros, "lizard"), reflecting its then-accepted affinities with crocodilians. The specific name comes from the Latin culter, "little knife", and dens, "tooth", in reference to the taxon's dental morphology. In his work published the following year (the same work in which he first coined the term Dinosauria), Owen retained Suchosaurus at the rank of subgenus and also referred to it two fossil vertebrae collected by Mantell, without, however, providing any justification for this association. He further considered the expression "gavial of Tilgate Forest" to be the vernacular name of this taxon. The holotype, cited in the scientific literature since the Cuvier's work, consists of a single 3 centimetres (1.2 inches) tooth broken at the upper third of the crown. Like many fossils discovered at Tilgate, this tooth is now housed in the palaeontological collections of the Natural History Museum, London. The original specimen number was BMNH R36536, but it was later re-catalogued as NHMUK PV R36536.

In the years following the publication of Owen's two works, Suchosaurus was elevated to the rank of a distinct genus by Owen himself as well as by other authors. In a work published posthumously in 1867, the French naturalist Charles Léopold Laurillard nevertheless made a taxonomic error regarding this animal: although he acknowledged that Suchosaurus had been named by Owen, he nonetheless attributed the origin of the species name cultridens to Mantell. In an 1878 article, Owen illustrated for the first time the previously mentioned vertebrae, noting that they were not found in direct association with Mantell's teeth, including the holotype. In the second volume of his 1884 work, when he figured again this latter, Owen named it as S. laevidens. This designation was probably a lapsus calami, as he did not use this specific epithet elsewhere in the same publication. In 1888, British naturalist Richard Lydekker determined that the two vertebrae previously attributed to the genus actually belonged to ornithischian dinosaurs. He assigned the first to the family Iguanodontidae and suggested that the second might be referred to the ankylosaur Hylaeosaurus. Lydekker also regarded S. laevidens as a junior synonym of S. cultridens, a position likewise adopted in 1890 by British palaeontologists Arthur Smith Woodward and Charles Davies Sherborn.

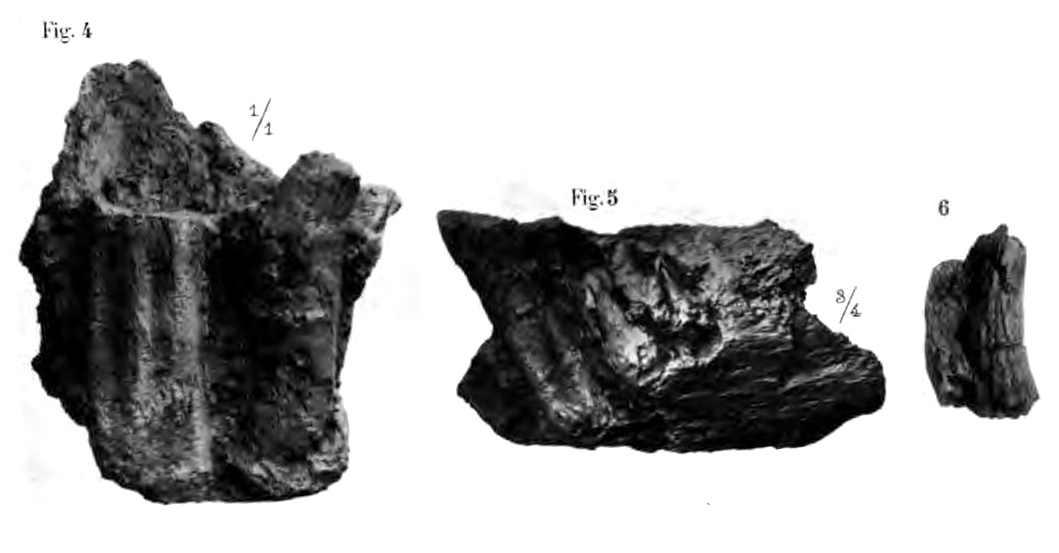
Original fossil elements of the holotype specimen of S. girardi (MG 324 × MNHN/UL.I.F2.176)

In 1896, the French palaeontologist Henri-Émile Sauvage reported the presence of Suchosaurus in Portugal based on fossils discovered by the Swiss geologist Paul Choffat in the locality of Boca do Chapim. Consisting of two jaw fragments and an isolated tooth, this material enabled Sauvage to erect the second species Suchosaurus girardi, the specific name honouring the Portuguese naturalist Albert Girard. The two jaw fragments are currently numbered as MG 324 at the Museu Geológico in Lisbon. In 2007, French palaeontologist Éric Buffetaut noted that the associated single tooth had not been relocated in the institution and therefore regarded it as lost. However, he identified a third mandibular fragment, probably complementary to one of the first two and previously undescribed. In a conference abstract published in 2013, Portuguese palaeontologist Elisabete Malafaia and her colleagues reported the rediscovery of the isolated tooth in the palaeontological collections of the National Museum of Natural History and Science, Lisbon. Now catalogued as MNHN/UL.I.F2.176, the tooth is among the fossils that were saved from a fire that destroyed a significant part of the museum in 1978.

After some fossil teeth collected in Sussex and on the Isle of Wight were routinely labelled to the genus, Suchosaurus was only rarely mentioned in the scientific literature after the late 19th century, probably due to the very limited nature of the fossil material. One of the few notable mentions during the following century comes from Spain, where the palaeontologist José Royo y Gómez in 1927 attributed to this genus fossils discovered in the deposits of Morella, in Castellón. However, these specimens were never described in detail afterwards and appear to have been lost during the Spanish Civil War. They were nevertheless briefly mentioned in 1960 by the Spanish palaeontologist Josep Ramon Bataller.

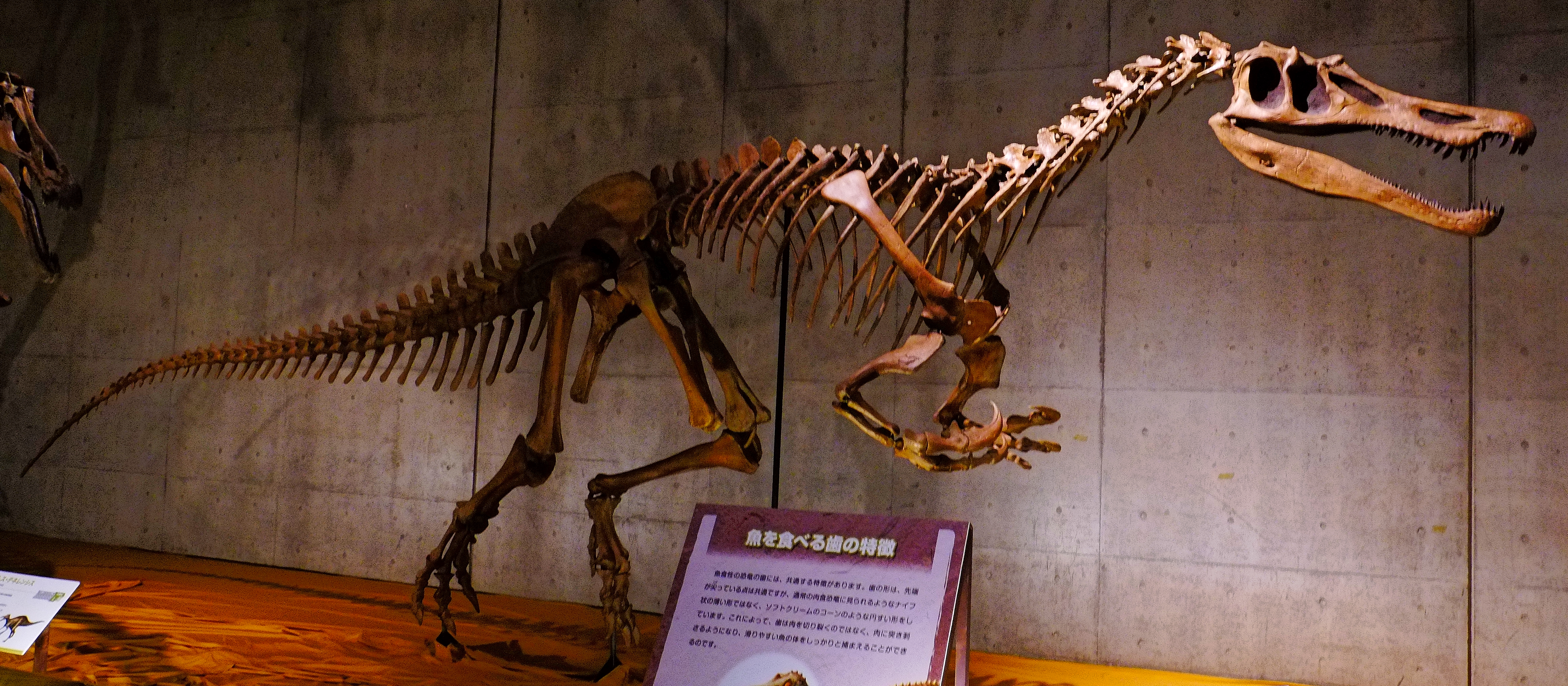
Reconstructed skeletal mount of Baryonyx at the National Museum of Nature and Science, Tokyo. Based on its dental characteristics, Suchosaurus has been reinterpreted as a spinosaurid, and a possible synonymy with the latter has even been suggested

In 1986, British palaeontologists Alan Charig and Angela Milner described the theropod dinosaur Baryonyx walkeri on the basis of a relatively well-preserved partial skeleton discovered near the Ockley, in Surrey. Its initial descriptions highlighted distinctive dental characters, which led some authors to assign several isolated teeth uncovered in the Wealden Supergroup of England to this genus. On the basis of these same morphological criteria, Milner suggested in 2003 that some teeth previously referred to Megalosaurus and Suchosaurus might instead belong to Baryonyx. In his 2007 study, Buffetaut considered the teeth of S. girardi very similar to those of Baryonyx (and S. cultridens) except for the stronger development of the tooth crown flutes (or "ribs"; lengthwise ridges), suggesting that the remains belonged to the same genus. Buffetaut agreed with Milner that the teeth of S. cultridens were almost identical to those of B. walkeri, but with a ribbier surface. The former taxon might be a senior synonym of the latter (since it was published first), depending on whether the differences were within a taxon or between different ones. According to Buffetaut, since the holotype specimen of S. cultridens is a single tooth and that of B. walkeri is a skeleton, it would be more practical to retain the newer name.

In a 2010 review of the taxonomic history of spinosaurids before the original description of the type genus Spinosaurus in 1915, Buffetaut recognized Cuvier's 1824 illustration of the holotype tooth of S. cultridens as the earliest known published depiction of a spinosaurid fossil and one of the oldest published figures of a dinosaur fossil, although neither of these groups had been defined or named when it appeared in print. Buffetaut also stated that it is very likely that the fossils attributed to Suchosaurus by Royo y Gómez in 1927 belonged to the baryonychines, in light of the discovery of fossil teeth from this subgroup at Morella. The discovery of these same teeth was first reported in a conference abstract by the Spanish paleontologist José Ignacio Canudo and his colleagues in 2004. In 2011, Portuguese paleontologist Octávio Mateus and colleagues agreed that Suchosaurus was closely related to Baryonyx, but considered both species in the former genus nomina dubia (dubious names) since their holotype specimens were not considered diagnostic (lacking distinguishing features) and could not be definitely equated with other taxa. However, following its formal reidentification in the early 21st century, Suchosaurus is recognized as the first spinosaurid to have been named, as well as one of the first dinosaurs described in the history of paleontology, although it was not initially identified as such.

== Description ==
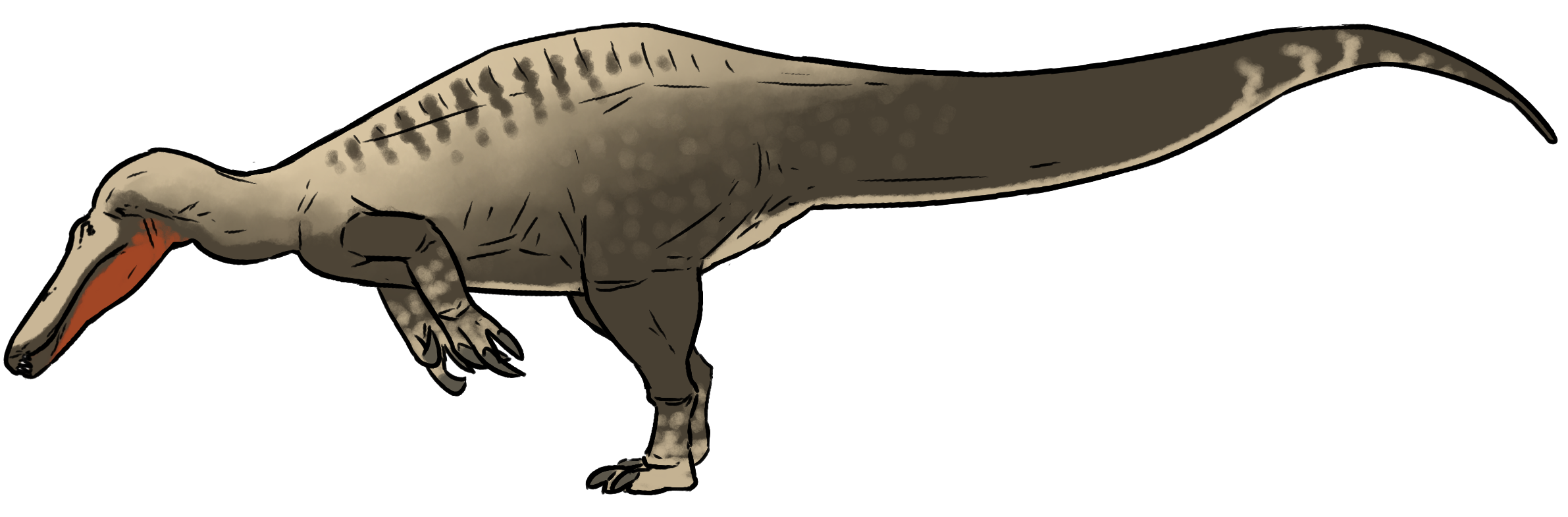
Hypothetical life restoration of S. cultridens

Although known only from very fragmentary fossil remains, Suchosaurus would likely have had an overall morphology broadly similar to that of many other spinosaurids, i. e. large bipedal carnivore with robust forelimbs and an elongated skull resembling that of crocodiles. In 2012, American vertebrate palaeontologist Thomas R. Holtz Jr. tentatively estimated Suchosaurus at around 10 metres (33 ft) in length and weighing between 1 and 4 tonnes (1.1 and 4.4 short tons). In 2016, Spanish palaeontologists Rubén Molina-Pérez and Asier Larramendi estimated S. cultridens at approximately 8.6 m (28 ft) long, 2.15 m (7.1 ft) tall at the hips and weighing 1.4 t (1.5 short tons). When Mantell described in 1827 the assemblage of teeth of the "gavial of Tilgate Forest", he stated that the largest of these teeth would have belonged to an animal of comparable length, estimated between 6–9 metres (20–30 ft) in length.

The dentition of Suchosaurus exhibited several notable differences between the two species. However, the teeth displayed only the basic characteristics of baryonychines and lacked any diagnostic features allowing distinction at the generic level, thus explaining the taxon's status as a nomen dubium. Like Baryonyx, the holotype tooth of S. cultridens possessed a rounded cross-section and was slightly recurvatured, with a crown ornamented by numerous flutes, although these were more abundant in this taxon. In his 2007 study, Buffetaut noted that the species also appeared to differ by the apparent absence of serrations on the carinae (the anterior and posterior cutting edges of a tooth), although this condition may have resulted from a tooth wear. Nevertheless, in 2024, the American palaeontologist Chris T. Barker and colleagues suggested that the absence of serrations probably resulted from taphonomic processes related to the preservation, an interpretation previously supported in 2015 by the Belgian palaeontologist Christophe Hendrickx, who observed fine serrations on the lower posterior portion of the holotype tooth. The teeth of S. girardi were ziphodont, being subcircular in cross-section and bearing seven denticles per millimetre, a count comparable to that observed in Baryonyx. Their roots were very long and slender, exceeding half the length of the crown. The teeth of S. girardi were also as strongly fluted as the holotype of S. cultridens, bearing eight longitudinal ridges on their inner surface and enamel with a microscopically wrinkled texture. At least one tooth of S. girardi appeared to possess a serrated anterior carina. Little information has been reported about the rare fossil jaw fragments of the holotype of S. girardi because of their very incomplete preservation, but they are understood to represent the right portion of the dentary (the largest bone of the lower jaw in diapsids).

== Classification ==
=== Early classifications ===
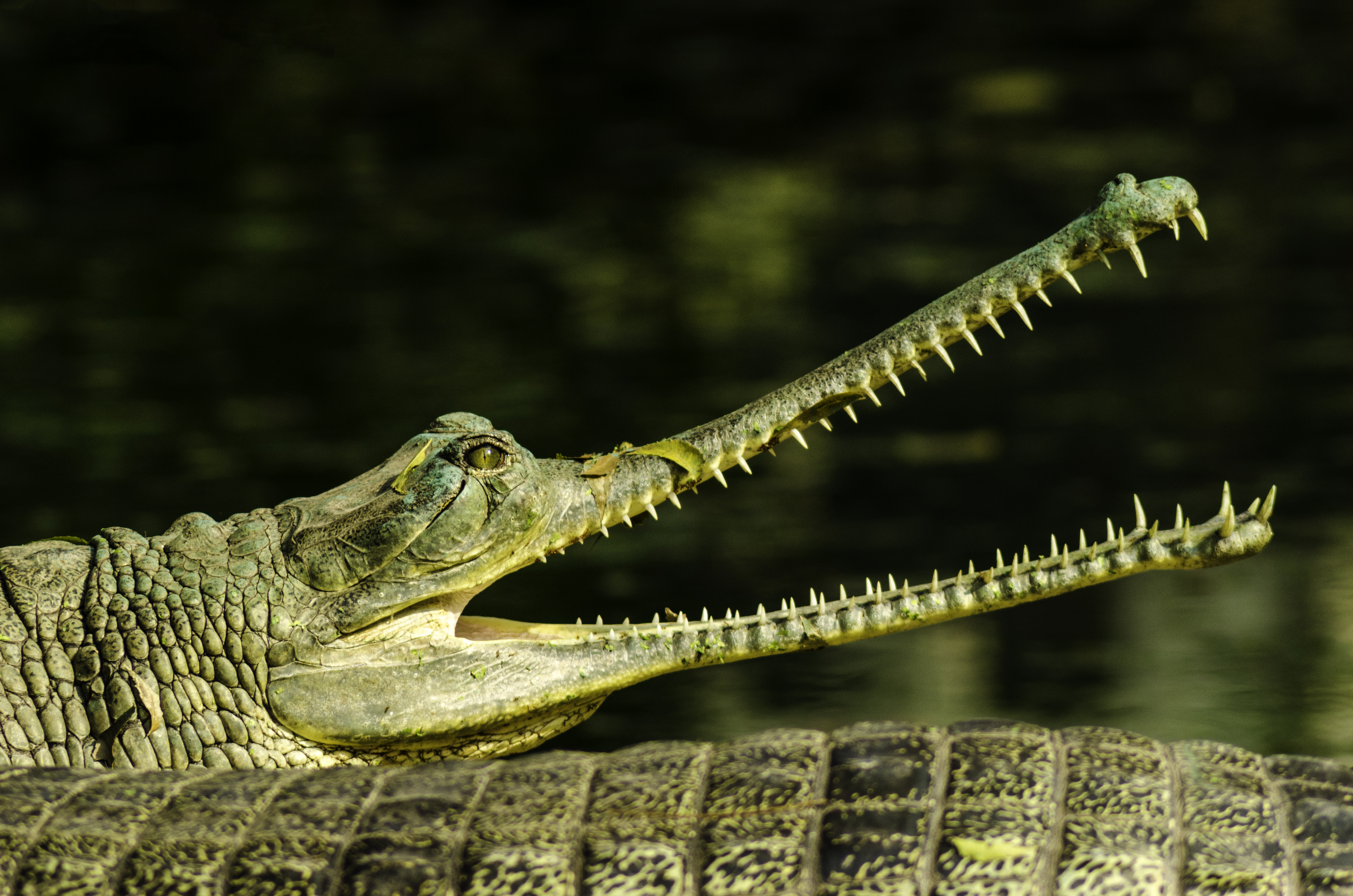
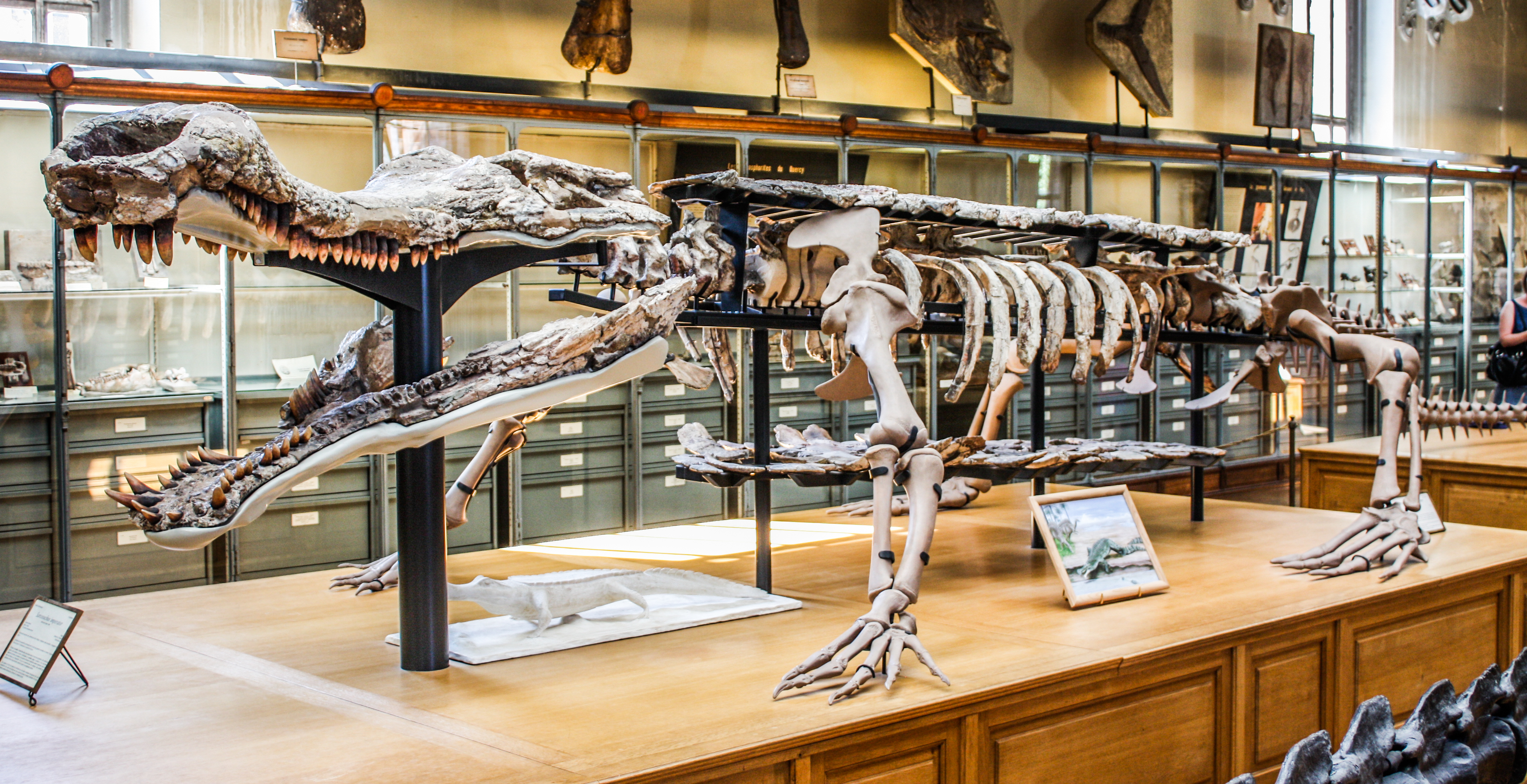
During its taxonomic history, Suchosaurus was initially regarded as being related to gharials (top), before being commonly assigned to the Pholidosauridae (bottom; Sarcosuchus) throughout the 20th century.

Suchosaurus is among the fossil animals that have one longest cases of taxonomic misidentification, having been frequently interpreted as a crocodilian for nearly two centuries. This situation is largely explained by the very limited fossil material then known for spinosaurids, as well as by the morphological similarities between their teeth and those of crocodilians. However, the position of this taxon within crocodilians itself varied repeatedly throughout its taxonomic history. Initially, even before Suchosaurus was formally named, Mantell and Cuvier proposed assigning these fossils to crocodilians, without placing them in a specific subgroup. A more precise classification was first suggested in 1827, when Mantell compared the teeth of the taxon to those of gharials, giving rise to the common name "gavial of Tilgate Forest". However, in 1832, the German palaeontologist Hermann von Meyer assigned the teeth previously described by Mantell and Cuvier to the genus Teleosaurus. In 1842, one year after Suchosaurus was formally named, Owen rejected von Meyer's classification, citing the absence of skeletal remains attributable to teleosaurians in the Wealden deposits to support his interpretation. In most of his works describing Suchosaurus, Owen regularly compared its teeth to those of the "Argenton crocodile" previously described by Cuvier, an animal now referred to the genus Pristichampsus, itself considered as dubious since 2013.

During the 19th and 20th centuries, the majority of the scientific community followed Owen's view regarding the crocodilian nature of Suchosaurus. One of the first authors to adopt this view was the Swiss palaeontologist François-Jules Pictet de la Rive in 1853, who classified Suchosaurus (then spelled as Succhosaurus) among the "doubtful crocodilians". In his 1867 work, Laurillard simply regarded the taxon as a crocodilian from the Secondary strata. In 1883, the Belgian palaeontologist Louis Dollo likewise considered Suchosaurus as a crocodilian, distinguishing its dentition from those of Goniopholis and the newly erected Bernissartia, although without specifying its systematic position. Nevertheless, he noted that the morphology of its teeth reminded him of those of the theropod dinosaur Megalosaurus. Two years later, Woodward assigned Suchosaurus to the Goniopholididae while emphasizing the highly fragmentary nature of the known material. However, he reconsidered this interpretation in 1887, arguing that Suchosaurus was too incomplete to be confidently placed within any crocodilian family. Although Lydekker reached the same conclusion the following year, he and his British colleague Henry Alleyne Nicholson nevertheless stated in 1889 that it was "not improbable" that the genus belonged to the Goniopholididae. Around the same time, the German palaeontologist Karl Alfred von Zittel regarded Suchosaurus as an incertae sedis taxon within the Macrorhynchidae. In his 1896 paper, Sauvage likewise considered Suchosaurus to be a crocodilian of uncertain systematic position. However, when he described S. girardi the following year, he once again referred the genus to the Goniopholididae based on the characters highlighted by Woodward in 1885. In 1900, the Belgian palaeontologist Ernest Van den Broeck in turn reassigned the genus to the Macrorhynchidae. Following the subsequent synonymisation of the Macrorhynchidae with the Pholidosauridae, Suchosaurus was most often assigned to the latter family throughout the remainder of the 20th century, probably as a continuation of the classification proposed by von Zittel.

Nevertheless, several authors during the 19th century did not regard Suchosaurus as a crocodilian. In two papers published in 1846, the German paleontologist Theodor Plieninger classified Suchosaurus (also spelled as Succhosaurus) within a group of reptiles that he named "akidodonts", based on its laterally compressed teeth with sharp edges. This now-obsolete group included numerous archosaurs that are today assigned to phytosaurs, rauisuchians, and dinosaurs. Three years later, in 1849, the German paleontologist Heinrich Georg Bronn reassigned Suchosaurus as a saurian of uncertain position, alongside many other taxa previously placed among the akidodonts by Plieninger. However, he later reclassified it among crocodilians, in accordance with the view that had become widely accepted within the scientific community. In 1879, the British geologist John Whitaker Hulke also expressed doubts regarding the crocodilian nature of Suchosaurus. While describing for the first timethe ornithopod Vectisaurus (now regarded as a synonym of Mantellisaurus), he compared its vertebrae with those then attributed to Suchosaurus by Owen, suggesting in a footnote that the latter might possess affinities with dinosaurs. Nevertheless, Hulke did not specify what evidence supported this interpretation, nor whether it was based on the teeth or the vertebrae then referred to the taxon. One year earlier, Owen himself had also suggested dinosaurian affinities for Suchosaurus in his 1878 paper. However, although he largely repeated his description of the taxon in the first volume of his work published in 1884, he omitted any mention of such affinities.

=== Identification as a spinosaurid ===
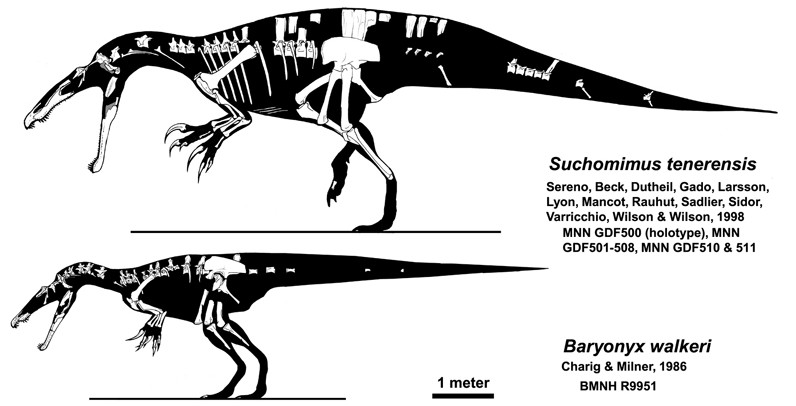
Skeletal diagram combining several specimens of Suchomimus (above) with the holotype of Baryonyx (below), two spinosaurid genus closely related to Suchosaurus

Since its formal reidentification by Milner in 2003, Suchosaurus has been recognized as a theropod dinosaur belonging to the family Spinosauridae and the subfamily Baryonychinae. This lineage was initially erected at the rank of a distinct family, under the name Baryonychidae, when Baryonyx was formally described by Charig and Milner in 1986, the authors then considering this genus sufficiently unique to justify such a classification. It was later reduced to the rank of a subfamily within the Spinosauridae in 1998 by the American palaeontologist Paul Sereno and his colleagues during their formal description of Suchomimus. One of the main characteristics used to distinguish baryonychines from spinosaurines is the frequent presence of fine serrations on their teeth, a feature that remains paradoxically poorly documented in Suchosaurus. In their description of Suchomimus, Sereno and his colleagues also united spinosaurids and their closest relatives within the superfamily Spinosauroidea. In a 2007 conference abstract, the American palaeontologist Denver W. Fowler suggested that since Suchosaurus is the first named genus in its group, the clade names Spinosauroidea, Spinosauridae, and Baryonychinae should be replaced by Suchosauroidea, Suchosauridae, and Suchosaurinae, regardless of whether or not the name Baryonyx is retained. Nevertheless, in 2010, the British palaeontologist Roger Benson regarded Spinosauroidea as a junior synonym of Megalosauroidea, which had been established earlier, although he retained the traditional classification of the Spinosauridae. A 2017 study by the Brazilian palaeontologists Marcos A. F. Sales and Cesar L. Schultz found that the clade Baryonychinae was not well supported, since serrated teeth may be an ancestral trait among spinosaurids. Nevertheless, the validity of this group is still maintained in some subsequent studies.

== Palaeobiology ==
Though few skull material has been discovered for Suchosaurus, it is known that spinosaurid skulls resembled those of crocodiles; they were long, low, narrow and expanded at their front ends into a terminal rosette-like shape, with a robust secondary palate on the roof of the mouth that made them more resistant to stress and bending. In contrast, the primitive and typical condition for theropods was a tall, broader and wedge-like snout with a less developed secondary palate. The skull adaptations of spinosaurids converged with those of crocodilians; early members of the latter group had skulls similar to typical non-avian (or non-bird) theropods, later developing elongated snouts, conical teeth, and secondary palates. These adaptations may have been the result of a dietary change from terrestrial prey to fish. Most theropod dinosaurs have recurved, blade-like teeth with serrated carinae for slicing through flesh, whereas spinosaurid teeth evolved to be straighter, more conical, and have small or nonexistent serrations. Such dentition is seen in living piscivorous predators such as gharials, as it is better suited for piercing and maintaining grip on slippery aquatic prey so it can be swallowed whole, rather than torn apart.

== Palaeoecology ==
=== England ===
The original stratigraphic position of the holotype tooth of S. cultridens does not appear to be unanimously agreed upon among geologists. The specimen comes from the Grinstead Clay, a unit dated to the late Valanginian of the Early Cretaceous, whose status varies according to authors: it is considered either as a distinct geological formation or a member of the Tunbridge Wells Sand Formation. In any case, it originates from the fossil record of the Wealden Supergroup of England, a geological group divided into numerous formations with ages that are both older and younger. During the Early Cretaceous, the Weald area of Surrey, Sussex, and Kent was partly covered by the large, fresh-to-brackish water Wealden Lake. Two large rivers drained the northern area (where London now stands), flowing into the lake through a river delta; the Anglo-Paris Basin was in the south. Its climate was sub-tropical, similar to the present Mediterranean region. Other dinosaurs discovered in the Grinstead Clay include ornithopods such as the iguanodontian Barilium, the possible stegosaur Regnosaurus, and the ankylosaur Hylaeosaurus. Invertebrates are chiefly represented by molluscs, including bivalves and gastropods, as well as arthropods, notably ostracods and insects. The Grinstead Clay has also yielded fossils of horsetails.

=== Portugal ===
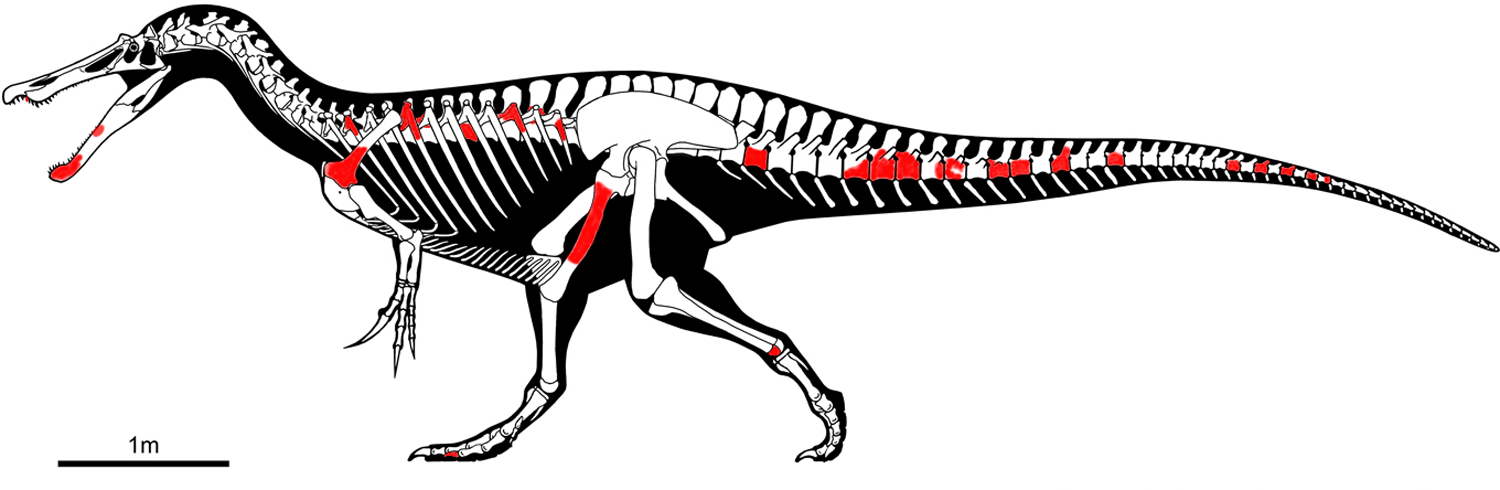
Skeletal reconstruction of Iberospinus, a contemporaneous spinosaurid with S. girardi from the Papo Seco Formation.

S. girardi is known from the Papo Seco Formation, which dates to the early Barremian age of the Early Cretaceous epoch. The formation's depositional environment exhibits a shift from shallow marine to continental, with stratigraphically higher layers representing an estuarine setting. Many other fossil taxa have been found in localities of the Papo Seco Formation. The only formally identified contemporaneous theropod is the spinosaurid Iberospinus (whose holotype had previously been interpreted as belonging to Baryonyx), although fragmentary bones also indicate the presence of representatives of other lineages, including a possible dromaeosaurid and a coelurosaurian. Two theropod footprint types have been found, one that is smaller with narrow digits, belonging to an indeterminate theropod, and another referrable to the ichnogenus Megalosauripus, likely produced by a carnosaurian theropod such as a spinosaurid. The other dinosaurs present in the formation are sauropods and ornithopods. Sauropod material includes the remains of indeterminate sauropods, eusauropods, titanosauriforms, and titanosaurs. The only formally described ornithopod genus is Cariocecus, but other evidence of their presence includes fragmentary remains of unnamed taxa, consisting of isolated teeth and bones (e.g., incomplete vertebrae and limb bones). A probable ornithopod footprint has also been described from the formation. Non-dinosaurian vertebrate fossils from the Papo Seco Formation include teeth referred to ornithocheirid and ctenochasmatoid pterosaurs, cf. Anteophthalmosuchus sp. (a goniopholidid crocodyliform), and cf. Lepidotes sp. (a semionotiform actinopterygian) and carapace fragments and a partial radius of pancheloniids (sea turtles). Invertebrate fossils comprise aquatic bivalves (Eomiodon, Nipponomaia, and ostreidans) and gastropods (Chemnitzia, Natica sp., Turritella).
