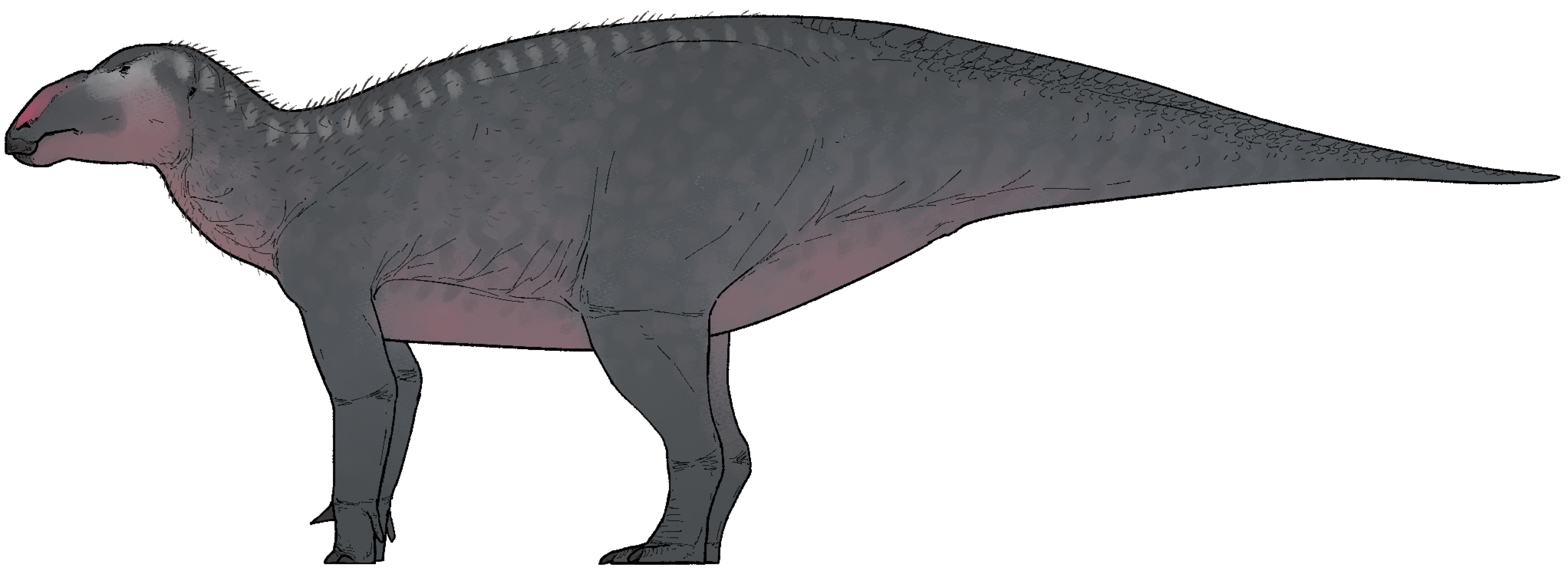
- Speculative life restoration

Scientific classification
- Kingdom: Animalia
- Phylum: Chordata
- Class: Reptilia
- Clade: Dinosauria
- Clade: †Ornithischia
- Clade: †Ornithopoda
- Superfamily: †Hadrosauroidea
- Genus: †Haolong; Huang et al., 2026
- Species: †H. dongi

Binomial name
- †Haolong dongi Huang et al., 2026

= Haolong =

Haolong Temporal range: Early Cretaceous (Barremian), 125.46 Ma

Genus of ornithopod dinosaurs

Haolong (lit. 'spiny dragon') is an extinct genus of hadrosauroid ornithopod dinosaur known from the Early Cretaceous (Barremian age) Yixian Formation of Liaoning, China. The genus contains a single species, Haolong dongi, known from a nearly complete, articulated skeleton with preserved integumentary structures.

== Naming ==
The generic name, Haolong, comes from Mandarin Chinese and translates to "spiny dragon," in reference to its integumentary structures. The specific name, dongi, honors Dong Zhiming, a prominent Chinese paleontologist.

== Description ==
Haolong is known from a single specimen, the holotype AGM 16793, which was recovered from the Yixian Formation. It represents a nearly complete juvenile about 2.45 m (8.0 ft) long. The specimen preserves remains of the integumentary system, which consists of scales interspersed with hollow, keratinous spines preserved down to the nuclear level. These differ from the protofeathers of non-avian theropods and the spines of extant squamates, and have been compared to porcupine quills. They may have served as protection from predators, as thermoregulatory aids, or as tactile structures. Since the specimen is a juvenile, it is unknown if adults also possessed similar structures.

== Classification ==
To determine the relationships and affinities of Haolong, Huang et al. (2026) scored it in an updated version of the phylogenetic matrix of Bertozzo et al. (2025). They recovered Haolong as an early-diverging member of the Hadrosauroidea, branching after a European clade comprising Brighstoneus, Cariocecus, and Comptonatus, but before the other known Yixian Formation taxa (Bolong and Jinzhousaurus). These results are displayed in the cladogram below:

- Hadrosauriformes
  - Iguanodontidae
  - Hadrosauroidea
    - - Ouranosaurus nigeriensis
      - Morelladon beltrani
    - - Bayannurosaurus perfectus
      - - - Cariocecus bocagei
          - Brighstoneus simmondsi
          - Comptonatus chasei
        - - Haolong dongi
          - - Altirhinus kurzanovi
            - - Jinzhousaurus yangi
              - - Bolong yixianensis
                - - Xuwulong yueluni
                  - - Equijubus normani
                    - - Batyrosaurus rozhdestvenskyi
                      - - Probactrosaurus gobiensis
                        - Hadrosauromorpha
                          ⊞ ⇒
                          - Eolambia caroljonesa
                          - - - Jeyawati rugoculus
                              - Protohadros byrdi
                            - - Plesiohadros djadokhtaensis
                              - - - Gilmoreosaurus mongoliensis
                                  - Bactrosaurus johnsoni
                                - - Levnesovia transoxiana
                                  - - Tethyshadros insularis
                                    - - Telmatosaurus transsylvanicus
                                      - - Eotrachodon orientalis
                                        - Tanius sinensis
                                        - - - Claosaurus agilis
                                            - Huehuecanauhtlus tiquichensis
                                          - - Lophorhothon atopus
                                            - Hadrosauridae
                          ⊟

== See also ==
- Paleobiota of the Yixian Formation
