= Cariocecus bocagei =

Cariocecus bocagei Temporal range: Early Cretaceous, early Barremian
- 3D model of the fused holotype maxilla + jugal

Scientific classification
- Kingdom: Animalia
- Phylum: Chordata
- Class: Reptilia
- Clade: Dinosauria
- Clade: †Ornithischia
- Clade: †Ornithopoda
- Clade: †Hadrosauriformes
- Superfamily: †Hadrosauroidea
- Genus: †Cariocecus; Bertozzo et al., 2025
- Species: †C. bocagei

Binomial name
- †Cariocecus bocagei Bertozzo et al., 2025

Genus of ornithopod dinosaurs

Cariocecus bocagei is an extinct species of hadrosauroid ornithopod dinosaurs known from the Early Cretaceous of what is now Portugal. C. bocagei is the only species in the genus Cariocecus. It is known from a partial skull that was discovered in 2016 and subsequently given a scientific name and description in 2025. This specimen represents the first iguanodontian skull to be found in the country.

The skull of Cariocecus has some unusual features. A large bony brow over the eye may have protected the eye from damage and sun glare. This bone was situated very low on the eye socket, giving the animal an 'eagle-eyed' appearance. The maxilla and jugal, two bones of the upper jaw, were strongly fused, unlike all other ornithopods. This might have allowed the animal to chew tougher materials compared to its relatives. Cariocecus was likely a close relative of two hadrosauroids from England, Brighstoneus and Comptonatus.

Cariocecus is known from the Papo Seco Formation, which dates to the Barremian age of the Cretaceous period. This formation has also yielded the remains of other dinosaurs, including the spinosaurid Iberospinus and fragmentary coelurosaurian theropods and titanosauriform sauropods, in addition to pterosaurs, turtles, crocodyliforms, fish, and aquatic shelled invertebrates. These fossils were deposited in a shallow marine to continental environment.

== Discovery and naming ==
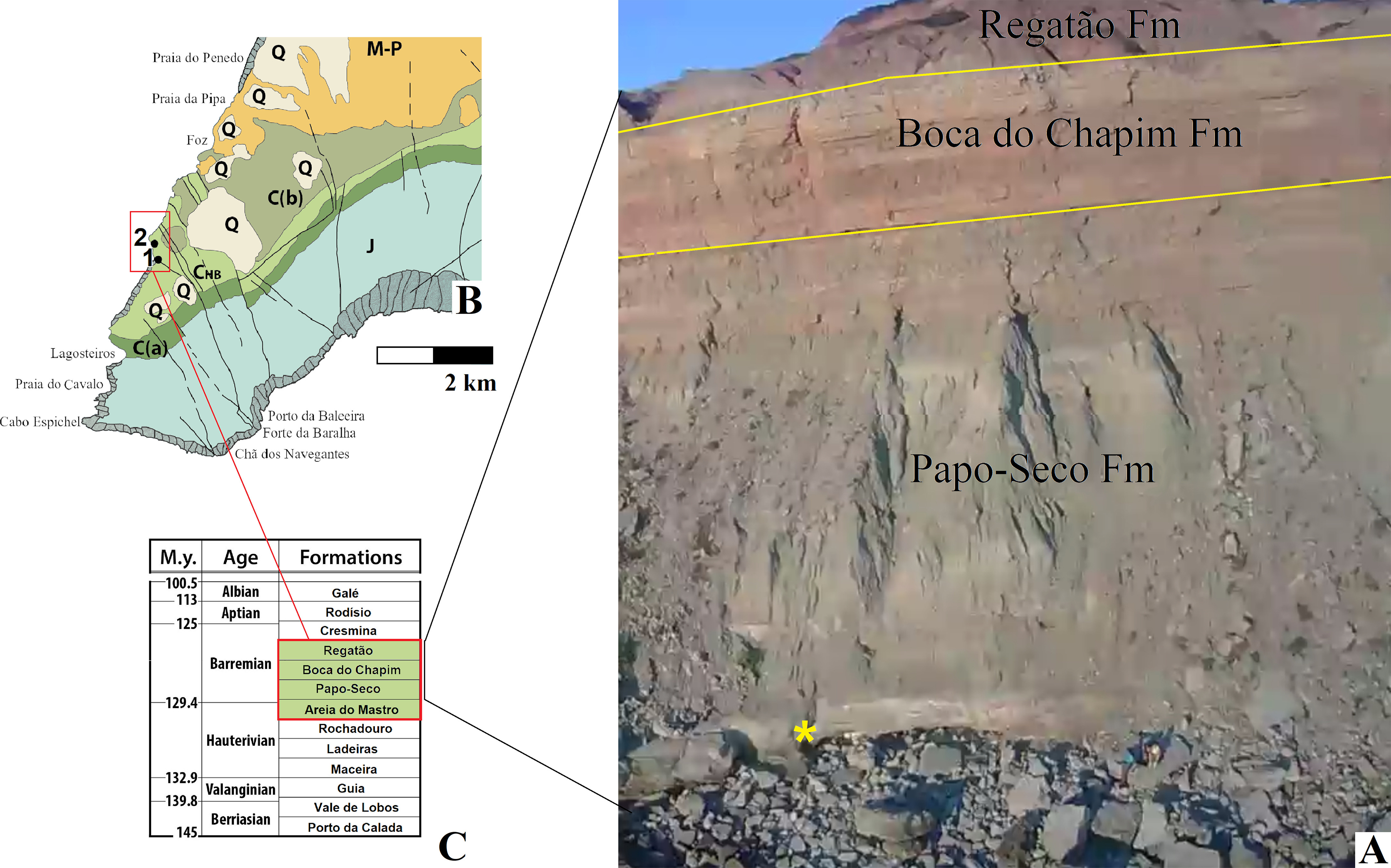
Rock outcrops at the 'Praia do Areia do Mastro' site

In 2016, a partial articulated ornithopod skull was discovered by Pedro Marrecas in a limestone outcrop of the Papo Seco Formation. The site was 200 metres (660 ft) away from the 'Praia do Areia do Mastro' locality on the shore of the Setúbal Peninsula in Sesimbra Municipality, Portugal. The specimen was then taken to the Royal Belgian Institute of Natural Sciences, where it was prepared by Stéphane Berton in 2024 and μCT-scanned to better study the internal and obscured anatomy. It was then transferred to the Sociedade de Historia Natural in Torres Vedras, Portugal, where it is now permanently accessioned as specimen SHN.832. Much of the skull is preserved, including part of both premaxillae, the nasals, the frontals, and almost all of the basicranium, and many of the bones from the right half of the skull (maxilla, jugal, ectopterygoid, lacrimal, prefrontal, supraorbital, postorbital).

In 2025, Filippo Bertozzo and colleagues described Cariocecus bocagei as a new genus and species of hadrosauroid dinosaurs, establishing SHN.832 as the holotype specimen. The generic name, Cariocecus, references the Iberian and Lusitanian war deity of the same name (syncretised with Mars and Ares after the region was conquered by the Roman Empire). The name of the dinosaur also alludes to the holotype skull's superficial resemblance to those of goats and horses, which were ritually sacrificed to Cariocecus. The specific name, bocagei, honors Portuguese naturalist José Vicente Barbosa du Bocage and his academic work and impact.

Cariocecus is the fourth definitive iguanodontian named from Portugal, following Draconyx in 2001, Eousdryosaurus in 2014, and Hesperonyx in 2024 (all of which are known from the Jurassic Lourinhã Formation). Importantly, it is the first Portuguese iguanodontian found that preserves a skull, as the other three are known only from postcranial remains. Various fragmentary iguanodontian specimens have been found in the Papo Seco Formation from which Cariocecus is known, but have not been classified beyond Iguanodontia or Styracosterna indet. (indeterminate). These remains include isolated teeth, a maxilla fragment with teeth distinct from Cariocecus, four caudal (tail) vertebrae, and the distal (bottom) end of a femur.

== Description ==
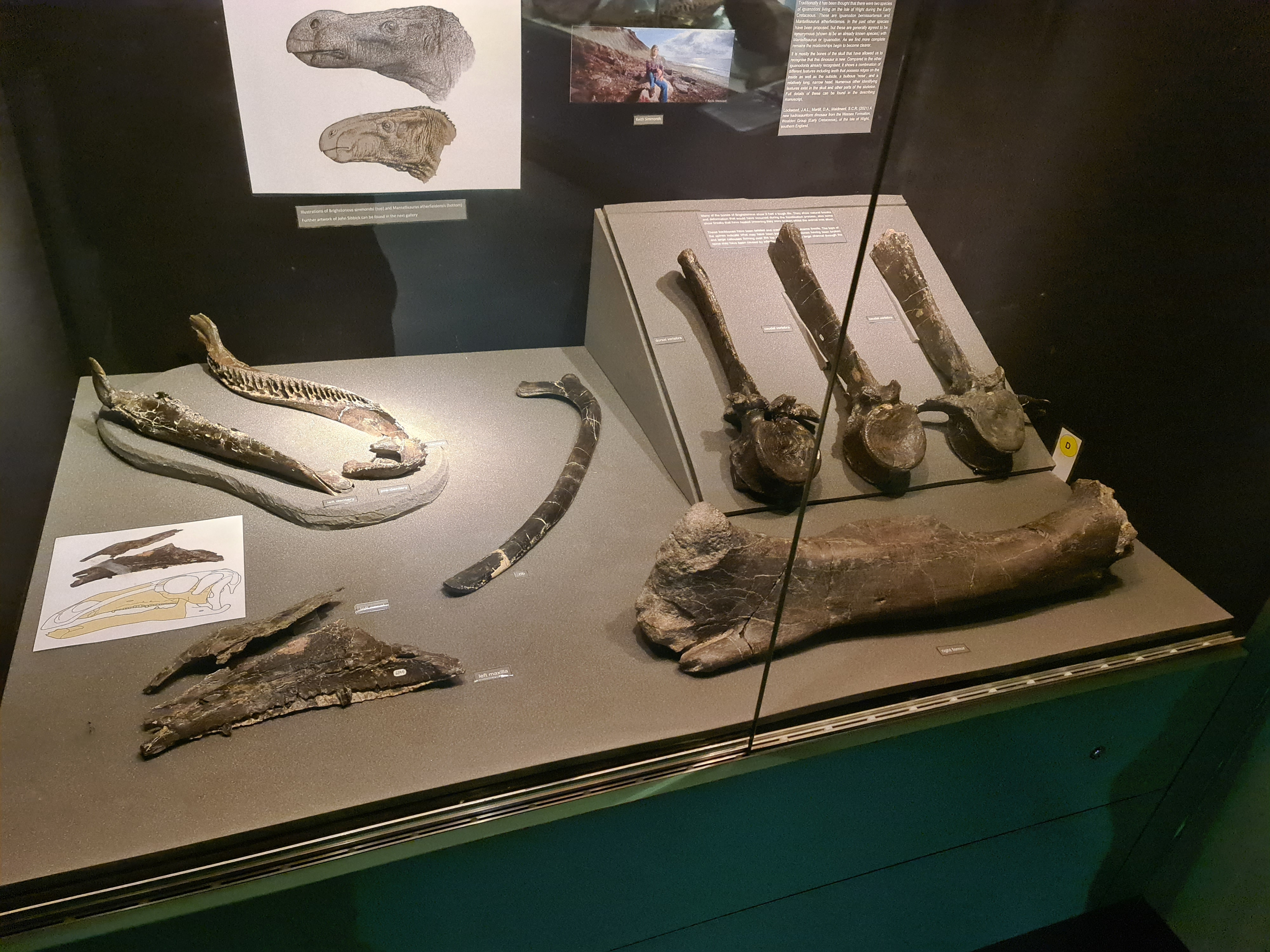
Holotype specimen of the related Brighstoneus which, unlike Cariocecus, bore a nasal crest

The general profile of the skull is low, and the cranial vault (part of the skull that holds the brain) is flattened. Unlike some ornithopods such as Muttaburrasaurus, Altirhinus, and the closely related Brighstoneus, Cariocecus did not have a nasal crest on the snout region. The orbit has a sub-circular shape. There are seventeen tooth positions preserved in the maxilla, though only twelve teeth are erupted and the anteriormost (toward the front) region is not preserved. Replacement teeth were observed using the μCT data, with one replacement tooth per alveolus (socket). The ascending process of the maxilla is taller than wide, and its shape is similar to later-diverging members of the Hadrosauridae like Amurosaurus and Hypacrosaurus.

Cariocecus can be distinguished from all other ornithopods based on three autapomorphies (unique characters). First, the rostral ramus of the jugal (part projecting toward the front of the snout) is completely fused to the maxilla (upper tooth-bearing bone), making the two bones a single unit with no distinguishable separation point between them. Second, the supraorbital ('palpebral') only articulates with the lacrimal, whereas it also contacts the prefrontal in other ornithopods. This bone projected over the eye, likely giving the animal's face an 'eagle-eyed' appearance. Third, when seen from the back, the top margin of the supraoccipital has three knobs.

=== Size and ontogenetic stage ===
Based on the holotype, Bertozzo and colleagues described Cariocecus as a "medium-sized" member of the Iguanodontia. Given the incomplete nature of the specimen, a model of the full skull was made, aided by the presumed close relatives Brighstoneus and Comptonatus to fill in missing data. Based on this reconstruction, the length of the base of the skull was estimated at 42.3 centimetres (16.7 in). Since the sutures between almost all of the individual skull bones had not yet fully co-ossified (fused together), this individual likely had not reached skeletal maturity at the time of its death, meaning it had not yet reached its adult body size. Notably, the orbit ('eye socket') of tetrapods is generally larger in less mature animals, decreasing in size (in relation to the rest of the skull) as it develops. Using a linear regression based on a dataset comparing orbit to skull sizes in 18 ornithopod species, the researchers determined that, despite the immaturity of the holotype individual, it had already reached the expected adult orbit size.

=== Palaeobiology ===
The prominent and ventrally-placed supraorbital of Cariocecus may have protected the eye from both physical damage and glare from the sun. As such, it can reasonably be inferred that it foraged during the day, with the supraorbital and associated tissues acting as a shade over the eye, allowing it to stay visually alert for predators more effectively. The fused maxilla+jugal complex is an unusual trait, and it may have been an adaptation to allow Cariocecus to chew or process harder materials.

== Classification ==
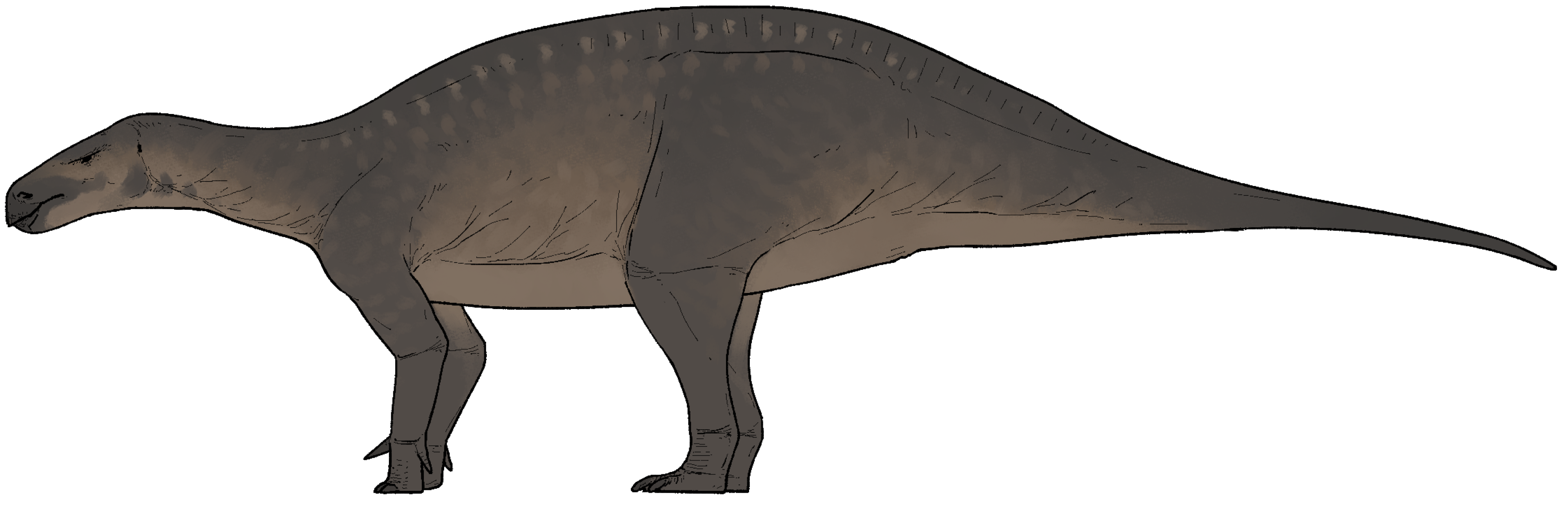
Speculative life restoration of Cariocecus

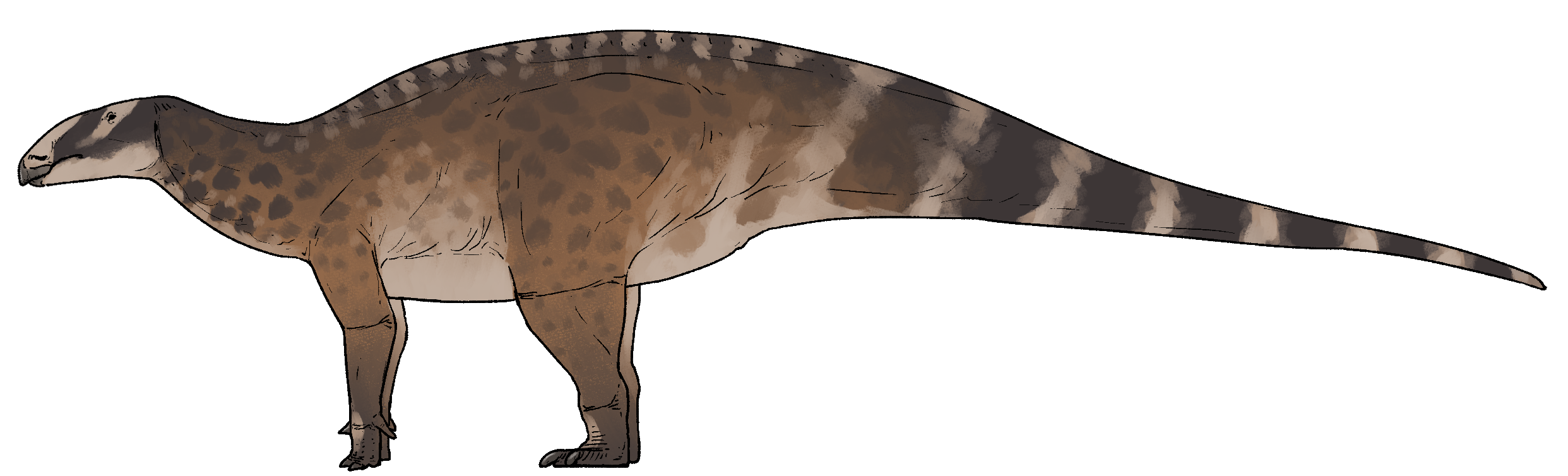
Life restoration of the related Comptonatus

To determine the relationships and affinities of Cariocecus, Bertozzo and colleagues scored it in a phylogenetic dataset based on a combination of several previously published matrices. In their analyses, Cariocecus was consistently recovered as the sister taxon to a clade formed by Brighstoneus and Comptonatus—two genera from the Wessex Formation of England—near the base of Hadrosauroidea. Previous analyses including the English taxa failed to find such a close relationship between them; Brighstoneus was first recognized as the sister taxon to the Nigerian Ouranosaurus outside of both Hadrosauroidea and the more inclusive Hadrosauriformes, and later recovered as the earliest-diverging hadrosauroid, while Comptonatus has been recognized as a member of the Iguanodontidae, closely allied with Mantellisaurus, another English taxon. The results of the analyses (implied weighting, K = 15) of Bertozzo et al. (2025) are displayed in the cladogram below:

- Hadrosauriformes
  - Iguanodontidae
    - Iguanodon bernissartensis
    - Mantellisaurus atherfieldensis
  - Hadrosauroidea
    - - Ouranosaurus nigeriensis
      - Morelladon beltrani
    - - - Cariocecus bocagei
        - - Brighstoneus simmondsi
          - Comptonatus chasei
      - - Bolong yixianensis
        - - Altirhinus kurzanovi
          - - Jinzhousaurus yangi
            - - Equijubus normani
              - - - Xuwulong yueluni
                  - Jintasaurus meniscus
                - - Batyrosaurus rozhdestvenskyi
                  - - Probactrosaurus gobiensis
                    - Hadrosauromorpha
                      ⊞ ⇒
                      - Gongpoquansaurus mazongshanensis
                      - - Eolambia caroljonesa
                        - - - Protohadros byrdi
                            - Jeyawati rugoculus
                          - - Plesiohadros djadokhtaensis
                            - - - Gilmoreosaurus mongoliensis
                                - Bactrosaurus johnsoni
                              - - Levnesovia transoxiana
                                - - Eotrachodon orientalis
                                  - Telmatosaurus transsylvanicus
                                  - Tanius sinensis
                                  - Tethyshadros insularis
                                  - - - Claosaurus agilis
                                      - Huehuecanauhtlus tiquichensis
                                    - - Lophorhothon atopus
                                      - Hadrosauridae
                      ⊟

In their 2026 description of the Chinese hadrosauroid Haolong, Huang and colleagues used an updated version of this phylogenetic matrix and recovered a similar clade comprising Cariocecus, Brightstoneus, and Comptonatus.

== Palaeoecology ==
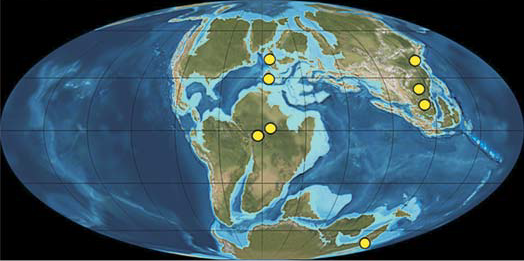
Palaeogeographic map of Earth during the Barremian−Aptian ages

Cariocecus is known from the Papo Seco Formation, which dates to the early Barremian age of the mid-Early Cretaceous epoch. The formation's depositional environment exhibits a shift from shallow marine to continental, with stratigraphically higher layers representing an estuarine setting.

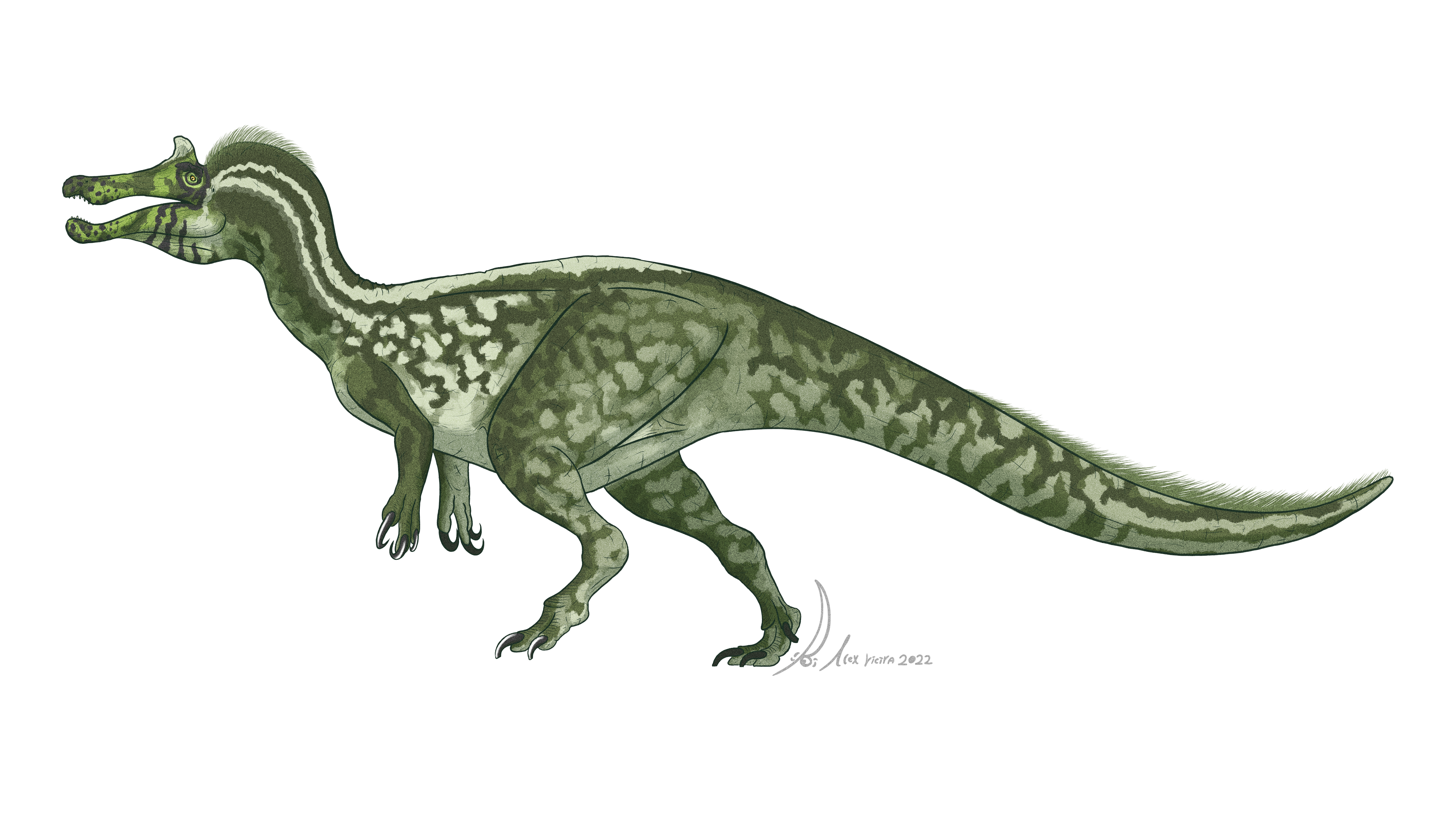
Speculative life restoration of the coeval Iberospinus

Many other fossil taxa have been found in localities of the Papo Seco Formation. Other evidence of ornithopods includes fragmentary remains of unnamed taxa comprising isolated teeth and isolated bones (e.g., incomplete vertebrae and limb bones). A probable ornithopod footprint has also been described from the formation. The only other named dinosaur regarded as a valid taxon from the formation is the spinosaurid theropod Iberospinus. Two theropod footprint types have been found, one that is smaller with narrow digits, belonging to an indeterminate theropod, and another referrable to the ichnogenus Megalosauripus, likely produced by a carnosaurian theropod such as a spinosaurid. Fragmentary forelimb bones indicate the presence of smaller theropods, assigned to cf. Coelurosauria indet. and cf. Dromaeosauridae indet. Sauropod material includes the remains of indeterminate sauropods, eusauropods, titanosauriforms, and titanosaurs.

Non-dinosaurian vertebrate fossils from the Papo Seco Formation include teeth referred to ornithocheirid and ctenochasmatoid pterosaurs, cf. Anteophthalmosuchus sp. (a goniopholidid crocodyliform), and cf. Lepidotes sp. (a semionotiform actinopterygian) and carapace fragments and a partial radius of pancheloniids (sea turtles). Invertebrate fossils comprise aquatic bivalves (Eomiodon, Nipponomaia, and ostreidans) and gastropods (Chemnitzia, Natica sp., Turritella).
