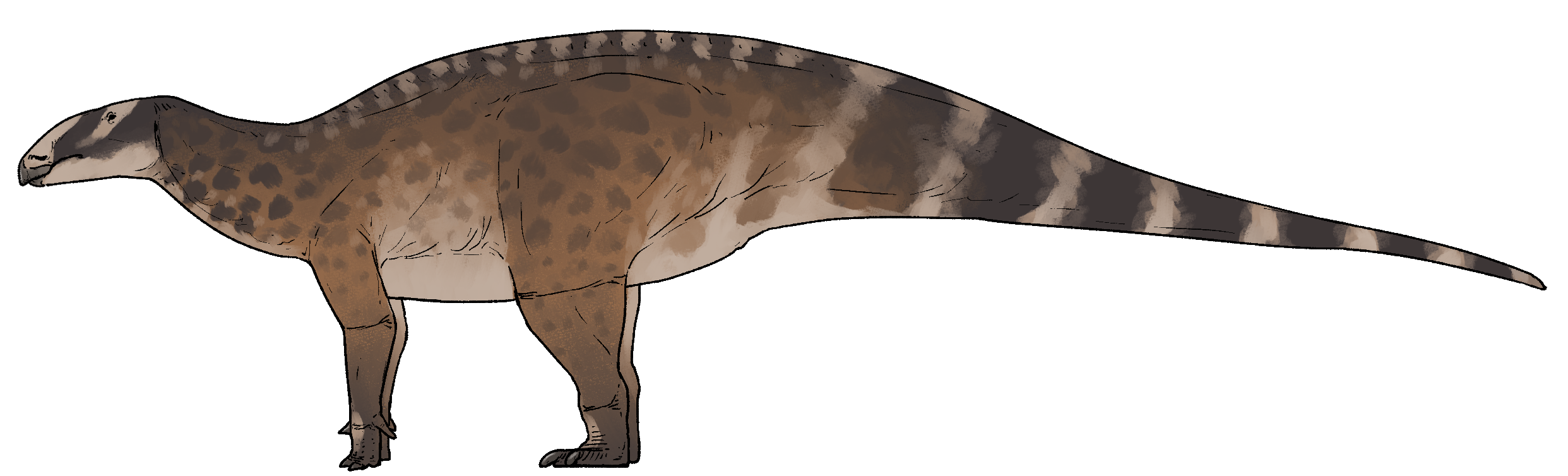
- Speculative life reconstruction

Scientific classification
- Kingdom: Animalia
- Phylum: Chordata
- Class: Reptilia
- Clade: Dinosauria
- Clade: †Ornithischia
- Clade: †Ornithopoda
- Genus: †Comptonatus; Lockwood, Martill & Maidment, 2024
- Species: †C. chasei

Binomial name
- †Comptonatus chasei Lockwood, Martill & Maidment, 2024

= Comptonatus =

Comptonatus Temporal range: Early Cretaceous, Barremian–Aptian

Genus of ornithopod dinosaurs

Comptonatus (meaning "the Compton thunderer") is a genus of ornithopod dinosaur from the early Cretaceous period. Its remains are known from the Wessex Formation in England. The type and only species is C. chasei.

== Discovery and naming ==
The holotype specimen, IWCMS 2014.80, was excavated in September–October 2013, close to where a Valdosaurus specimen was recovered the previous year. It is the most complete ornithopod dinosaur found on the Isle of Wight since Mantellisaurus in 1914.

Comptonatus was described as a new genus and species of iguanodontian dinosaur in 2024. The generic name, Comptonatus, combines the name of the location Compton with the Latin tonatus, meaning "thundered", and has the intended meaning of "the Compton thunderer", in reference to its discovery location and large size. The specific name, chasei, honours the late Nick Chase, who won the Palaeontological Association's Mary Anning Award in 2018 and discovered the specimen.

== Classification ==
Comptonatus was entered into a phylogenetic analysis using the dataset of the description of the contemporary Brighstoneus. It was found to be in a clade with Iguanodon, Barilium, and Mantellisaurus, all from southern England, which has been termed the Iguanodontidae. The cladogram from the analysis is shown below:

- Styracosterna
  - Uteodon
  - - Dakotadon
    - - Hippodraco
      - - Iguanacolossus
        - - Proa
          - - Lanzhousaurus
            - - Hypselospinus
              - - Bayannurosaurus
                - - Ouranosaurus
                  - Hadrosauriformes
                    - Iguanodontidae
                      - Iguanodon
                      - - Barilium
                        - - Comptonatus
                          - Mantellisaurus
                    - Hadrosauroidea
                      - Brighstoneus
                      - - - Bolong
                          - Jinzhousaurus
                        - - Altirhinus
                          - - Equijubus
                            - - Batyrosaurus
                              - Penelopognathus
                            - - Sirindhorna
                              - Hadrosauromorpha

Using a novel phylogenetic matrix for their description of the Portuguese hadrosauroid Cariocecus bocagei, Bertozzo et al. (2025) recovered this taxon as the sister taxon to a clade formed by Comptonatus and Brighstoneus. These taxa were placed within the Hadrosauroidea, diverging after the Iguanodontidae. A study by Huang and colleagues (2026) using an updated version of this matrix recovered a comparable clade. The results of the former study are displayed in the cladogram below:

- Hadrosauriformes
  - Iguanodontidae
    - Iguanodon bernissartensis
    - Mantellisaurus atherfieldensis
  - Hadrosauroidea
    - - Ouranosaurus nigeriensis
      - Morelladon beltrani
    - - - Cariocecus bocagei
        - - Brighstoneus simmondsi
          - Comptonatus chasei
      - - Bolong yixianensis
        - - Altirhinus kurzanovi
          - - Jinzhousaurus yangi
            - - Equijubus normani
              - - - Xuwulong yueluni
                  - Jintasaurus meniscus
                - - Batyrosaurus rozhdestvenskyi
                  - - Probactrosaurus gobiensis
                    - Hadrosauromorpha
                      ⊞ ⇒
                      - Gongpoquansaurus mazongshanensis
                      - - Eolambia caroljonesa
                        - - - Protohadros byrdi
                            - Jeyawati rugoculus
                          - - Plesiohadros
                            - - - Gilmoreosaurus mongoliensis
                                - Bactrosaurus johnsoni
                              - - Levnesovia transoxiana
                                - - Eotrachodon orientalis
                                  - Telmatosaurus transsylvanicus
                                  - Tanius sinensis
                                  - Tethyshadros insularis
                                  - - - Tethyshadros insularis
                                      - Huehuecanauhtlus tiquichensis
                                    - - Hadrosauridae
                      ⊟

== Paleoenvironment ==
Comptonatus is one of several iguanodontians known from the Isle of Wight, distinct from Iguanodon, Brighstoneus, and Mantellisaurus. The deposition of the Wessex Formation likely spans several million years, and so it is unlikely to have been contemporaneous with all of these other taxa. The Wessex Formation had a warm and semi-arid Mediterranean climate, formed on alluvial meander plains. Forests on higher ground north of the floodplain consisted of Pinophyta, Ginkgophyta, Pteridophyta, Cycadophyta. Forest fires and floods were common occurrences, resulting in the formation of plant debris beds.
