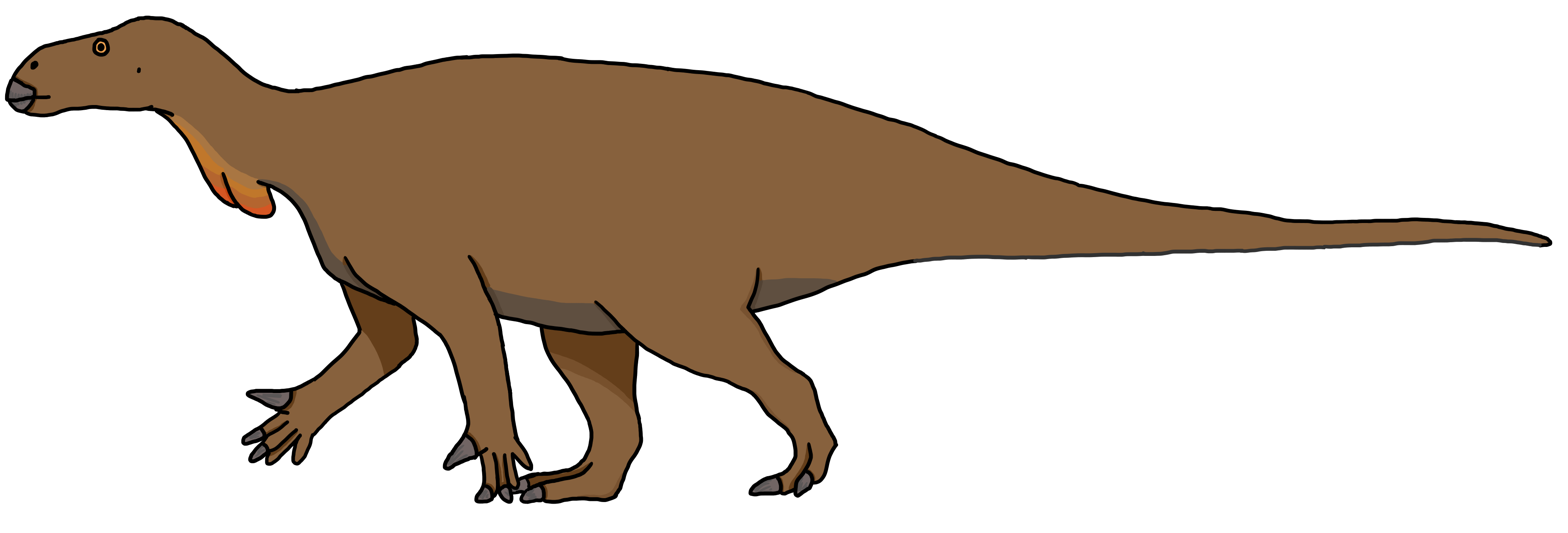
- Hypothetical restoration

Scientific classification
- Domain: Eukaryota
- Kingdom: Animalia
- Phylum: Chordata
- Clade: Dinosauria
- Clade: †Ornithischia
- Clade: †Ornithopoda
- Clade: †Styracosterna
- Genus: †Bayannurosaurus; Xu et al, 2018

Type species
- †Bayannurosaurus perfectus Xu et al, 2018

= Bayannurosaurus =

Bayannurosaurus Temporal range: Aptian, 124 Ma

Extinct genus of reptiles

Bayannurosaurus is a non-hadrosauriform ankylopollexian ornithopod described in 2018 by Xu Xing. It lived during the early Aptian period, being found in the Bayin-Gobi Formation of China. The genus includes the type species Bayannurosaurus perfectus. A phylogenetic analysis of Bayannurosaurus indicates that it is more derived than Hypselospinus, yet less derived than Ouranosaurus and just outside of the Hadrosauriformes. It was a large iguanodontian, measuring up to 9 metres (30 ft) in total body length. The genus name Bayannurosaurus comes from Bayannur, the area where it was found, while the species name perfectus comes from the "perfect" preservation of the holotype specimen (IMMNH PV00001).

== Discovery and naming ==
In the summer of 2013 a joint expedition of the Long Hao Institute of Geology and Paleontology and the Institute of Vertebrate Paleontology and Paleoanthropology explored the Chulumiao locality of Bayannur, China. This locality is at the middle of the upper half of the Bayingebi Formation, giving it an early Aptian age, and the expedition collected a very well-preserved and nearly complete skeleton of an iguanodontian. This skeleton, housed as the Inner Mongolia Museum of Natural History as IMMNH PV00001, was described in 2018 by Chinese paleontologist Xu Xing and colleagues, who gave it the name Bayannurosaurus perfectus. The genus name is a combination of the geographical area Bayannur where it was found, and the Ancient Greek word σαυρος (sauros) for "lizard", while the specific name is in reference to the "perfect" preservation of the holotype skeleton. Known only from the holotype IMMNH PV00001, Bayannurosaurus is represented by a nearly complete, partially articulated skeleton preserving all regions of anatomy including the entire tail.

== Classification ==
Bayannurosaurus shows a combination of features that place it as an intermediate form of Ankylopollexia, transitional between earlier members and hadrosauriforms. It was recovered in the phylogenetic analysis of Xu and colleagues to be between Hypselospinus and Ouranosaurus, as one of the few early ankylopollexians from Asia. From their results, the origins of Ankylopollexia would have been in North America in the Late Jurassic, before a dispersion to Europe during the Early Cretaceous. Bayannurosaurus and Lanzhousaurus would be the result of allopatric speciation in Asia distinct from the later immigration to Asia around the origins of Hadrosauroidea. Their cladogram is below.

- Ankylopollexia
  - Camptosaurus
  - - Styracosterna
      - Uteodon
      - - Dakotadon
        - - Hippodraco
          - - Iguanacolossus
            - - Proa valdearinnoensis
              - - Lanzhousaurus
                - - Hypselospinus
                  - - Bayannurosaurus
                    - - Ouranosaurus
                      - - Hadrosauriformes
                          - Iguanodontidae
                          - Hadrosauroidea
