= Cariocecus =

Iberian god of war

Cariocecus or Cariociecus was the god of war in the mythology of various Iberian tribes, in the region then known as Hispania. Through conquest and cultural overlay, he became syncretised with the Ancient Rome god Mars and the Ancient Greek god Ares.

The Lusitanians practiced human sacrifice and when a priest wounded a prisoner in the stomach they made predictions by the way the victim fell down and by the appearance of the victim's innards. Sacrifices were not limited to prisoners but also included animals, horses and goats specifically. That was confirmed by Strabo: "They offer a goat and prisoners and horses". The Lusitanians cut the right hand of prisoners and consecrated it to Cariocecus.
