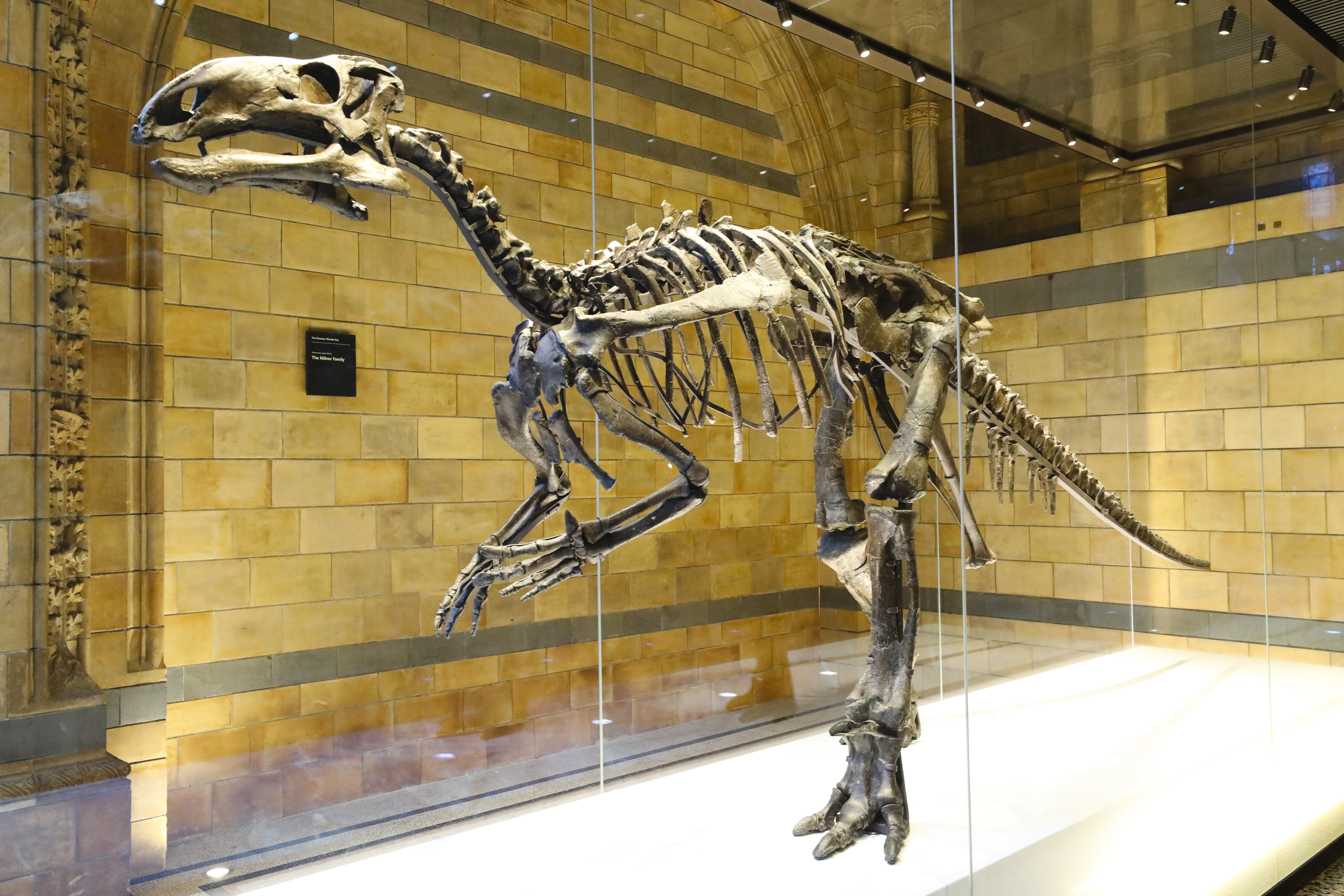
- Holotype skeleton (NHMUK PV R5764), Natural History Museum, London

Scientific classification
- Kingdom: Animalia
- Phylum: Chordata
- Class: Reptilia
- Clade: Dinosauria
- Clade: †Ornithischia
- Clade: †Ornithopoda
- Clade: †Hadrosauriformes
- Genus: †Mantellisaurus; Paul, 2007
- Species: †M. atherfieldensis

Binomial name
- †Mantellisaurus atherfieldensis (Hooley, 1925)

Synonyms
- Heterosaurus neocomiensis? Cornuel, 1850; Vectisaurus valdensis Hulke, 1879; Iguanodon atherfieldensis Hooley, 1925; Dollodon bampingi Paul, 2008; Proplanicoxa galtoni Carpenter & Ishida, 2010; Mantellodon carpenteri Paul, 2012

= Mantellisaurus =

Mantellisaurus Temporal range: Early Cretaceous, Barremian to early Aptian 130–120 Ma

Extinct genus of dinosaurs

Mantellisaurus is a genus of iguanodontian dinosaur that lived in the Barremian and early Aptian ages of the Early Cretaceous Period of Europe. Its remains are known from Belgium (Bernissart), England, Spain and Germany. The type and only species is M. atherfieldensis. Formerly known as Iguanodon atherfieldensis, the new genus Mantellisaurus was erected for the species by Gregory Paul in 2007. According to Paul, Mantellisaurus was more lightly built than Iguanodon and more closely related to Ouranosaurus, making Iguanodon in its traditional sense paraphyletic. It is known from many complete and almost complete skeletons. The genus name honours Gideon Mantell, the discoverer of Iguanodon.

== History of discovery ==
=== Discovery and naming of the holotype ===
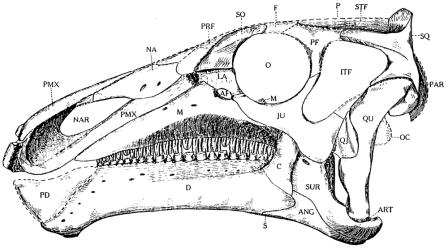
Drawing of the holotype skull from Hooley's original description

The holotype fossil, NHMUK PV R5764, was originally discovered by Reginald Walter Hooley in 1914 in the upper Vectis Formation of southern England and reported upon in 1917. He posthumously named it Iguanodon atherfieldensis in 1925. Atherfield is the name of a village on the southwest shore of the Isle of Wight where the fossil was found.

=== The Maidstone specimen and "Mantellodon" ===
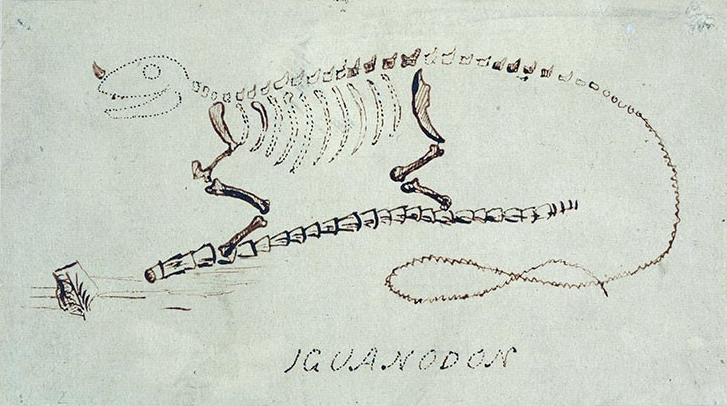
Mantell's "Iguanodon" restoration based on the Maidstone Mantellodon remains

The Maidstone specimen was discovered in a quarry in Maidstone, Kent, owned by William Harding Bensted, in February 1834 (lower Lower Greensand Formation). In June 1834 it was acquired for £25 by scientist Gideon Mantell. He was led to identify it as an Iguanodon based on its distinctive teeth. The Maidstone slab was utilized in the first skeletal reconstructions and artistic renderings of Iguanodon, but due to its incompleteness, Mantell made some mistakes, the most famous of which was the placement of what he thought was a horn on the nose.

Shortly after the discovery, tension began to build between Mantell and Richard Owen, an ambitious scientist with much better funding and society connections in the turbulent worlds of Reform Act–era British politics and science. Owen, at the time a firm creationist, opposed the early versions of evolutionary science ("transmutationism") then being debated and used what he would soon coin as dinosaurs as a weapon in this conflict. With the paper describing Dinosauria, he scaled down dinosaurs from lengths of over 61 metres (200 ft), determined that they were not simply giant lizards, and put forward that they were advanced and mammal-like, characteristics given to them by God; according to the understanding of the time, they could not have been "transmuted" from reptiles to mammal-like creatures.

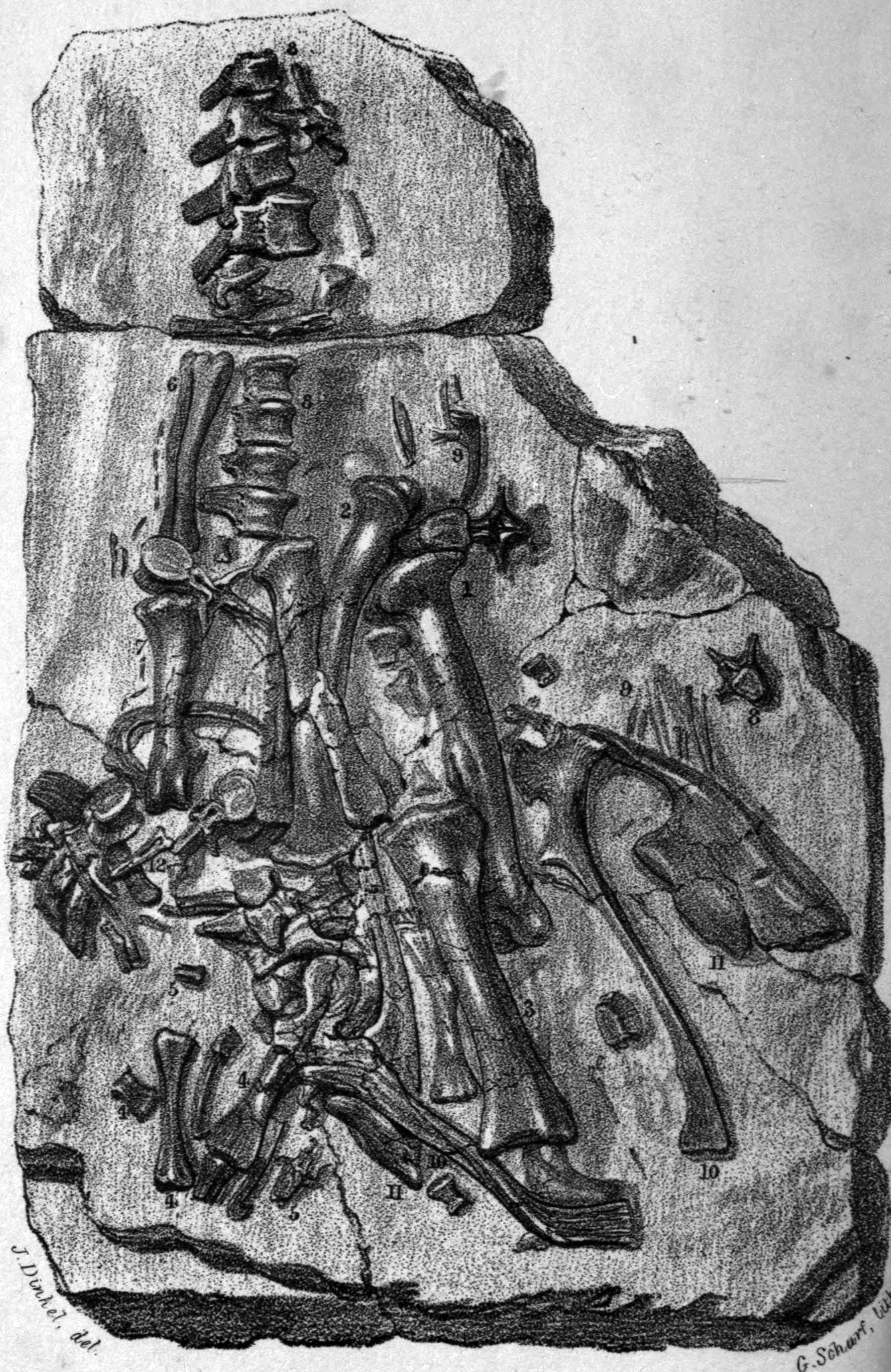
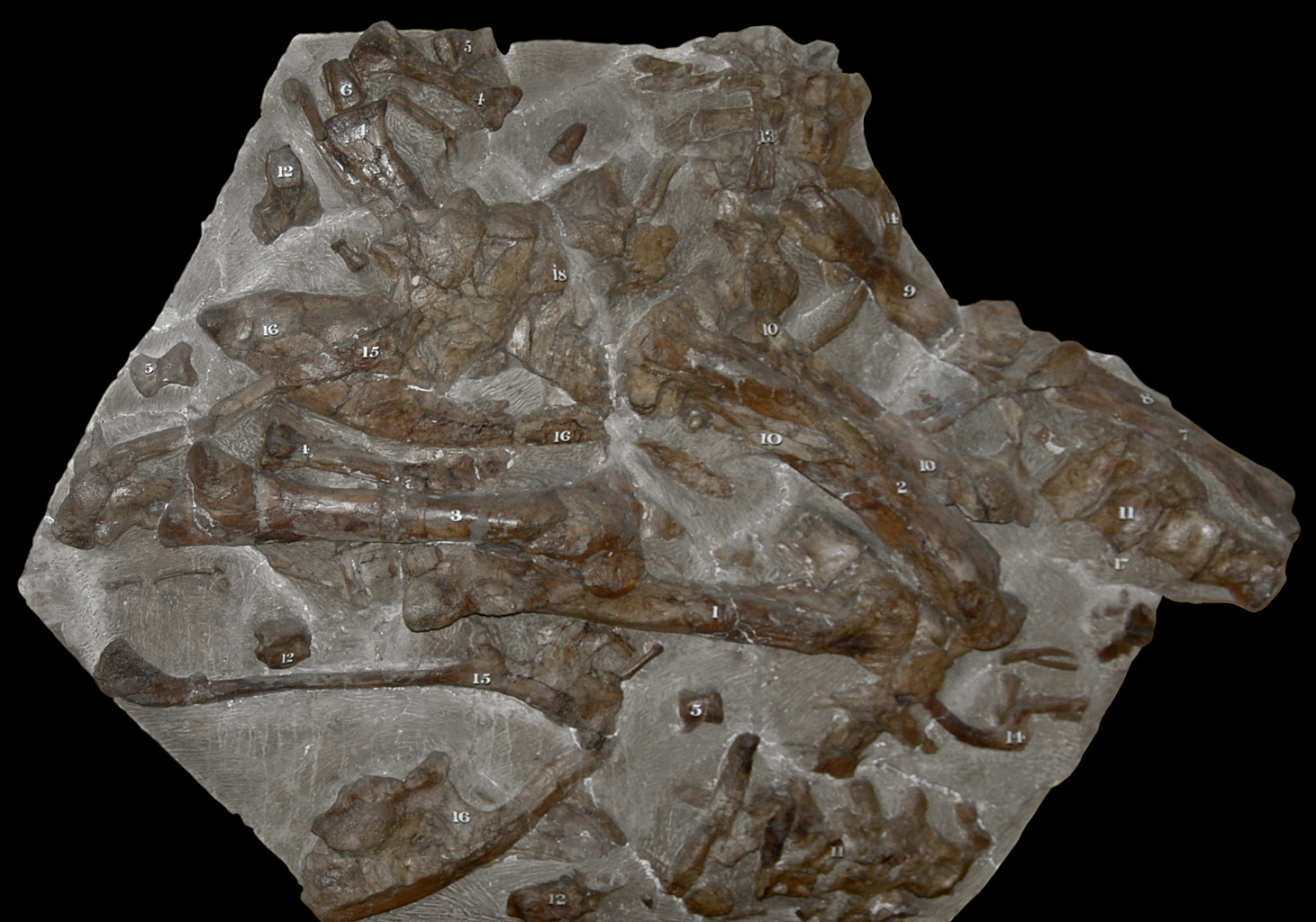
Lithograph and photo of the Maidstone specimen

In 1849, a few years before his death in 1852, Mantell realised that the genus today known as Mantellodon was not a heavy, pachyderm-like animal, as Owen was putting forward, but had slender forelimbs; however, his passing left him unable to participate in the creation of the Crystal Palace dinosaur sculptures, and so Owen's vision of the dinosaurs became that seen by the public for decades. With Benjamin Waterhouse Hawkins, Owen had nearly two dozen lifesize sculptures of various prehistoric animals built out of concrete sculpted over a steel and brick framework; two Mantellodon, one standing and one resting on its belly, were included. Before the sculpture of the standing Mantellodon was completed, a banquet for twenty was held inside it.

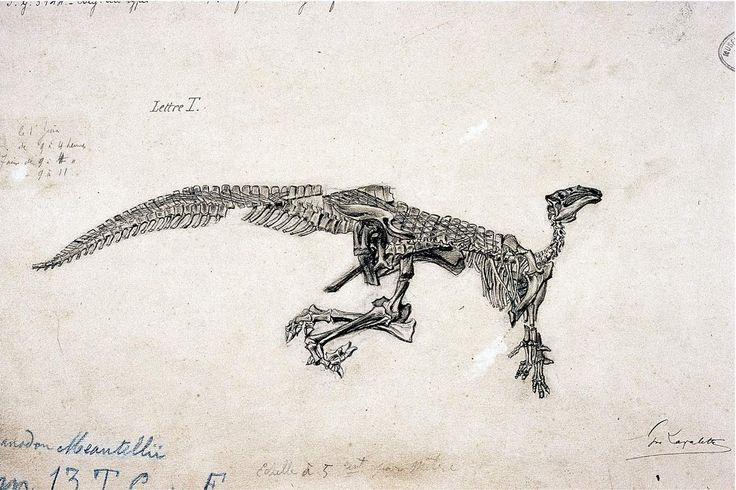
Belgian specimen as excavated

The discovery of much better specimens of Iguanodon bernissartensis in later years revealed that the horn was actually a modified thumb. Still encased in rock, the Maidstone skeleton is currently displayed at the Natural History Museum in London. The borough of Maidstone commemorated this find by adding an Iguanodon as a supporter to their coat of arms in 1949. This specimen has become linked with the name I. mantelli, a species named in 1832 by Christian Erich Hermann von Meyer in place of I. anglicus, but it actually comes from a different formation than the original I. mantelli/I. anglicus material. The Maidstone specimen, also known as Gideon Mantell's "Mantel-piece" and formally labelled as NHMUK 3741, was subsequently excluded from Iguanodon.

It was classified as cf. Mantellisaurus by McDonald (2012), as cf. Mantellisaurus atherfieldensis by David Bruce Norman (2012), and made the holotype of a separate genus and species Mantellodon carpenteri by Gregory S. Paul (2012). The generic name combines Mantell's name with a Greek odon, "tooth", analogous to Iguanodon. The specific name honours Kenneth Carpenter for his work on dinosaurs in general and iguandonts in particular. David Norman, in 2013, considered Paul's description of Mantellodon to be inadequate, identical to that given by Paul of Darwinsaurus and entirely incorrect, noting that no dentary is preserved in the holotype specimen, and that the preserved forelimb elements "are gracile, carpals are not preserved, the metacarpals are elongate and slender, and a thumb spike is not preserved". Norman considered the holotype specimen of Mantellodon carpenteri to be referable to the species Mantellisaurus atherfieldensis.

In 2021, a sculpture nicknamed Iggy the Iguanodon based on the Maidstone specimen was unveiled at the Maidstone East station. The dinosaur is also featured in Maidstone's coat of arms, and is the only dinosaur featured in a borough's coat of arms in the UK.

=== Specimen IRSNB 1551 and "Dollodon" ===
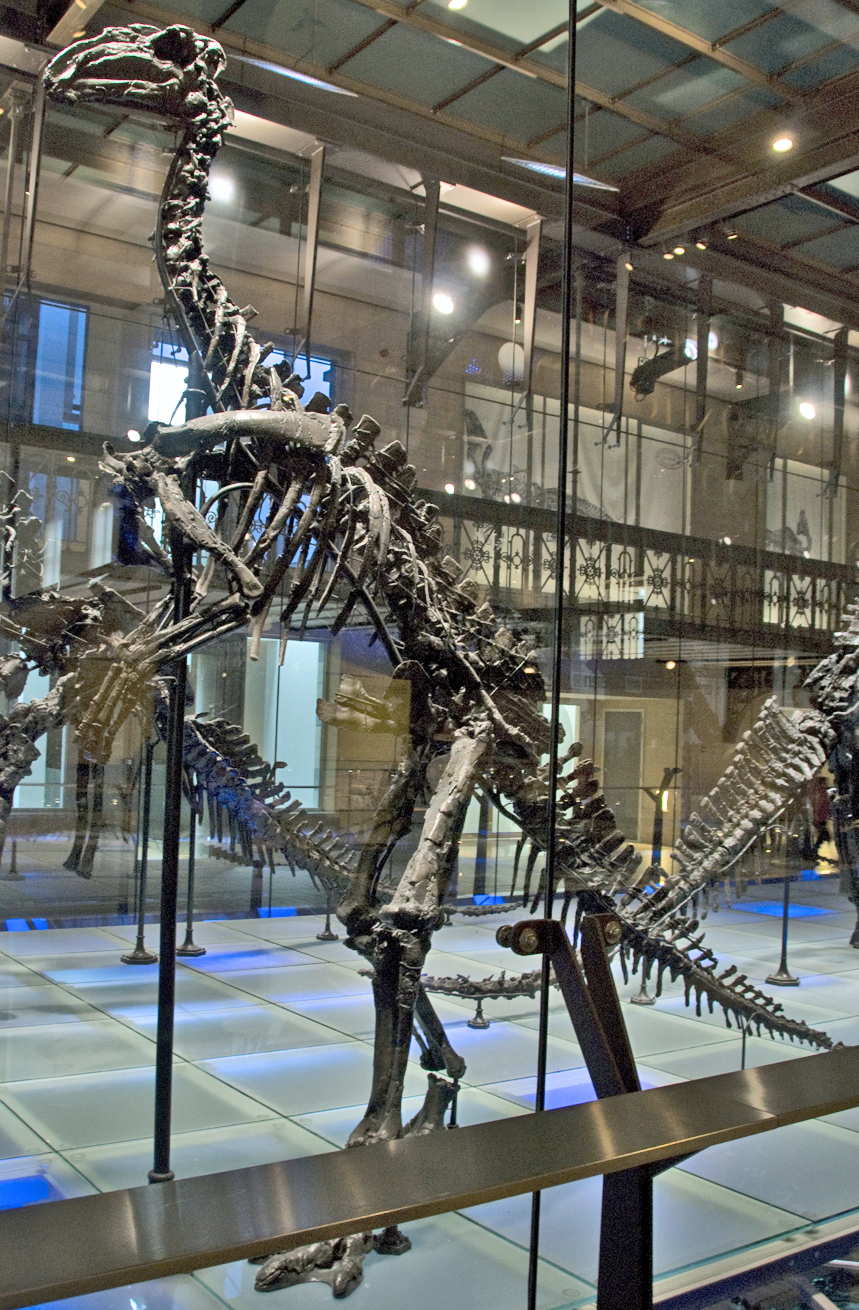
One of the first-ever mounted dinosaur specimens (IRSNB 1551), Royal Belgian Institute of Natural Sciences

Specimen IRSNB 1551 from the Sainte-Barbe Clays, Belgium, became the second mounted skeleton of a non-avian dinosaur made primarily out of actual bone when put on display by Louis Dollo in 1884. This specimen was originally assigned to Iguanodon mantelli by George Albert Boulenger in 1881, but was in 1986 thought to pertain to Iguanodon atherfieldensis by David Bruce Norman. The specimen was assigned to its own genus and species, Dollodon bampingi, by Gregory S. Paul in 2008. The genus was named after Dollo, who first described the remains, and the specific name was in honour of popular science writer Daniel Bamping, who assisted Paul in his investigations.

Paul noted several differences between the Mantellisaurus type (NHMUK R5764) and IRSNB 1551. The Mantellisaurus type had proportionally shorter forelimbs with a larger pelvis and he argued it was probably more bipedal, whereas IRSNB 1551 was more likely to be quadrupedal. Paul also noted that the snout and trunk of IRSNB 1551 were proportionally longer than the Mantellisaurus type specimen.

The validity of Dollodon has since been disputed. In 2010, Kenneth Carpenter and Yusuke Ishida synonymized Dollodon bampingi with Iguanodon seelyi, a species based on BMNH R 28685 from Wessex Formation, England. Likewise, David B. Norman and Andrew McDonald do not consider Dollodon a valid genus or species and instead include it with Mantellisaurus.

=== Sauerland specimens ===
In 1971, a fossiliferous karstic sinkhole clay deposit was found at a quarry just south-west of the village of Nehden near Brilon in Sauerland, Germany containing numerous disarticulated iguanodontid remains predominantly of Mantellisaurus with lesser quantities of Iguanodon, alongside other fragmentary dinosaur and crocodylian material.

=== Iberian specimens ===
Mantellisaurus is known from several localities in Spain, with an articulated hindlimb known from Las Hoyas and a specimen known from the Rubielos de Mora 1 locality in Spain. Three specimens are known from the Arcillas de Morella Formation.

== Description ==
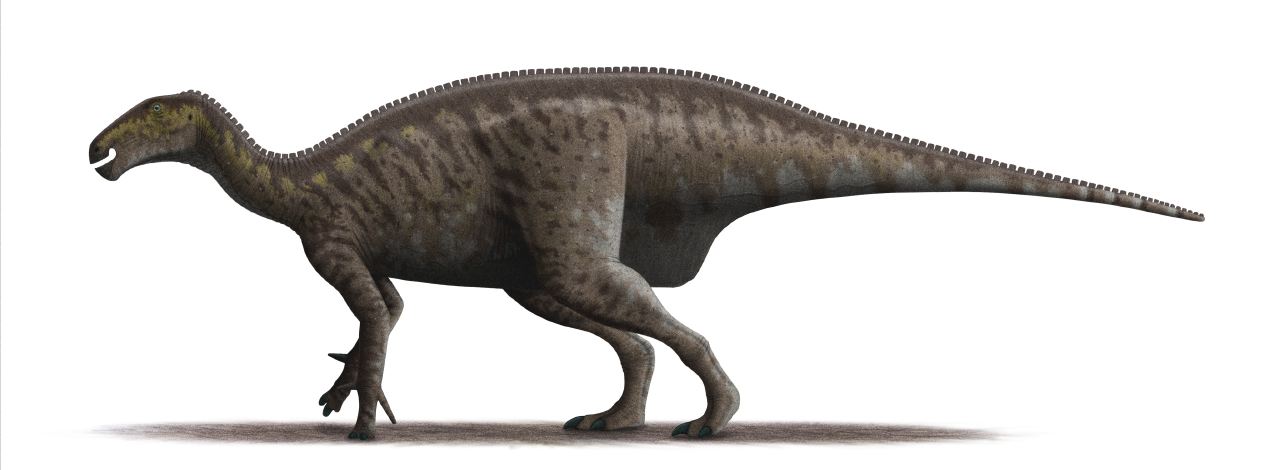
Restoration based on the holotype specimen, NHMUK R5764.

Size comparison

Mantellisaurus was a lightly constructed iguanodont. Compared to Iguanodon bernissartensis, Mantellisaurus was smaller, estimated at 750 kilograms (1,650 lb) in weight. Its forelimbs were proportionally shorter than those of I. bernissartensis. In Mantellisaurus the forelimbs were about half the length of the hindlimbs whereas they were about 70 percent the length of the hindlimbs in I. bernissartensis. Due to the short length of its forelimbs and the shortness of its body, Paul proposed that it was primarily bipedal, only going on all fours when standing still or moving slowly.

== Classification ==
The cladogram below follows an analysis by Sacamoto and colleagues, 2026.

- Iguanodontia
  - Uteodon
  - - Camptosaurus
    - Styracosterna
      - Dakotadon
      - - - Theiophytalia
          - Owenodon
          - Cumnoria
        - - Iguanacolossus
          - - Lanzhousaurus
            - - - Hippodraco
                - Bolong
              - - - Ouranosaurus
                  - - - Hypselospinus
                      - Barilium
                    - - Lurdusaurus
                      - Cedrorestes
                - Hadrosauriformes
                  - - Jinzhousaurus
                    - - - Iguanodon
                        - Equijubus
                      - - Proa
                        - Fukuisaurus
                  - Hadrosauroidea
                    - - Comptonatus
                      - - Mantellisaurus
                        - Brighstoneus
                    - - Hadrosauromorpha
                      - - Kukufeldia
                        - - Xuwulong
                          - - Istiorachis
                            - Paludohadros

== Literature ==
- Cornuel, M., 1850, Note sur des ossements fossiles decouvertes dans le calcaire neocomien de Wassy (Haute-Marne): Bulletin de la societie geologiques de France, 2nd series, v. 7, p. 702-704.
- Hooley, W., 1925, On the skeleton of Iguanodon atherfieldensis sp. nov., from the Wealden Shales of Atherfield (Isle of Wight): Quarterly Journal of the Geological Society of London, v. 81, p. 1-61.
- Hulke, J. W., 1879, Vectisaurus valdensis, a new Wealden Dinosaur: Quarterly Journal of the Geological Society of London, v. 35, p. 421-424.
- Owen, R., 1842, Report on British Fossil Reptiles. Part II: Report of the British Association for the Advancement of Science, v. 11, p. 60-204.
- Lydekker, R., 1888, Catalogue of the Fossil Reptilia and Amphibia in the British Museum (Natural History), Cromwell Road, S.W., Part 1. Containing the Orders Ornithosauria, Crocodilia, Dinosauria, Squamta, Rhynchocephalia, and Proterosauria: British Museum of Natural History, London, 309pp.
- Norman, D.B., 2012. "Iguanodontian Taxa (Dinosauria: Ornithischia) from the Lower Cretaceous of England and Belgium". In: Pascal Godefroit (ed.), Bernissart Dinosaurs and Early Cretaceous Terrestrial Ecosystems. Indiana University Press. 464 pp. http://www.iupress.indiana.edu/product_info.php?products_id=800408
- Paul, G.S. 2007. Turning the old into the new: a separate genus for the gracile iguanodont from the Wealden of England; pp. 69–77 in K. Carpenter (ed.), Horns and Beaks: Ceratopsian and Ornithopod Dinosaurs. Indiana University Press, Bloomington.
- Bonsor, J. A., Lockwood, J. A. F., Leite, J. V., Scott-Murray, A., & Maidment, S. C. R. (2023) The Osteology of the Holotype of the British Iguanodontian Dinosaur Mantellisaurus atherfieldensis, Monographs of the Palaeontographical Society, 177:665, 1-63, DOI: 10.1080/02693445.2023.2234156 https://www.tandfonline.com/doi/abs/10.1080/02693445.2023.2234156
