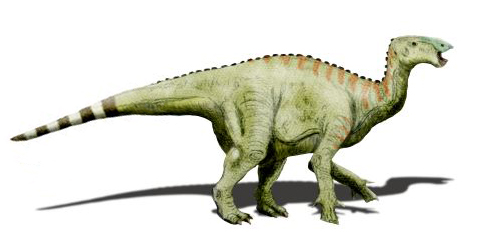
- Life restoration

Scientific classification
- Kingdom: Animalia
- Phylum: Chordata
- Class: Reptilia
- Clade: Dinosauria
- Clade: †Ornithischia
- Clade: †Ornithopoda
- Clade: †Ankylopollexia
- Clade: †Styracosterna
- Genus: †Hypselospinus; Norman, 2010
- Species: †H. fittoni

Binomial name
- †Hypselospinus fittoni (Lydekker, 1889 [originally Iguanodon fittoni])

Synonyms
- Wadhurstia fittoni Carpenter & Ishida, 2010; Darwinsaurus evolutionis? Paul, 2012; Huxleysaurus hollingtoniensis Paul, 2012

= Hypselospinus =

Hypselospinus Temporal range: early Valanginian ~140 Ma

Extinct genus of dinosaurs

Hypselospinus is a genus of iguanodontian dinosaur which was first described as a species of Iguanodon (I. fittoni) by Richard Lydekker in 1889, the specific name honouring William Henry Fitton.

== History and naming ==
In the 1880s, the Natural History Museum, London, purchased multiple collections of fossils discovered by Charles Dawson from the region Hastings. Among these collections of specimens were multiple individuals identified as species of Iguanodon by British palaeontologist Richard Lydekker, from the Early Cretaceous Wadhurst Clay Formation. The first of these specimens, NHMUK R.1635, was found in Shornden Quarry over distance of 46 m (50 yd), and includes a partial sacrum and pelvis believed to be from a single individual. As the specimen was smaller than and younger than the similar and nearby species Iguanodon dawsoni and the pelvis showed some differences, Lydekker chose to name the new species Iguanodon fittoni in 1889, with the species name honouring William Henry Fitton who had worked in the Early Cretaceous strata of England.

As well as I. fittoni, Lydekker identified another new species of Iguanodon, I. hollingtoniensis, from among the material collected by Dawson in Hollington Quarry near Hastings. Also from the Wadhurst Clay Formation, Lydekker identified a series of specimens (NHMUK R.1148, R.1629, and R.1632) as being from the same individual. While he had previously considered NHMUK R.1148, a partial right leg, as I. dawsoni, based on its smaller size and differences in the femur he chose to name the new species in 1889. Lydekker also assigned to I. hollingtoniensis a single individual bearing the specimen numbers NHMUK R.811, R.811b, and R.604, and identified the partial skeleton NHMUK R.33 as belonging to either I. fittoni or I. hollingtoniensis though he could not identify which.

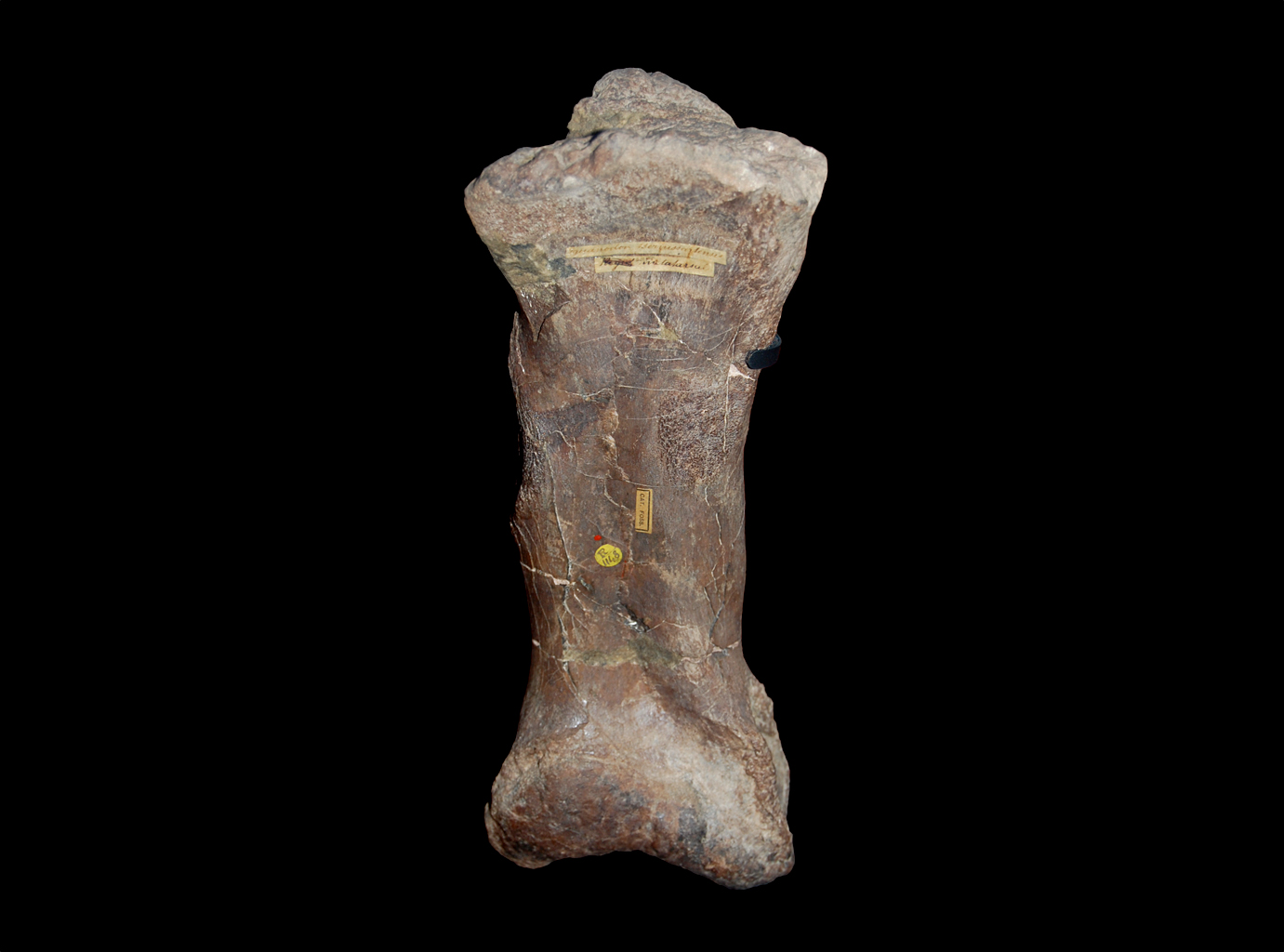
Metatarsal III foot bone of specimen NHMUK R1148n (formerly assigned to its own genus, Huxleysaurus)

Lydekker elaborated further upon his classifications of Iguanodon fittoni and I. hollingtoniensis in 1890, describing them as members of a "proiguanodont" group along with I. dawsoni. The type specimen of I. fittoni was identified as a series of NHMUK R.1635 to R.1635d, all purchased from Dawson in 1889 and including portions of the sacrum, pelvis, a caudal vertebra and three teeth. The type specimens of I. hollingtoniensis included NHMUK R.1148, R.1629, R.1632, R.1632a, and R.1632b, covering many regions of the skeleton including the neck, tail, and both fore- and hindlimbs. NHMUK R.604, R.811, R.811b, R.1634, and R.1636 were all referred, coming from either the Hollington or Shornden Quarries and including regions of the skeleton also found in the types. Many specimens were previously referred to I. dawsoni, but considered by Lydekker as more similar to I. hollongtoniensis. Lydekker also illustrated the ilium and femur of I. fittoni and I. hollingtoniensis in comparison to the other species of Iguanodon.

British palaeontologist David B. Norman was the first to suggest that I. fittoni and I. hollingtoniensis could represent the same taxon in 1987, with I. fittoni taking priority as it was described one page before I. hollingtoniensis. Together, I. fittoni and I. dawsoni would be the two iguanodonts from the Wadhurst Clay Formation, both found at Shornden and other sites and from the same Valanginian age. The material of I. fittoni, including I. hollingtoniensis, was misidentified as three partial skulls and jaws in 1990 and 2004 reviews. Not all authors agreed on the inclusion of I. hollingtoniensis within I. fittoni, with American palaeontologist Gregory S. Paul in 2008, and British palaeontologist Peter M. Galton in 2009 retaining the species as separate, and as potentially belonging in a new genus separate from Iguanodon.

In May 2010 the fossils comprising Hypselospinus were by David Norman reclassified as a separate genus, among them the holotype BMNH R1635, consisting of a left ilium, a sacrum, tail vertebrae and teeth. The generic name is derived from Greek hypselos, "high" and Latin spina, "thorn", in reference to the high vertebral spines. Later that same year, a second group of scientists independently re-classified I. fittoni into a new genus they named Wadhurstia, which thus is a junior objective synonym of Hypselospinus. Hypselospinus lived during the lower Valanginian stage, around 140 million years ago. A contemporary of Barilium (also once thought to be a species of Iguanodon), Hypselospinus was a lightly built iguanodontian estimated at 6 metres (19.7 ft) long. The species Iguanodon fittoni was described from remains discovered in 1886 alongside an unnamed ichthyosaur in the lower Valanginian-age Lower Cretaceous Wadhurst Clay of Shornden, East Sussex, England. Remains from Spain may also pertain to it. Norman (2004) wrote that three partial skeletons are known for it, but this is an error.

Hypselospinus is separated from Barilium on the basis of vertebral and pelvic characters, size, and build. For example, Barilium was more robust than Hypselospinus, with large Camptosaurus-like vertebrae featuring short neural spines, whereas Hypselospinus is known for its "long, narrow, and steeply inclined neural spines".
