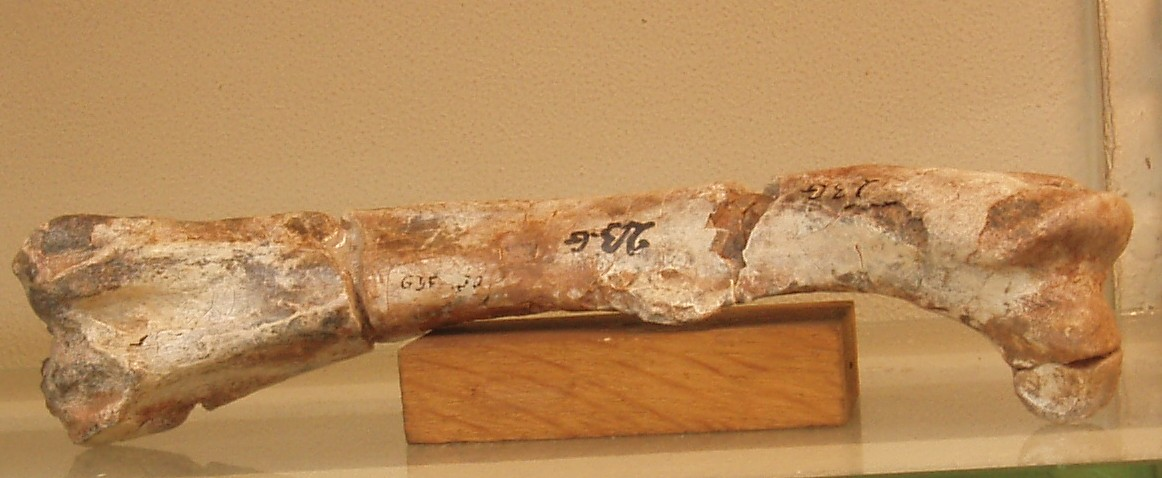
- Femur of Elrhazosaurus nigeriensis in posterior view.

Scientific classification
- Kingdom: Animalia
- Phylum: Chordata
- Class: Reptilia
- Clade: Dinosauria
- Clade: †Ornithischia
- Clade: †Ornithopoda
- Family: †Dryosauridae
- Genus: †Elrhazosaurus; Galton, 2009
- Species: †E. nigeriensis

Binomial name
- †Elrhazosaurus nigeriensis Galton, 2009 (Galton and Taquet, 1982)

Synonyms
- Valdosaurus nigeriensis Galton and Taquet, 1982

= Elrhazosaurus =

Elrhazosaurus Temporal range: Early Cretaceous, ~115 Ma

Extinct genus of dinosaurs

Elrhazosaurus (meaning "Elrhaz lizard") is a genus of basal iguanodontian dinosaur, known from isolated bones found in Early Cretaceous rocks of Niger. These bones were initially thought to belong to a species of the related dryosaurid Valdosaurus, but have since been reclassified.

== Discovery and history ==
Elrhazosaurus is based on MNHN GDF 332, a left thigh bone collected by Philippe Taquet from the upper part of the Elrhaz Formation of Gadoufaoua in the Ténéré Desert, Agadez, Niger. This rock unit dates to the late Aptian stage, approximately 115 million years ago. The bone was designated as the type specimen of a new species of Valdosaurus (V. nigeriensis) by Peter Galton and Taquet in 1982. It was differentiated from the type species V. canaliculatus by the locations of trochanters and other details. Because V. canaliculatus is known from Europe, the presence of a related species in central Africa was interpreted as evidence for a land connection between the two continents.

V. nigeriensis was given its own genus, Elrhazosaurus, by Galton in 2009. This was done on the grounds of differing morphology and geologic age versus V. canaliculatus. He retained it as a dryosaurid. While Elrhazosaurus is sometimes described as only known from thigh bones, at least one upper arm bone has been assigned to the genus.

== Paleoecology and paleobiology ==
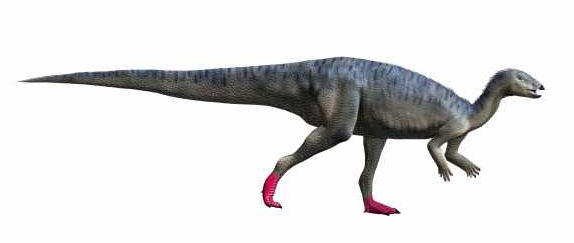
Life restoration of E. nigeriensis

The Elrhaz Formation is mostly made up of fluvial sandstones. A diverse assemblage of fossil animals has been recovered, including freshwater bivalves, hybodont sharks, bony fish, turtles, several genera of crocodylomorphs (Anatosuchus, Araripesuchus, Sarcosuchus, and Stolokrosuchus), undescribed ornithocheirid pterosaurs, the theropod dinosaurs Eocarcharia, Kryptops, Suchomimus, and an undescribed noasaurid, the sauropods Nigersaurus and an undescribed titanosaurian, and the iguanodontians Lurdusaurus and Ouranosaurus. As a dryosaurid iguanodontian, Elrhazosaurus would have been a lightly built herbivorous bipedal runner.
