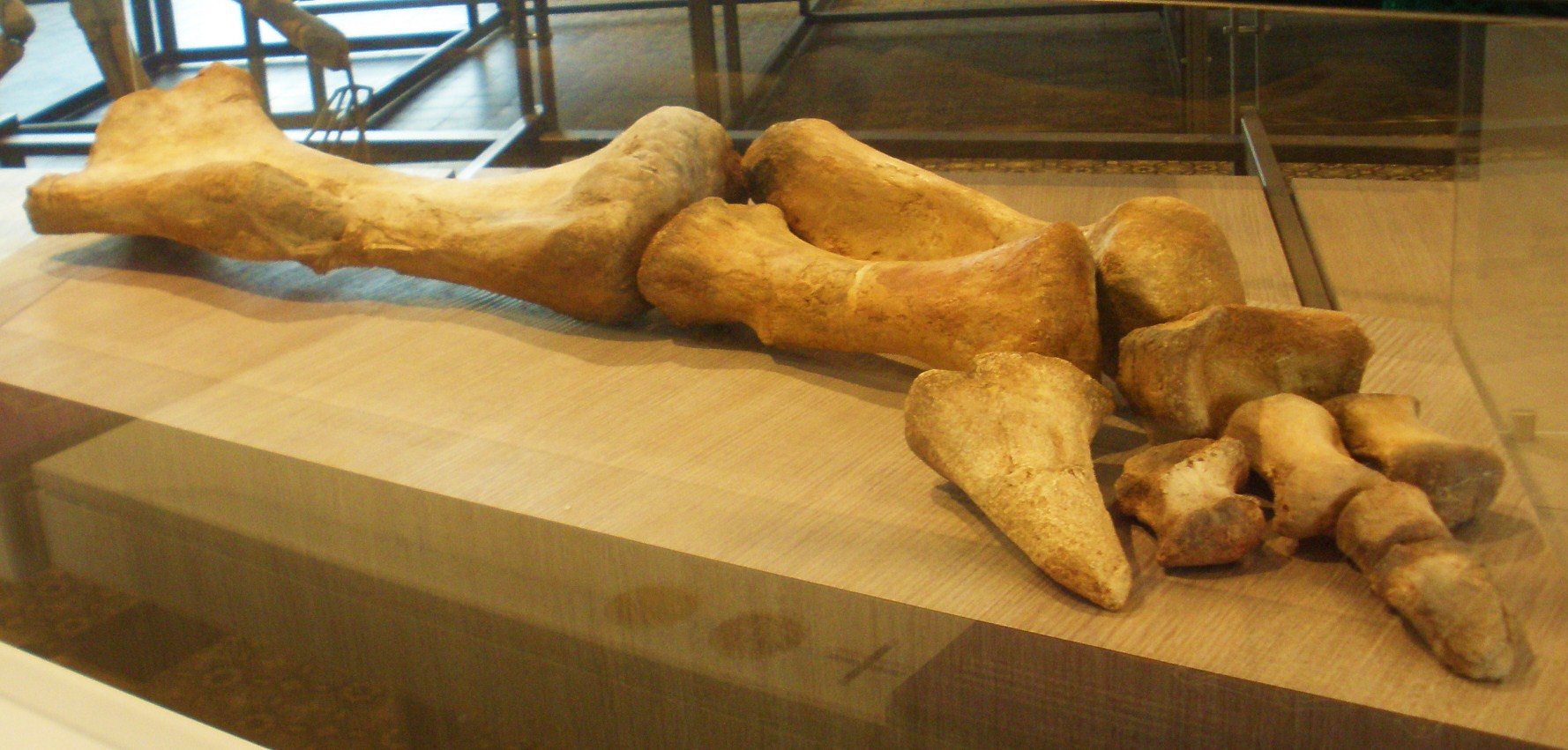
- Cast of Lurdusaurus forelimb at the Muséum des sciences naturelles de Belgique, Brussels

Scientific classification
- Kingdom: Animalia
- Phylum: Chordata
- Class: Reptilia
- Clade: Dinosauria
- Clade: †Ornithischia
- Clade: †Ornithopoda
- Clade: †Styracosterna
- Clade: †Hadrosauriformes
- Genus: †Lurdusaurus; Taquet and Russell, 1999
- Species: †L. arenatus

Binomial name
- †Lurdusaurus arenatus Taquet and Russell, 1999

= Lurdusaurus =

Lurdusaurus Temporal range: Early Cretaceous, 112 Ma

Extinct genus of dinosaurs

Lurdusaurus ("heavy lizard") is a genus of massive and unusually shaped iguanodont dinosaur from the Elrhaz Formation in Niger. It contains one species, L. arenatus. The formation dates to the Early Cretaceous, roughly 112 million years ago.

Lurdusaurus has a highly atypical body plan for an iguanodont, with a small skull, long neck, rotund torso, and powerful forelimbs and claws (the thumb-spike is remarkably enormous), somewhat reminiscent of a ground sloth. Lurdusaurus is estimated to have been 7–9 m (23–30 ft) long and 2 m (6 ft 7 in) high when on all-fours, but its stomach would have been only 70 cm (2 ft 4 in) off the ground. It may have weighed 2.5–5.5 t (2.8–6.1 short tons), conspicuously heavy for an iguanodontid this size. Correspondingly, Lurdusaurus may be the first ornithischian identified with graviportal anatomy, designed for moving slowly whilst supporting a heavy body mass.

Paleontologist Thomas R. Holtz Jr. speculated Lurdusaurus may have behaved much like a hippo. It lived in a forested, riverine environment alongside the iguanodonts Elrhazosaurus and Ouranosaurus, the sauropod Nigersaurus, an undescribed titanosaurid, the spinosaurid Suchomimus, the carcharodontosaurid Eocarcharia, the abelisaurid Kryptops, and the noasaurid Afromimus. The site also yielded several crocodylomorph species and a pterosaur.

== Discovery and naming ==
In 1965, Philippe Taquet discovered the holotype specimen at the Gadoufaoua site of the Elrhaz Formation, in the Tenere desert of Niger. It consists of a nearly complete adult iguanodont skeleton with a fragmentary skull belonging to single individual, which was given the catalogue number MNHN GDF 1700. He noted it had rather massive proportions, and in 1976 noted it should probably be classified into a new genus while briefly describing the material. Paleontologist Souad Chabli described the remains in 1988 for her PhD thesis, under the direction of Taquet. She named it "Gravisaurus tenerensis". However, her dissertation was never published. In 1999, Turquet and American paleontologist Dale Russell published the first formal description, naming it Lurdusaurus arenatus. The generic name comes from Latin lurdus "heavy" and Ancient Greek sauros "lizard", in reference to the enormous weight of the fossils. The specific name arenatus is Latin for "sandy" because it was found in a desert. They also referred a dentary fragment, MNHN GDF 43G, and a right coracoid, GDF 381, to the species.

== Description ==
The tip of the snout may have been about 20 cm (7.9 in) wide, and expanded back to 30 cm (1 ft). That is, like other iguanodonts, it did not have a duck-like bill. No teeth were preserved, but MNHN GDF 43G preserves the tooth sockets for 10 tooth rows within 19.5 cm (7.7 in). The quadrate bone at the base of the skull has an exceptionally low stature at 28.2 cm (11.1 in), in contrast to 489 mm (1 ft 7 in) in Mantellisaurus and 37.6 cm (1 ft 3 in) in Iguanodon. Based on the ratio between the length of the snout and the length of the rest of the skull in iguanodonts, the total length of the holotype's skull may have been 83.3 cm (2 ft 9 in) in life.

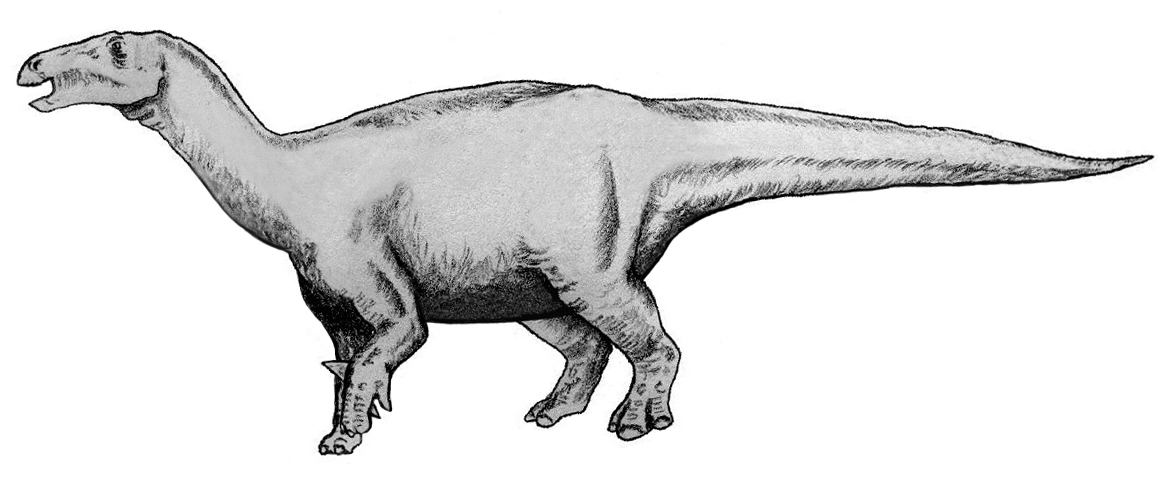
Life restoration

Lurdusaurus may have had 12 to 14 neck vertebrae. Therefore, the maximum length of the neck is 1.6 m (5 ft 3 in). The neck vertebrae are about the same size as the dorsal vertebrae (the torso, before the sacrum and pelvis), whereas those of European iguanodonts 85–90% the size of the dorsals. Because Iguanodon has 28 presacral vertebrae, Lurdusaurus potentially had at least 14 dorsals. This would make the neck proportionally quite long, as long as the dorsal series. Compared to European iguanodonts, the dorsal centra are proportionally larger and have shorter neural spines (which project straight up from the centrum) and less steep transverse processes (which project up obliquely). Like all derived iguanodonts, the sternum is hatchet-shaped, with a rod-shaped projection caudolaterally (tailwards towards the side). The sacrum, based on the scars on the ilium begotten from sacral ribs, may have measured 60 cm (2 ft). Lurdusaurus could have had 15 proximal caudal vertebra (tail vertebrae which bear transverse processes), which would have represented a third of the entire tail series.

=== Size ===
This would equate to a 4 m (13 ft) tail, and a total body length of 9 m (30 ft). It may have been 2 m (6.6 ft) tall at the hips. Based on the length of the ribs, the stomach may have been less than 70 cm (2 ft 4 in) off the ground when standing quadrupedally (on all-fours). Based on the circumferences of the limbs – 29.5 cm (1 ft) for the humerus and 45.7 cm (1 ft 6 in) for the femur – Taquet and Russell estimated that the holotype weighed approximately 5.5 t (6.1 short tons), conspicuously heavy for an ornithopod this size. In 2016, however, Gregory S. Paul proposed a significantly lower size estimate of 7 m (23 ft) in length and 2.5 t (2.8 short tons) in body mass. The headward dorsal ribs are preserved in their original positions, and show the torso was rather rotund. The diverging wings of the ilia and horizontally-orientated tailward dorsal ribs indicate a flat back about 1 m (3 ft 3 in) across.

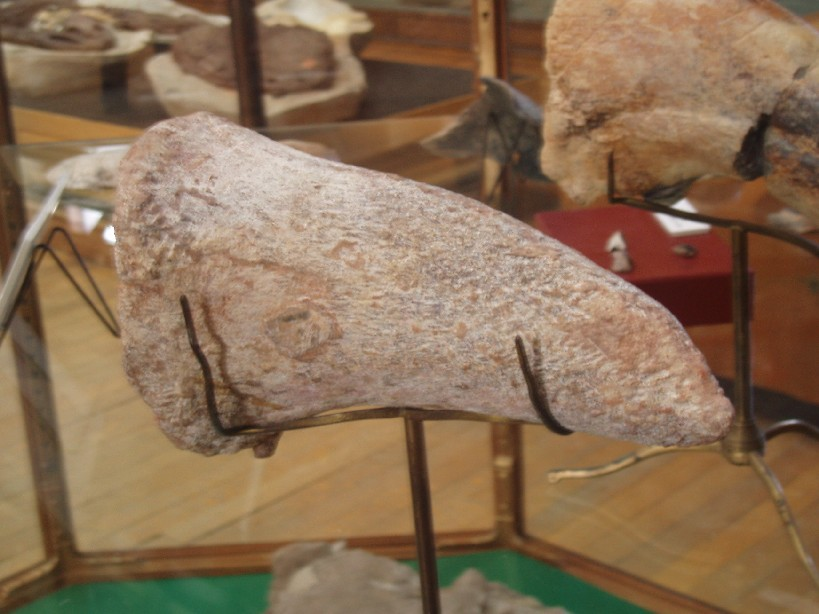
Cast of Lurdusaurus thumb spike at the Muséum National d'Histoire Naturelle, Paris

The limbs are exceptionally massive and proportionally stout. The forelimbs are 60% the size of the hindlimbs. The first metacarpal, radiale, and intermedium were together into a massive block, similar to other ankylopollexians such as Iguanodon and Ouranosaurus. Like Camptosaurus but unlike derived iguanodonts, the metacarpals (except for the thumb) were short and dumbbell-like as opposed to long and narrow. Compared to Camptosaurus, the unguals (claws) are flatter. The hand features a massive thumb spike. The pelvis is proportionally short but powerful, somewhat reminiscent of a ceratopsian pelvis. The femur slightly recurves toward the midline like in ceratopsians, and is flattened anteroposteriorly (from front to back) like in sauropods. The heavily built fourth trochanter is located on the bottom half of the femur, like Iguanodon but unlike Mantellisaurus and Ouranosaurus. The tibia is incredibly short relative to the femur, respectively 77.7 cm (2 ft 7 in) vs. 91 cm (3 ft 0 in). The metatarsals were too short to make contact with each other, and there was likely a fleshy pad to support the weight.

== Classification ==
In 1999, Taquet and Russell classified Lurdusaurus as a derived iguanodont or an intermediate between the iguanodonts and the more derived hadrosaurs, based on the presence of a posterolaterally orientated (towards the back and side) process on the sternum, slight tailward expansion of the pubis, a reduced posterior process of the pubis, and opisthocoelus (concave posterior ends) neck vertebrae and front dorsal vertebrae. They preliminarily placed it into the family Iguanodontidae, though conceded there is poor resolution on its higher classification, because the fourth trochanter is almost suspended off the femur like basal iguanodonts, but the neck vertebrae series is long like hadrosaurs. They were unable to satisfactorily explain the evolution of such an unusual body plan.

In 2004, British paleontologist David B. Norman placed it outside of Iguanodontidae but still within the clade Styracosterna, which he defined as containing all iguanodonts with a hatchet-like sternum and flattened hand claws. He agreed Lurdusaurus is a more derived iguanodont. In 2005, Chinese paleontologist You Hai-Lu and colleagues suggested that the newly discovered and massively built Lanzhousaurus from China was closely related to Lurdusaurus, and the former was basal to the latter. He classified both of them as basal styracosterns.

In 2008, American freelance researcher Gregory S. Paul argued that because Lanzhousaurus has a much deeper prepubic process, the two genera are probably not closely allied, though such hypotheses are wholly unverifiable without more complete remains. Paul agreed that Lurdusaurus is more basal to Iguanodontidae based on its short, broad hands and massive thumb spike, but he noted that the contemporary and more derived hadrosauriform Ouranosaurus has similar hand morphology. Therefore, Lurdusaurus could be a basal hadrosauriform, but Paul could not resolve the matter any further until more complete remains are discovered. In 2009, American paleontologist Peter Galton placed Lurdusaurus at the base of Styracosterna and closely allied it with the Chinese Equijubus. He classified more derived iguanodonts into the new clade Iguanodontea. In 2012, Taquet agreed with Paul that it falls outside Iguanodontidae, but was also unsure how exactly Lurdusaurus relates with other iguanodonts. The phylogenetic analysis of Karen E. Poole in 2022 found that Lurdusaurus formed a clade with other iguanodonts with robust forelimbs, Hypselospinus and Barilium.

- Styracosterna
  - Dakotadon
  - - Iguanacolossus
    - Owenodon
    - Theiophytalia
    - - Lanzhousaurus
      - - - Bolong
          - Jinzhousaurus
        - - Lurdusaurus
          - - Barilium
            - Hypselospinus
        - Ouranosaurus
        - Hippodraco
        - Xuwulong
        - Mantellisaurus
        - - Iguanodontidae
            - - Iguanodon
              - Equijubus
            - - Proa valdearinnoensis
              - Fukuisaurus
        - - Hadrosauroidea
            - Probactrosaurus
            - Batyrosaurus
            - Altirhinus
            - Jeyawati
            - - Eolambia
              - Protohadros
              - - Shuangmiaosaurus
                - Levnesovia
                - - Tethyshadros
                  - - - Bactrosaurus
                      - Gilmoreosaurus
                    - - Telmatosaurus
                      - Hadrosauridae

== Paleoecology ==
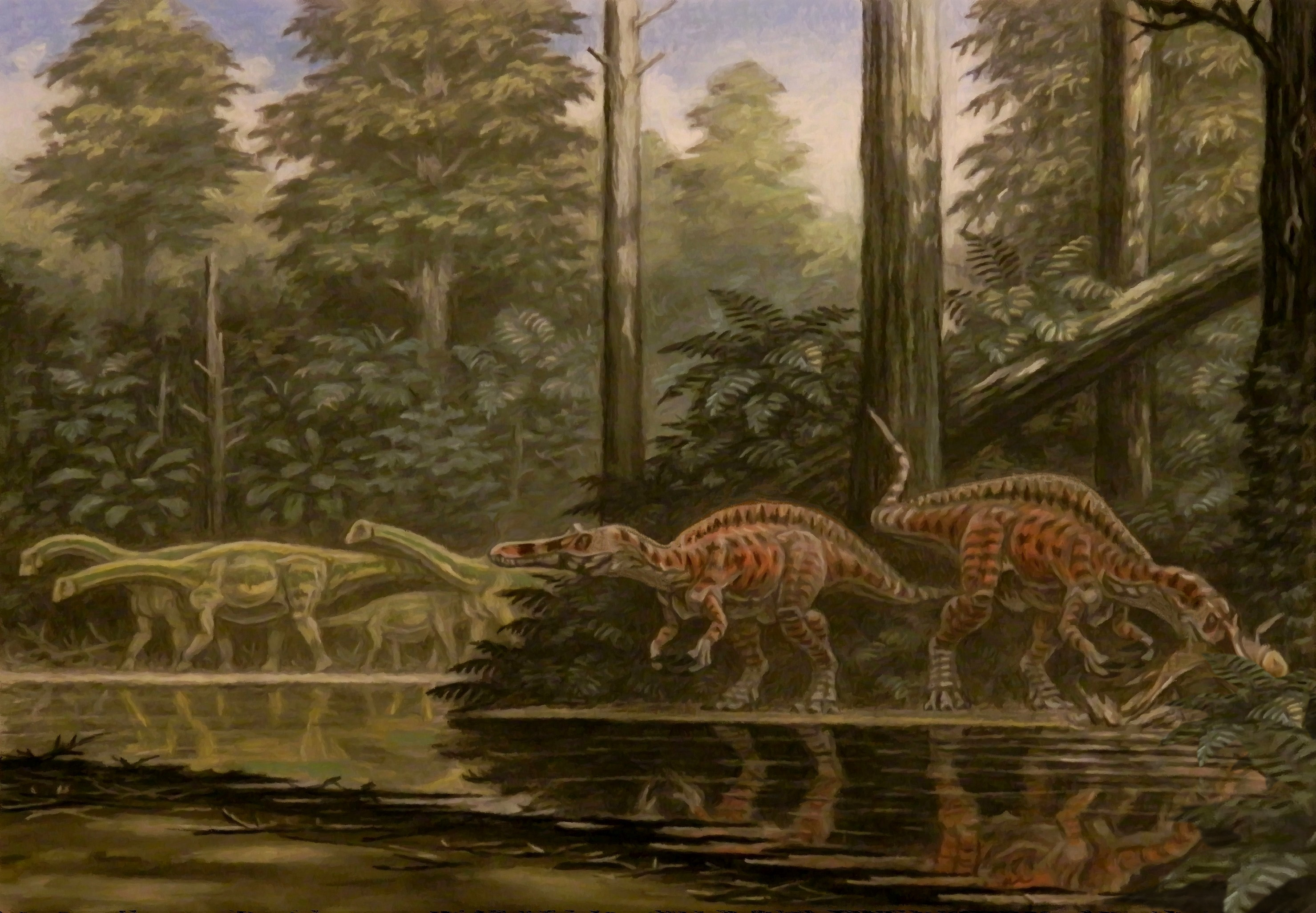
Reconstruction of the Elrhaz Formation with Nigersaurus and Suchomimus

In 2007, paleontologist Thomas R. Holtz Jr. speculated that "Lurdusaurus may have been the dinosaur equivalent to a hippo" as they both share a heavy, stocky body plan. He suggested Lurdusaurus, like the hippo, was a generally slow-moving animal on both land and water, but could reach high speeds when necessary. Generally, iguanodonts are thought to have been predominantly bipedal or facultatively bipedal, though based on a suite of osteological characteristics, Lurdusaurus may have been an obligate quadruped, and perhaps even the first graviportal ornithischian thus identified. Overall, with its unusual and massive body plan including a small skull, circular chest, powerful and clawed forearms, and flattened femora, Lurdusaurus may have been reminiscent of a ground sloth. In squatting position, it may have resembled an ankylosaur.

Taquet and Russell compared the fortified hand with its massive thumb spike to a ball-and-chain flail, and believed it was primarily used for defense.

Lurdusaurus was recovered from the Elrhaz Formation, and lived alongside the iguanodonts Ouranosaurus and Elrhazosaurus, the sauropod Nigersaurus, an undescribed titanosaurid, the spinosaurid Suchomimus, the carcharodontosaurid Eocarcharia (likely a chimaera including spinosaurid bones), the abelisaurid Kryptops, and the noasaurid Afromimus. The Gadoufaoua site has also yielded an ornithocheirid pterosaur, and the crocodylomorphs Anatosuchus, Araripesuchus, Stolokrosuchus, and the giant Sarcosuchus. It dates to roughly 112 million years ago during the Early Cretaceous at the Aptian–Albian boundary. Geologically, it is composed of almost entirely cross-bedded fluvial sandstone (the sediments were deposited by rivers), intermittently interrupted by migrating sand dunes. The presence of Nigersaurus suggests widespread forests with soft understory vegetation, such as immature ferns or horsetails.

== See also ==
- Koreaceratops
- Liaoningosaurus
- Spinosaurus
