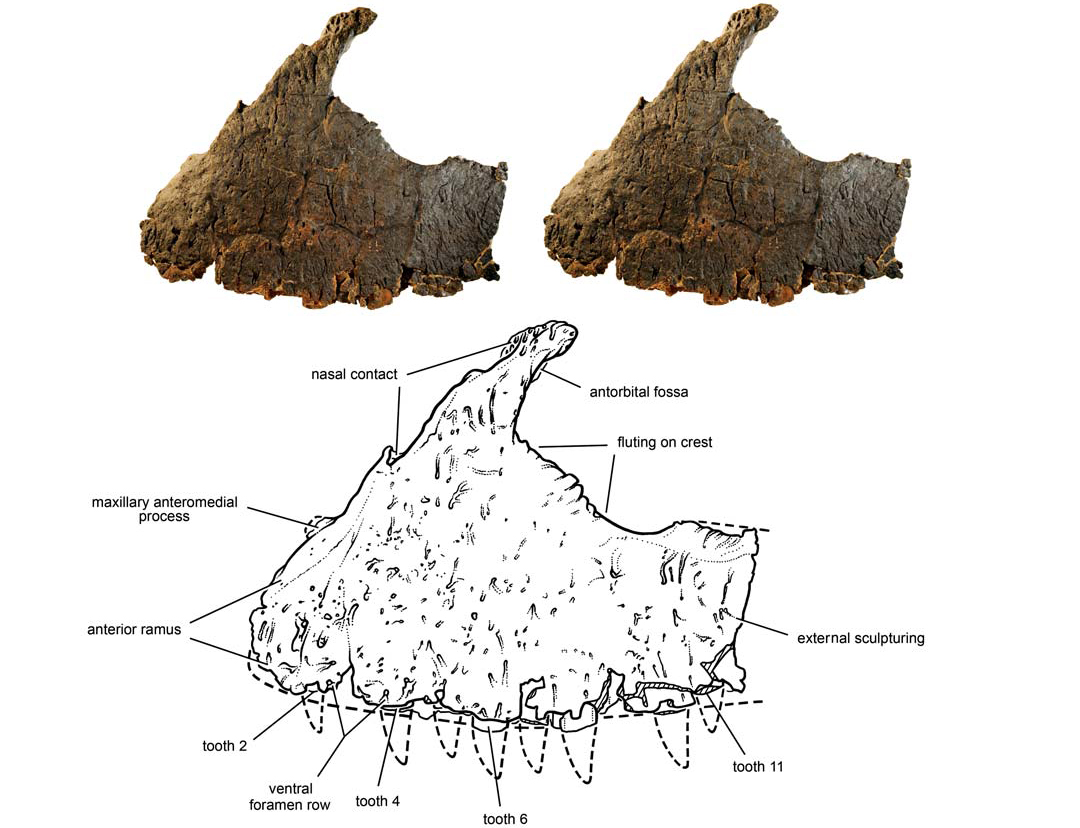
- Holotype maxilla (upper jaw bone) of Kryptops

Scientific classification
- Kingdom: Animalia
- Phylum: Chordata
- Class: Reptilia
- Clade: Dinosauria
- Clade: Saurischia
- Clade: Theropoda
- Family: †Abelisauridae
- Genus: †Kryptops; Sereno & Brusatte, 2008
- Species: †K. palaios

Binomial name
- †Kryptops palaios Sereno & Brusatte, 2008

= Kryptops =

Kryptops Temporal range: Early Cretaceous (Aptian to Albian), 115–110 Ma

Extinct genus of theropod dinosaurs

Kryptops (meaning "covered face") is an extinct genus of possibly chimeric abelisaurid theropod dinosaurs from the Early Cretaceous of Niger. It is known from a partial maxilla (upper jaw bone) found at the Gadoufaoua locality in the western Ténéré Desert, in rocks of the Aptian–Albian-age Elrhaz Formation. The fossils were collected in 2000 by a University of Chicago expedition to Niger led by American paleontologist Paul Sereno. They were then described in 2008 by Sereno and Steve Brusatte. The genus contains a single species, Kryptops palaios. Sereno and Brusatte referred several postcranial remains to Kryptops, but later studies have shown that these elements belong to an allosauroid theropod, leaving Kryptops to be only known from the incomplete maxilla.

Kryptops is one of the oldest known members of the Abelisauridae, making it vital to understanding this family's evolution. Its length is estimated to be around 6–7 m (19.7–23.0 ft), making it smaller than later genera such as Carnotaurus. Nevertheless, Kryptops is a large, carnivorous dinosaur with highly serrated teeth (bearing many denticles) and robust upper jaws. The outer surface of its maxilla features deep striations, grooves, and rugosities, indicating it was covered in a tightly adhering integumentary structure like keratin.

== Discovery and naming ==
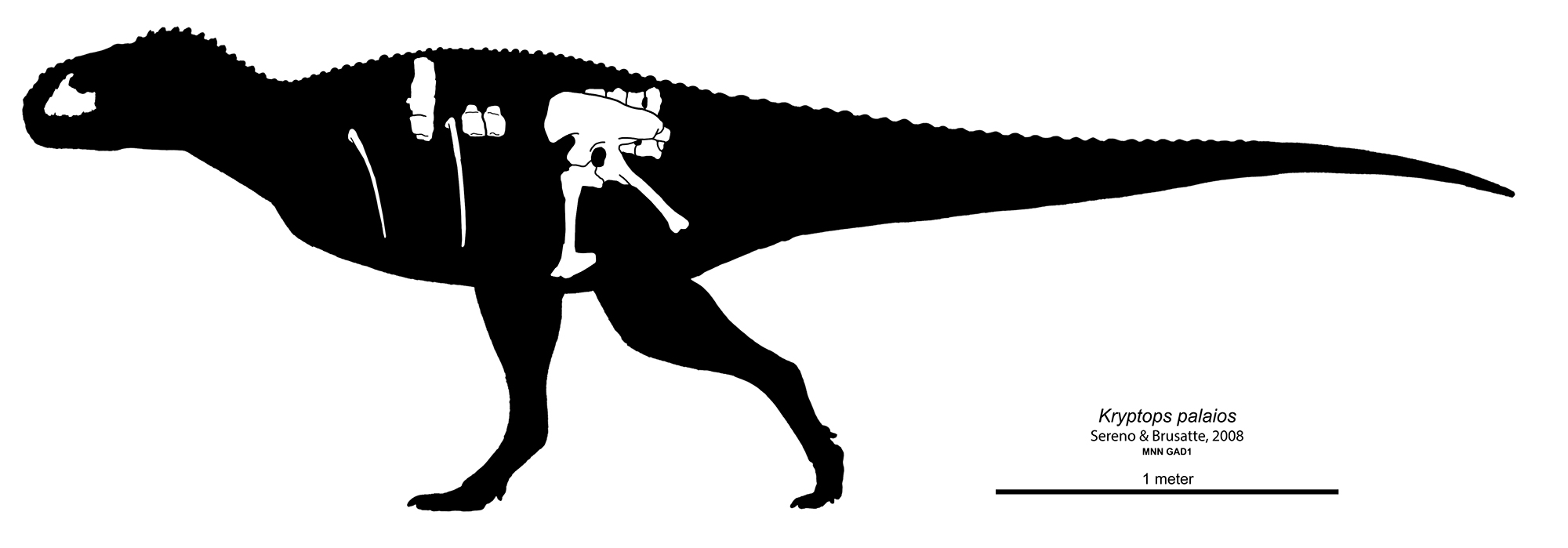
Skeletal diagram including all the material initially included in the Kryptops holotype

In 2000, an expedition conducted by the University of Chicago led by American paleontologist Paul Sereno and funded by the National Geographic Society explored fossiliferous sandstone outcrops in a site known as Gadoufaoua on the western edge of the Ténéré Desert of Niger. These layers belong to the Elrhaz Formation, which dates to the Aptian and Albian ages of the Early Cretaceous, around 112 million years ago. During the expedition, a maxilla (main tooth-bearing bone of the upper jaw) of a theropod was collected 15 m (49 ft) away from a set of postcranial elements consisting of three dorsal (back) vertebrae, two ribs, the sacrum, and the pelvis. These remains were then transported to the University of Chicago for study and preparation before being returned to the Musee National du Niger and deposited under the catalog number MNN GAD1. The maxilla was cataloged as MNN GAD1-1, whereas the postcranial fossils were assigned MNN GAD1-2 through MNN GAD1-8.

These theropod remains were believed to belong to the same individual by Paul Sereno, who, with Jeffrey Wilson and Jack Conrad, later mentioned them in a 2004 paper as an undescribed abelisaurid. Sereno and Steve Brusatte described the fossils as the holotype (name-bearing) specimen of a new genus and species of abelisaurid in 2008, named Kryptops palaios. The generic name derives from the Ancient Greek words krypto, meaning 'covered', and ops, meaning 'face', referencing the unique anatomy of the maxilla. The specific name, palaios, is a Greek term meaning "old", in reference to the age of the fossils compared to related taxa.

=== Identity of postcranial material ===
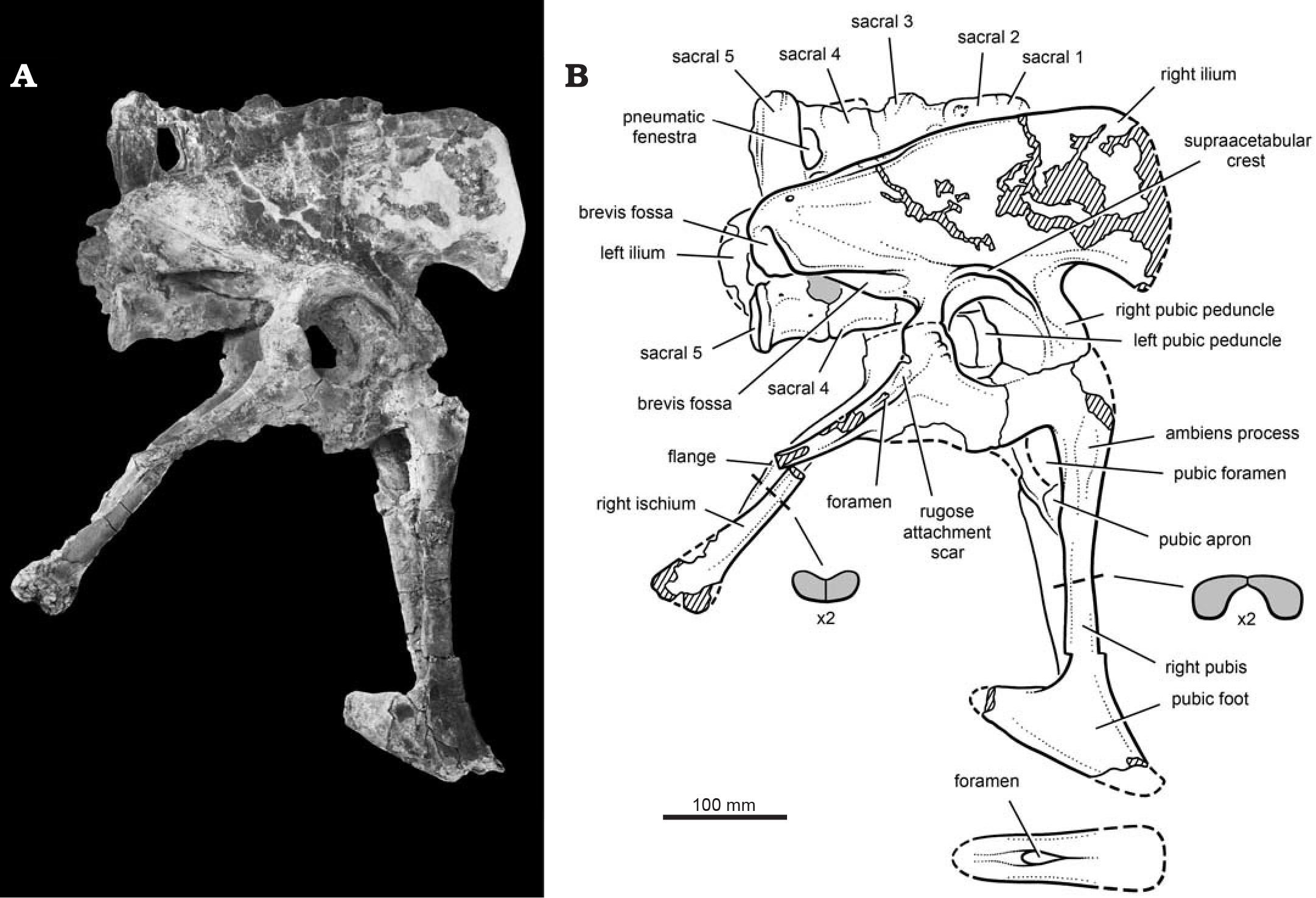
Pelvis and sacrum (MNN GAD1-2) initially part of the Kryptops holotype but now regarded as belonging to an allosauroid

Sereno and Brusatte assigned the postcranial material to the same individual as the maxilla based on their close association and alleged basal abelisaurid features in the vertebrae and pelvis. Kryptops is not the only theropod known from the Elrhaz Formation; other genera include Eocarcharia, Suchomimus, and Afromimus. In 2012, Matthew Carrano and colleagues considered Kryptops palaios to be a chimera (specimen composed of multiple species), and stated that its postcranial remains, especially the pelvis and sacrum, may actually belong to a carcharodontosaurid, possibly Eocarcharia. However, these bones do not overlap with the Eocarcharia holotype, which consists only of an isolated skull element. This hypothesis was supported by later studies, who agreed that the postcranial remains belonged to an allosauroid, or more specifically, a carcharodontosaurid. In 2018, paleontologist Rafael Delcourt questioned the validity of Kryptops, suggesting that, due to the presence of only one autapomorphy (unique feature) of the maxilla, Kryptops may be a nomen dubium.

In 2025, researchers Andrea Cau and Alessandro Paterna agreed with allosauroid affinities for the postcranium. However, their phylogenetic analysis placed this material in the family Metriacanthosauridae, rather than Carcharodontosauridae. Based on these results, they further suggested that metriacanthosaurids radiated across the world during the Early Cretaceous, as demonstrated by the roughly simultaneous presence of Erectopus in Europe, the "Kryptops" postcrania in Africa, and Siamotyrannus in Asia.

== Description ==
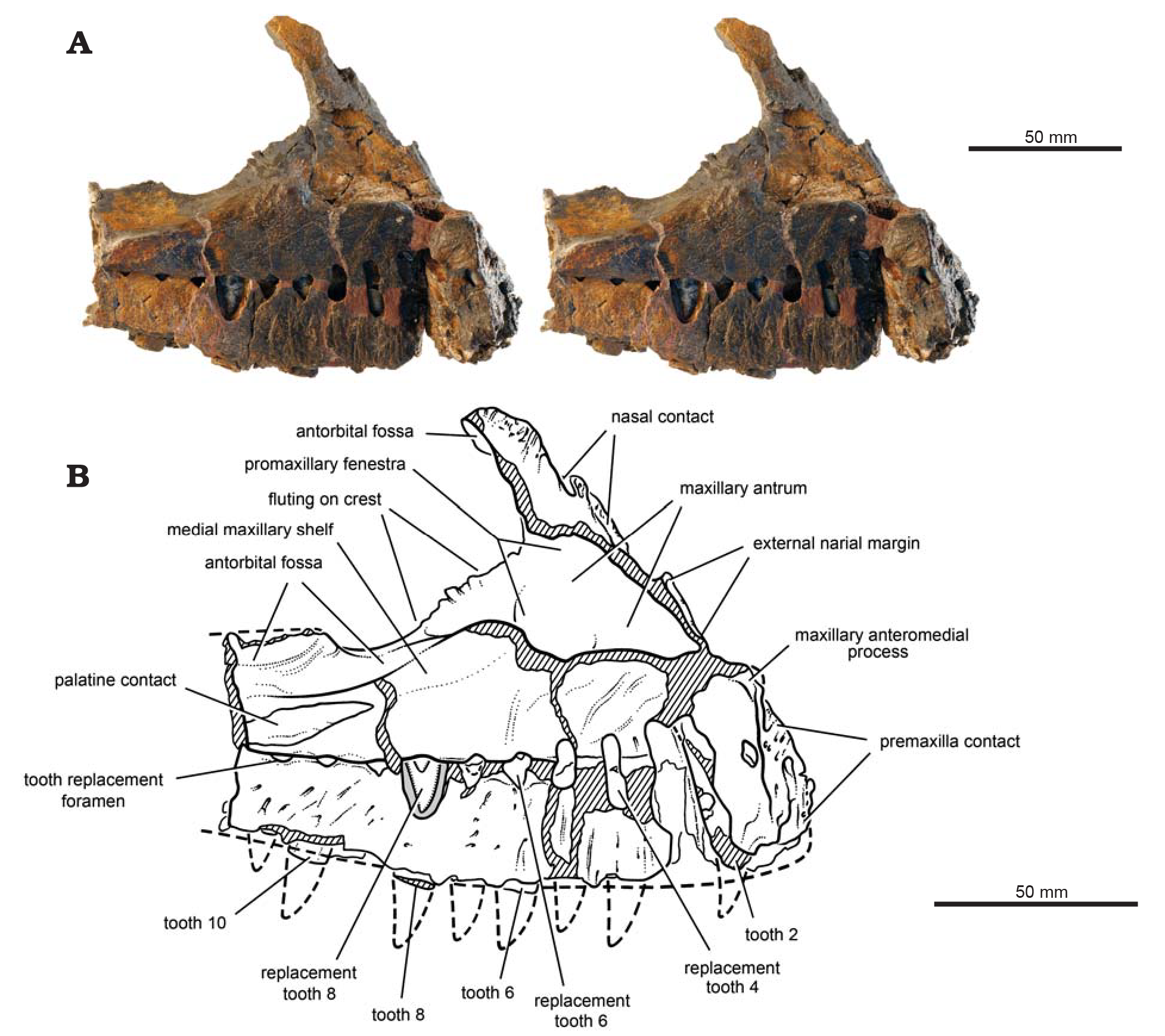
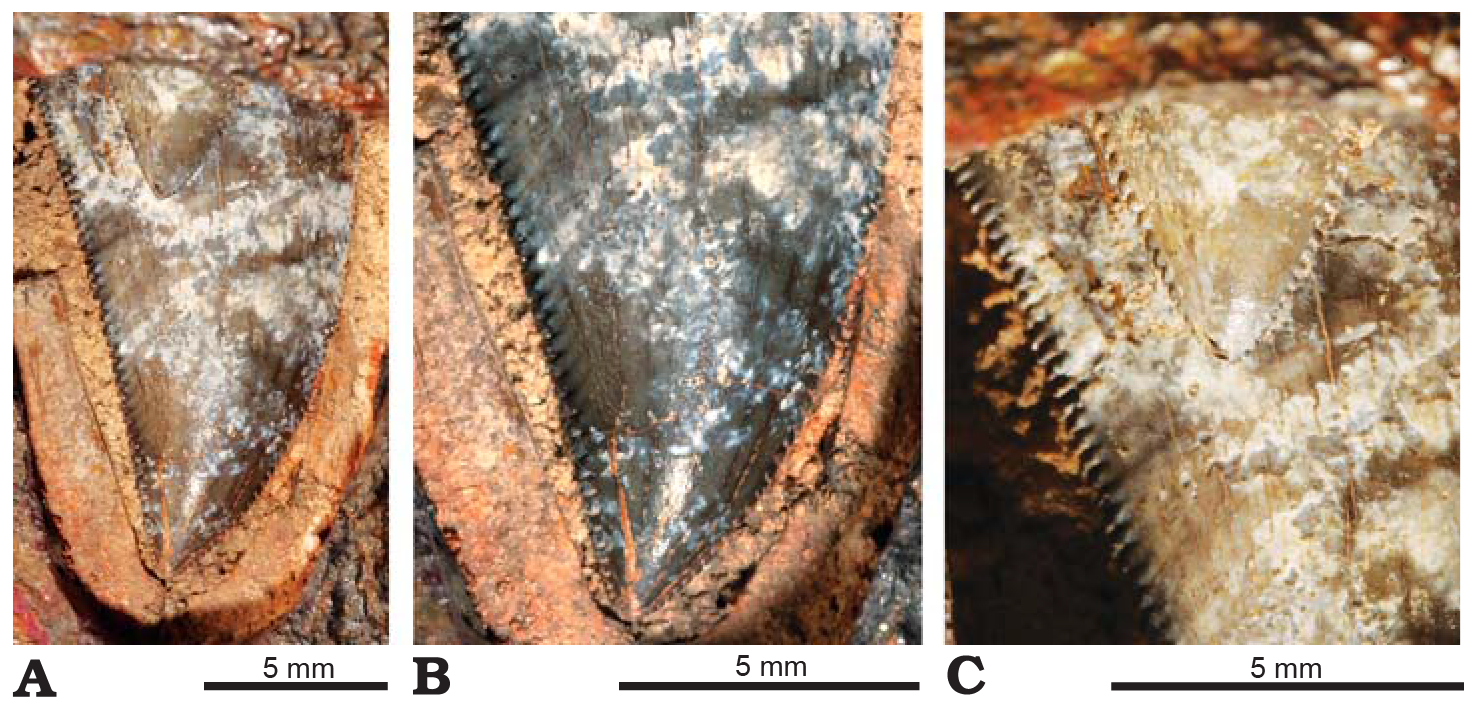
Holotype in media view (top) and a closeup of the replacement teeth (bottom)

The holotype individual is large for an abelisaurid, belonging to an adult about 6–7 m (19.7–23.0 ft) in length. Like other abelisaurids, Kryptops has a short, deep skull and a long, slender body. The maxilla has a preserved tooth row length of 15 cm (5.9 in) and is missing its tip, some of the alveolar margin (the upper edge of the maxilla that supports the tooth sockets), and the tooth crowns. The left maxilla preserves 11 alveoli (tooth positions) but likely bore 17 or 18 alveoli when complete, based on the related genus Rugops. There is a row of neurovascular foramina above the alveolar margin, a characteristic of abelisauroids.

The exterior face of the maxilla is extremely rugose, with pits and short vascular grooves adorning the surfaces. This condition is similar to that of other abelisaurids and some carcharodontosaurids. This may imply a keratinous integument on the maxillae instead of scales, giving the genus its name, though the skull of Carnotaurus was scaly. Sereno and Brusatte (2008) interpreted the external texture of the maxilla, with its short linear grooves, as a diagnostic characteristic of Kryptops, distinguishes it from other abelisaurids. However, Delcourt (2018) noted that this same condition is observable in Rugops and Majungasaurus, and therefore is not unique to Kryptops.

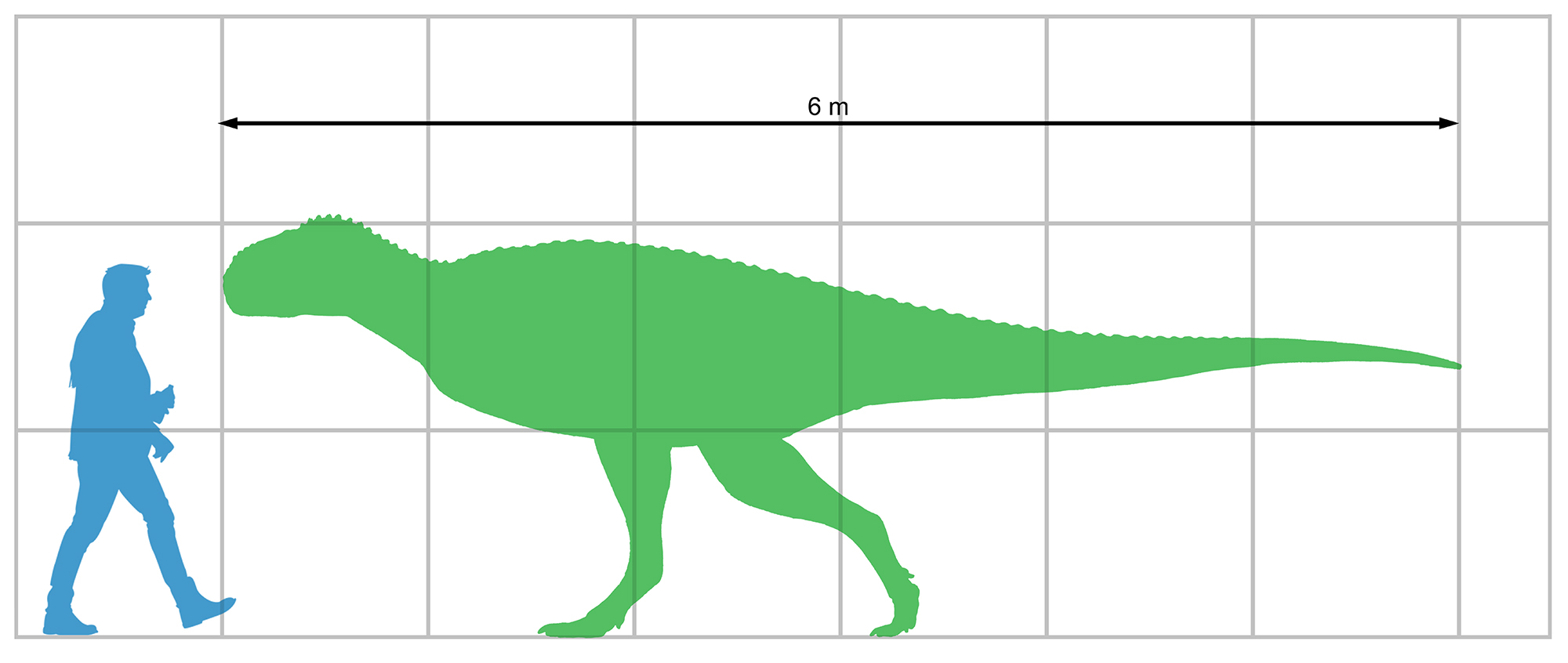
Size of Kryptops compared to a human

The holotype maxilla arches medially (inward) towards the articulation with the premaxilla, resulting in a broad, short skull as in its relatives. The front section of the maxilla is short and deep, even shorter than that of other abelisaurids. The proximal (towards the body core) portion of the posterior ramus has sub-parallel dorsal (top) and ventral (bottom) margins, but these are scalloped rather than smooth, a trait unique to the genus and species. Delcourt identified this is as the only valid autapomorphy of Kryptops. Dorsal and ventral edges of the promaxillary fenestra are hidden in lateral view by the lateral wall of the antorbital fossa, similar to Majungasaurus, Abelisaurus, and other abelisaurids.

The interdental plates are fused and textured with striations similar to the anatomy of interdental plates of other abelisaurids. The medial (facing inward) surface of the maxilla is broken, exposing the replacement teeth. There are several complete teeth preserved within the maxilla and exposed along the tooth row. Their crowns are relatively flat and wide, as in other abelisaurids, and have about 15 serrations for every 5 mm (0.20 in). This is comparable to the serration counts of indeterminate abelisaurids from Morocco and Egypt but greater than that of Rugops.

== Classification ==
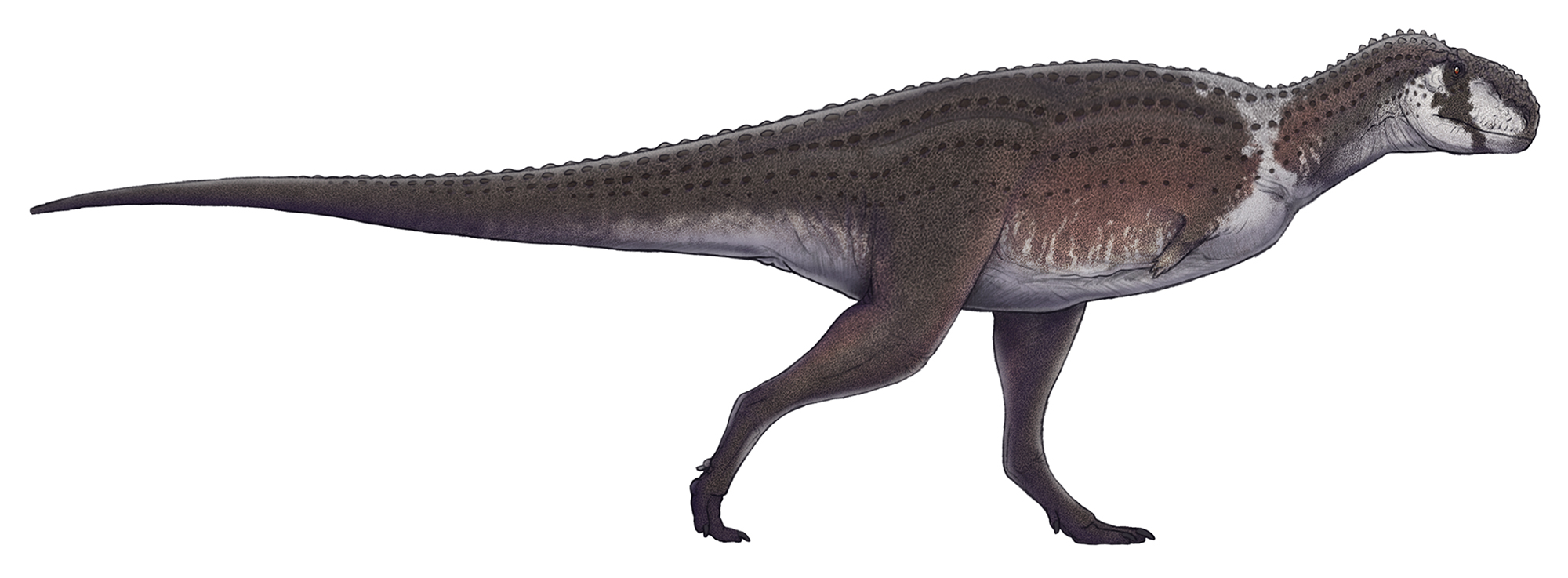
Speculative life restoration of Kryptops

Abelisauridae is a group of theropod dinosaurs that existed during the Cretaceous (and potentially earlier in the Jurassic) up until the Cretaceous-Paleogene extinction event. Abelisaurids have been recovered as the sister family to the noasaurids within the superfamily Abelisauroidea. Kryptops and Rugops are some of the oldest-known abelisaurids, making them critical to understanding the evolution and diversification of Abelisauridae. Sereno and Brusatte noted that Kryptops’ maxilla bore a mix of characteristics seen in other basal abelisaurids as well as derived members from the Late Cretaceous.

The phylogenetic position of Kryptops has been unstable, as the genus is only definitively known from a maxilla, though it is generally regarded as a basal abelisaurid. In their 2008 phylogenetic analysis, Sereno and Brusatte recovered Kryptops as the earliest diverging abelisaurid, followed by Rugops and Rajasaurus, more basal than Majungasaurus and Carnotaurus. This phylogenetic analysis assumed that the postcranial remains belonged to Kryptops. Similar results were recovered by Filippi and colleagues in their 2016 description of Viavenator, even with Kryptops scored only for the maxilla. Some later phylogenetic analyses excluded Kryptops due to the lack of material and its instability in phylogenetic analyses.

Multiple phylogenetic analyses from 2024 and 2025 recovered Kryptops as a more derived taxon, more closely related to the brachyrostrans and majungasaurines than in previous work, and diverging after Rugops. The results of one such analysis, from the 2024 description of the abelisaurid Koleken by Pol et al., are displayed in the cladogram below. Kryptops was recovered as the sister taxon to the clade formed by Majungasaurinae and Brachyrostra.

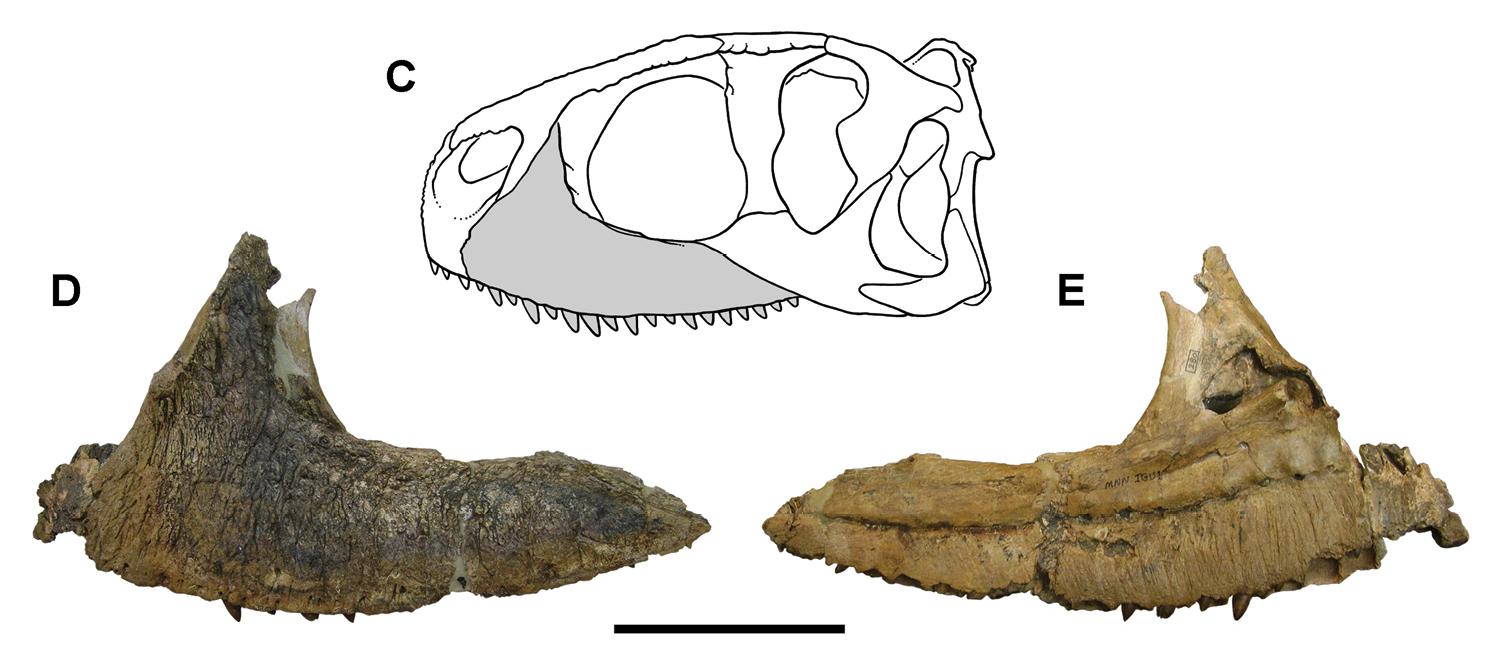
Reconstructed skull of Rugops, another early abelisaurid, with the maxilla indicated

- Abelisauridae
  - Eoabelisaurus
  - - - Huinculsaurus
      - - Genusaurus
        - Spectrovenator
    - - - MPM 99
        - - Rugops
          - - Dahalokely
            - Xenotarsosaurus
      - - Kryptops
        - - "Majungasaurinae"
          - Brachyrostra
            - - - Ekrixinatosaurus
                - Thanos
              - - Ilokelesia
                - Kurupi
            - - Skorpiovenator
              - Furileusauria

== Paleoenvironment ==
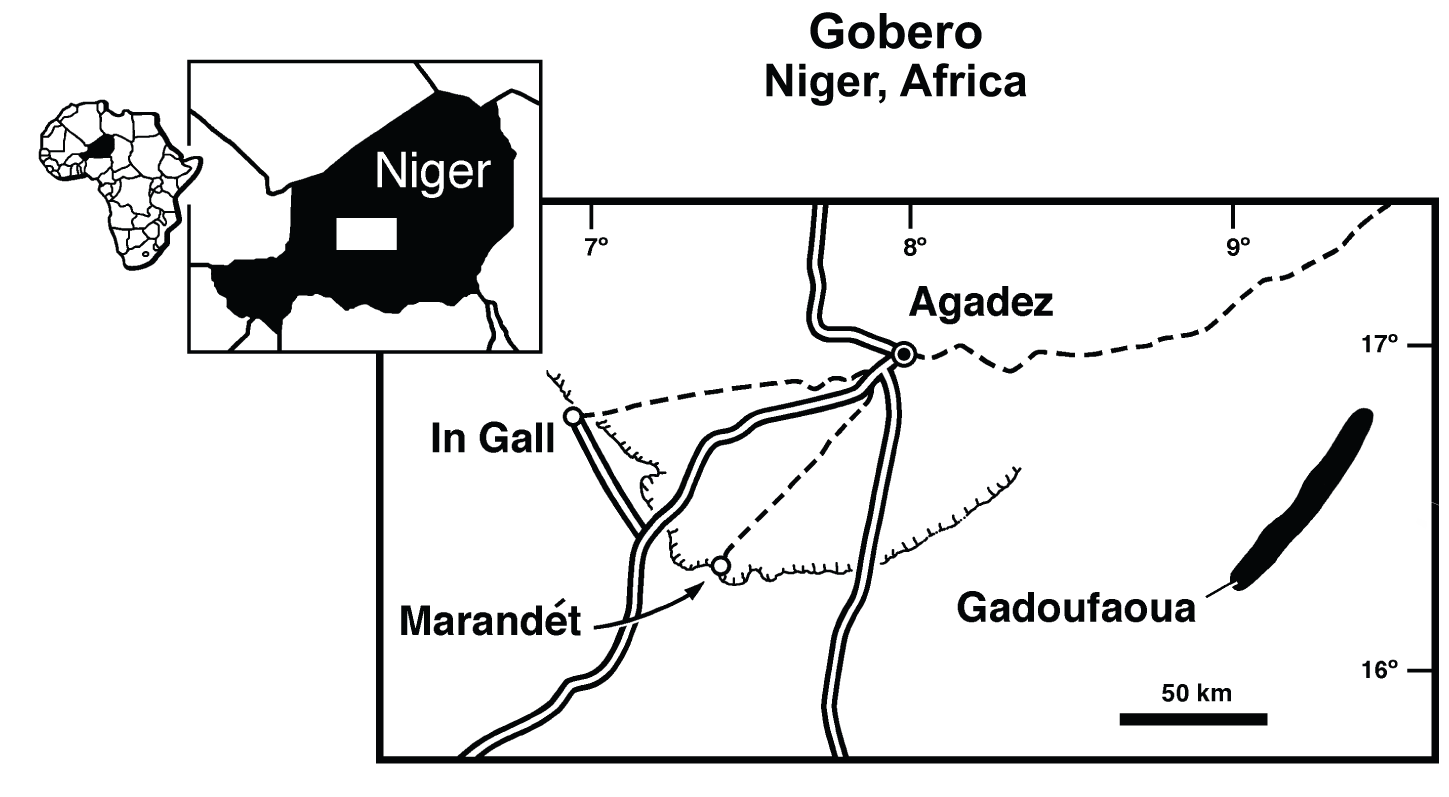
Location of Gadoufaoua in Niger

Kryptops is known from the Elrhaz Formation of the Tegama Group in an area of the Nigerian Ténéré Desert called Gadoufaoua. Only one specimen of Kryptops is known. The Elrhaz Formation consists mainly of fluvial sandstones with low relief, much of which is obscured by sand dunes. The sediments are coarse- to medium-grained, with almost no fine-grained horizons. Kryptops lived about 120 to 112 million years ago, during the Aptian to Albian ages of the mid-Cretaceous. It likely lived in habitats dominated by inland floodplains (a riparian zone).

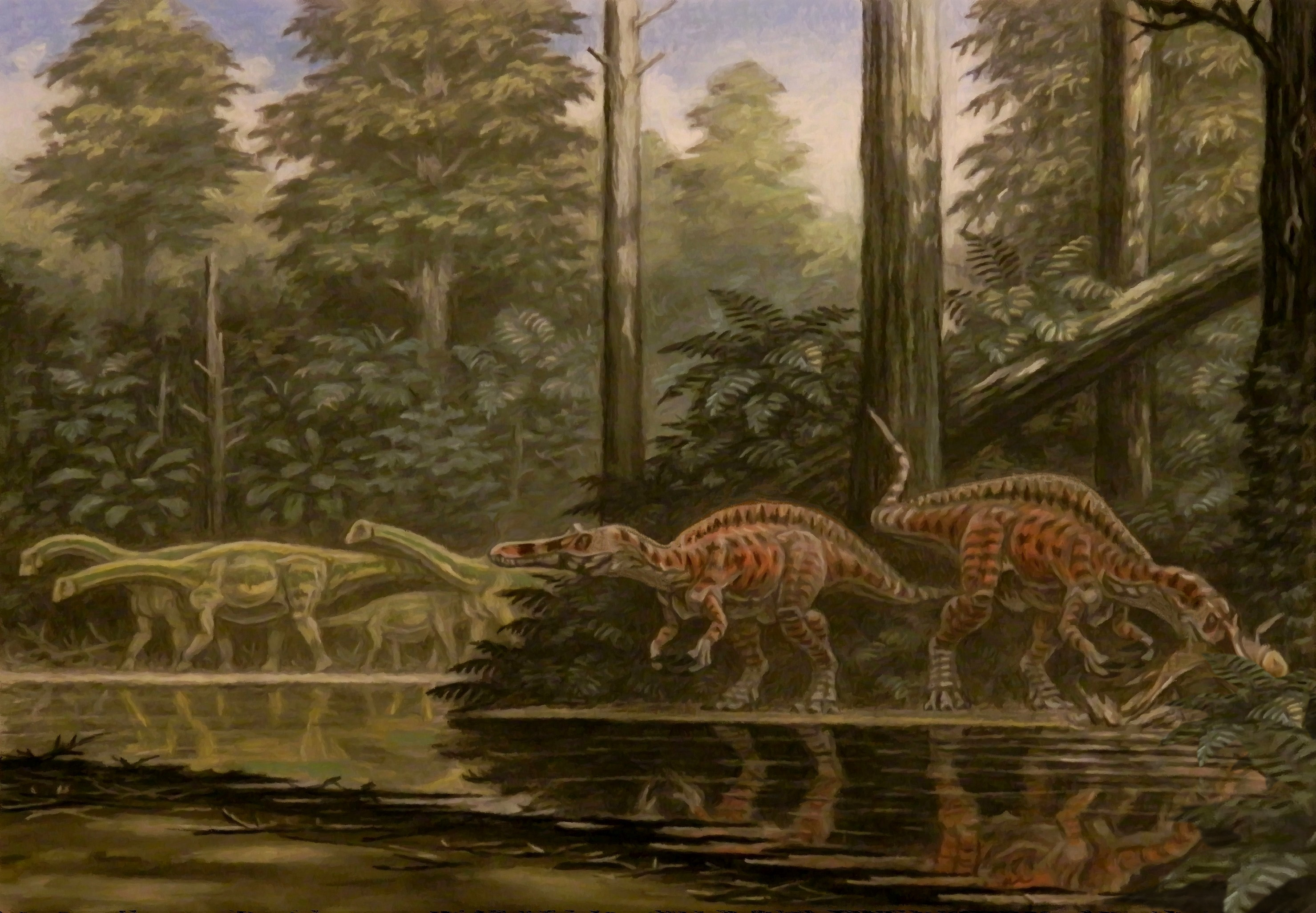
Restoration of Suchomimus (foreground) and Nigersaurus (background) in the Elrhaz Formation environment

Kryptops lived alongside several other dinosaurs. These included other theropods, such as Eocarcharia (known from a chimeric combination of carcharodontosaurid and propobable spinosaurid material), the spinosaurid Suchomimus, and the putative noasaurid Afromimus. Several megaherbivores like the hadrosauriforms Ouranosaurus and Lurdusaurus, dryosaurid Elrhazosaurus, and two sauropods, the rebbachisaurid Nigersaurus and an unnamed titanosaur, have been unearthed from Gadoufaoua. Together, these compose one of the few associations of megaherbivores with a balance of sauropods and large ornithopods. Crocodylomorphs like Sarcosuchus, Anatosuchus, Araripesuchus, and Stolokrosuchus also lived there. In addition, remains of an ornithocheirid pterosaur, turtles, bony fish, a hybodont shark, and bivalves have been found. The aquatic fauna consists entirely of freshwater inhabitants.
