= Elrhaz Formation =

Geological formation in Niger, West Africa

- Stratigraphic range: Early Cretaceous (Barremian to Albian), 125–112 Ma
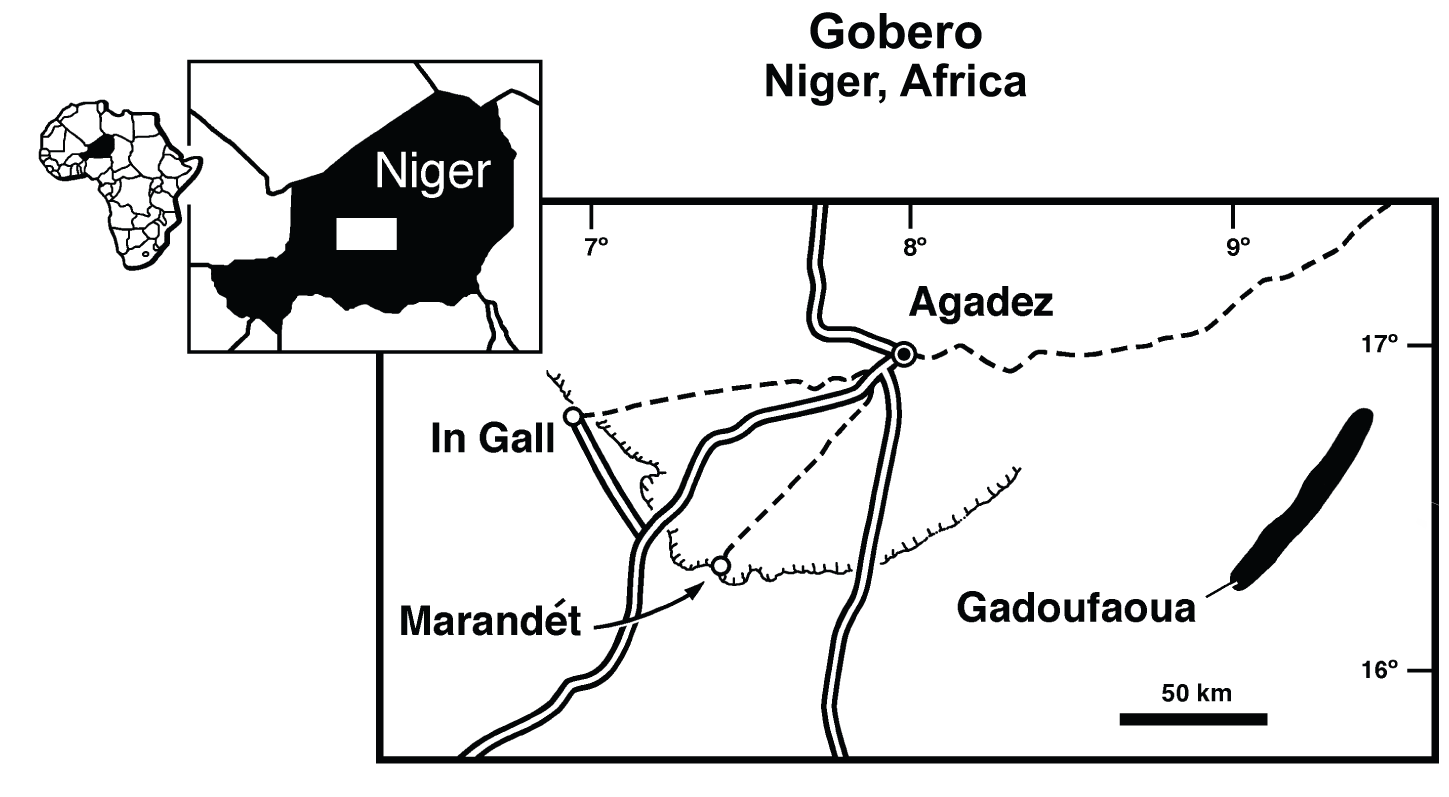
- Outcrops of the formation near Gadoufaoua
- Type: Geological formation
- Unit of: Tegama Group
- Underlies: Echkar Formation
- Overlies: Tazolé Formation

Lithology
- Primary: Sandstone

Location
- Coordinates: 16.8°N 9.5°E
- Approximate paleocoordinates: 3.1°N 4.9°E
- Region: Africa
- Country: Niger
- Extent: Tenere desert
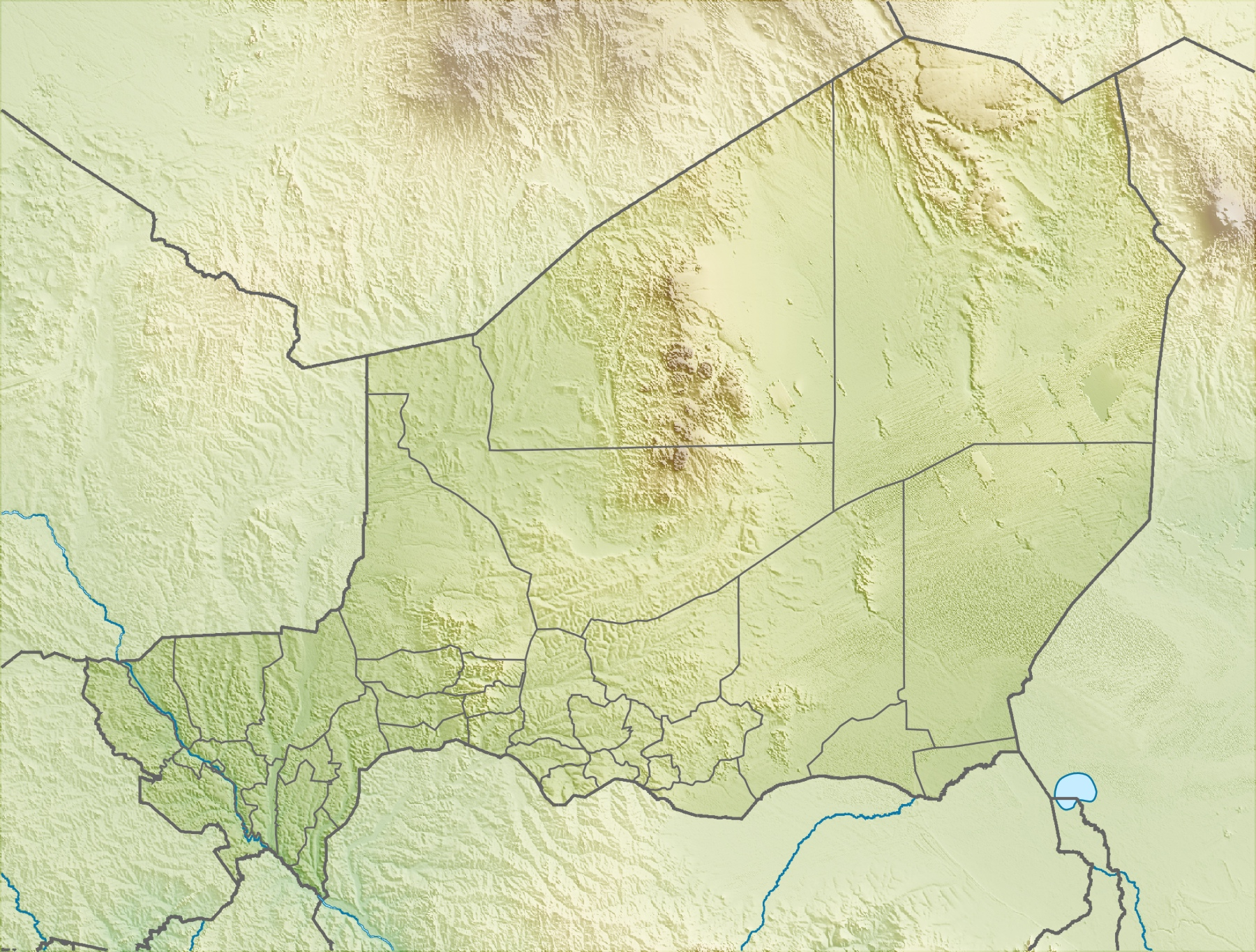
- Elrhaz Formation (Niger)

The Elrhaz Formation is a geological formation in Niger, West Africa.

Its strata date back to the Early Cretaceous, about 125 to 112 million years ago. Dinosaur remains are among the fossils that have been recovered from the formation, alongside those of multiple species of crocodyliformes.

== Gadoufaoua ==
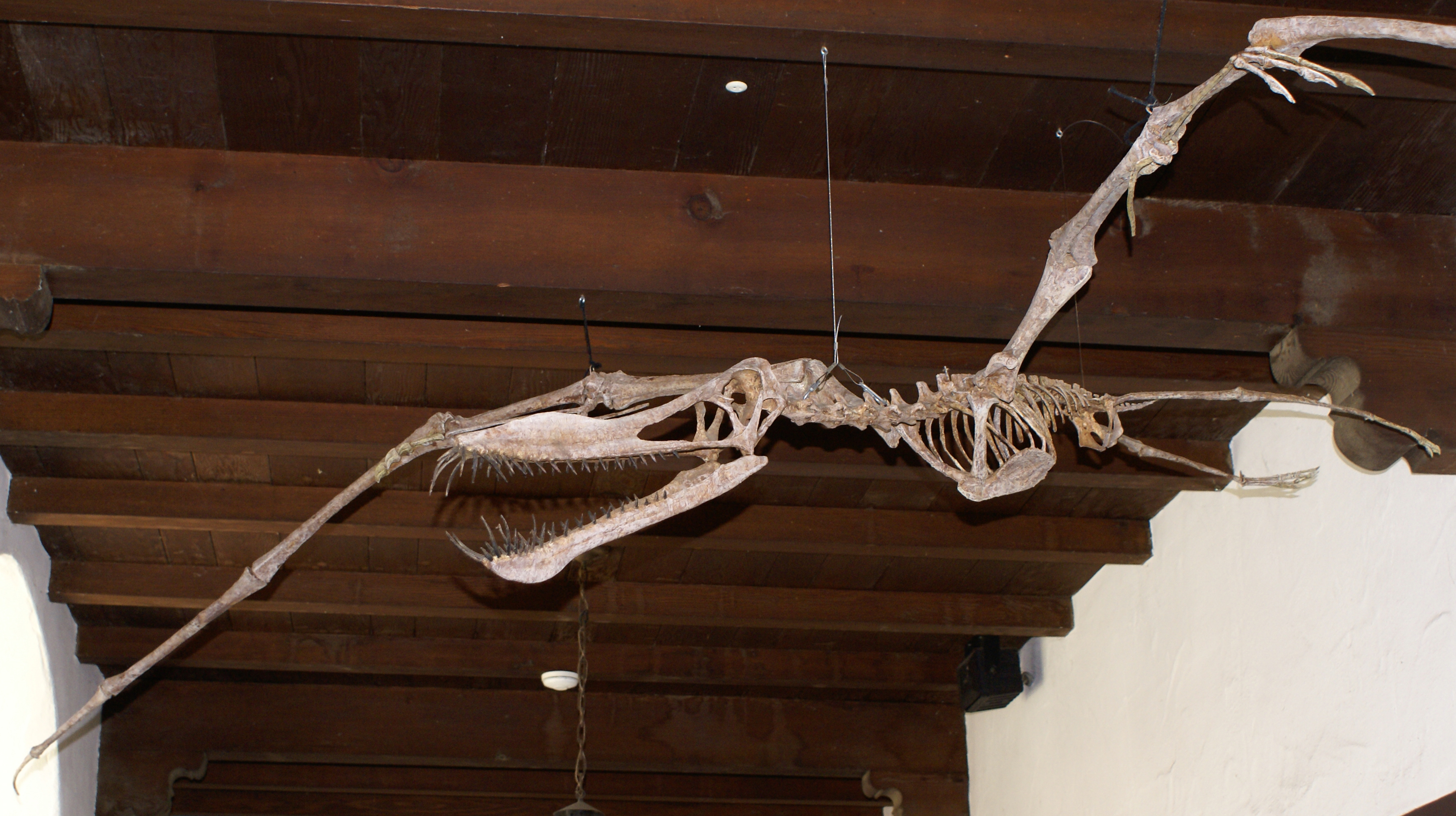
Reconstructed skeleton of an anhanguerid from the formation

Gadoufaoua (Tuareg for "the place where camels fear to go") is a site within the Elrhaz Formation (located at 16°50′N 9°25′E) in the Tenere desert of Niger known for its extensive fossil graveyard. It is where remains of Sarcosuchus imperator, popularly known as SuperCroc, were found (by Paul Sereno in 1997, for example), including vertebrae, limb bones, armor plates, jaws, and a nearly complete 6 feet (1.8 m) skull.

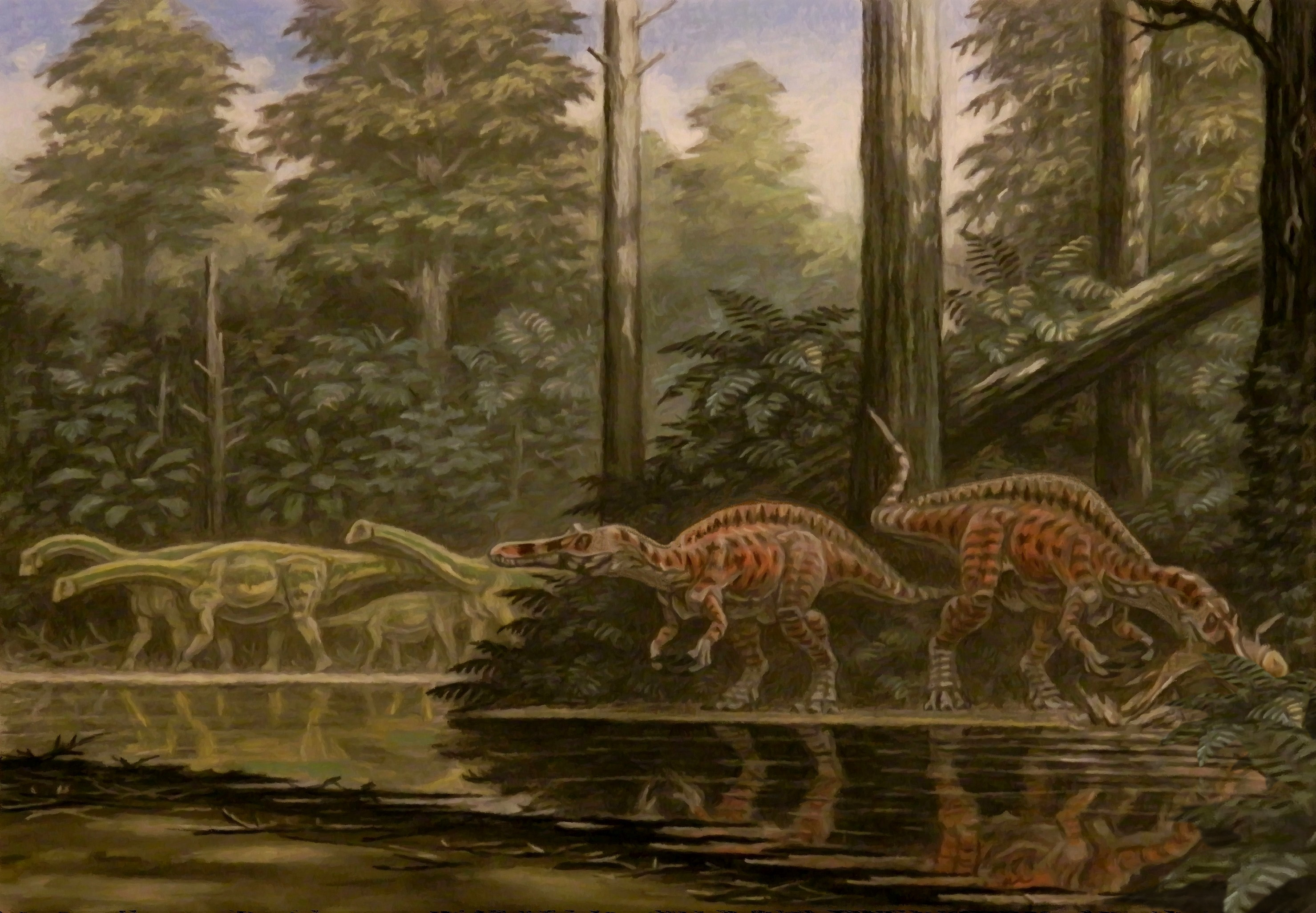
Dinosaurs of Elrhaz formation

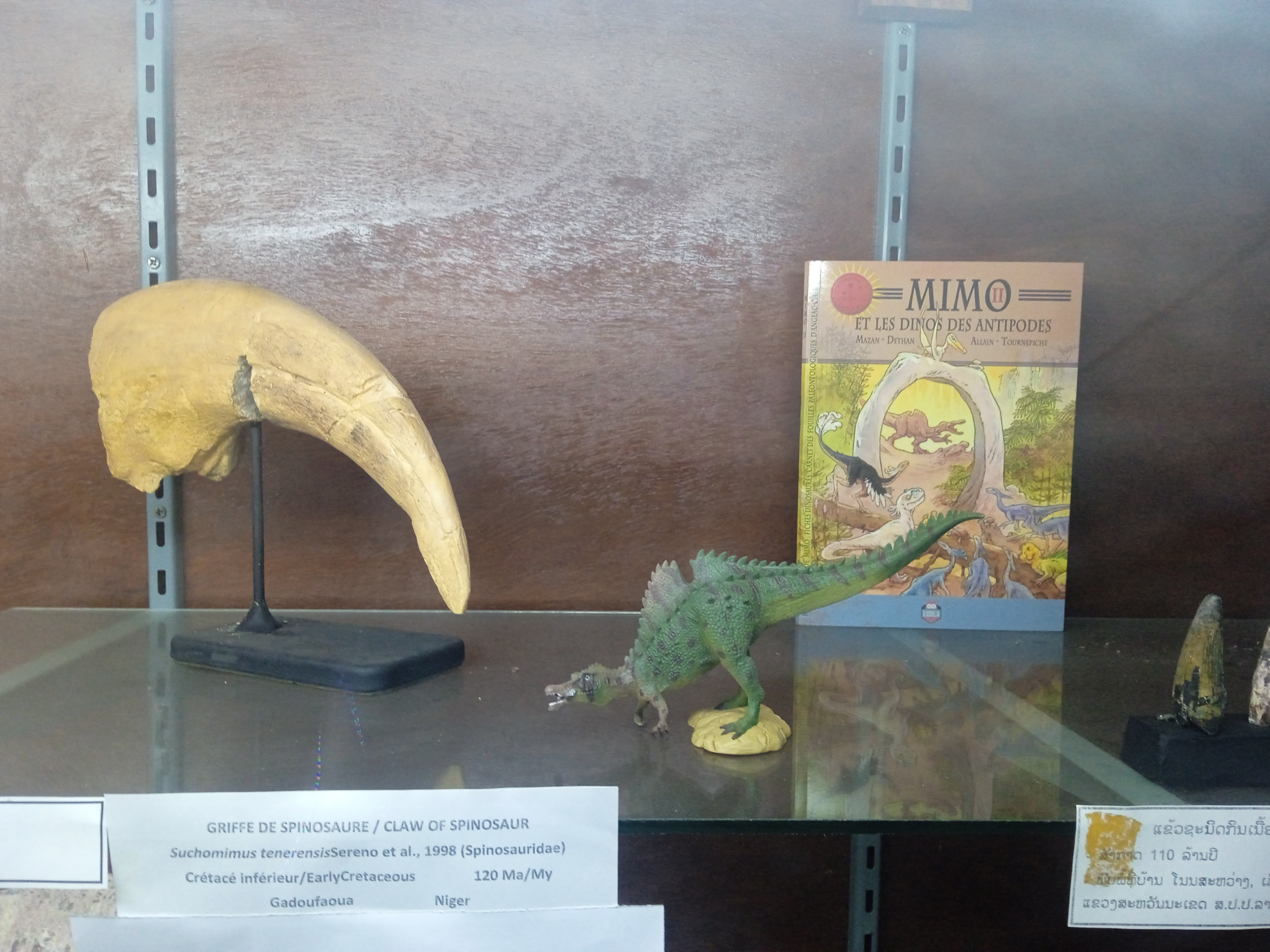
A spinosaurid claw from the Elrhaz formation

Today, Gadoufaoua is very hot and dry. However, 112 million years ago (based on the sedimentary and fossil record), Gadoufaoua had trees, plants, and wide rivers. The river covered the remains of dead animals, the fossilized remains of which were protected by the drying rivers over millions of years.

== Vertebrate paleofauna ==
=== Chondrichthyes ===
Chondrichthyes
Genus	Species	Material	Notes	Images
Hybodus	H. sp.	Dorsal spines		

=== Sarcopterygii ===
Sarcopterygii
Genus	Species	Material	Notes	Images
Asiatoceratodus	A. tiguidiensis		Dipnomorph fish. Originally described as Ceratodus tiguidiensis, assigned to Arganodus by M. Martin (1984) and reassigned by Kemp (1998) to the genus Asiatoceratodus.	
Mawsonia	M. tegamensis		A small species.	
Neoceratodus	N. africanus	Tooth plates.	Dipnomorph fish. Originally described as Ceratodus africanus, assigned to Neoceratodus by M. Martin, 1982.	Neoceratodus forsteri, a modern species

=== Actinopterygii ===
Actinopterygii
Genus	Species	Material	Notes	Images
Pliodetes	P. nigeriensis	Skull and postcranial material including body scales.	Originally thought to be a semionotid, later assigned to Lepisosteoidei.	
Pycnodontidae indet.	Indeterminate			

=== Testudines ===
Testudines
Genus	Species	Material	Notes	Images
Francemys	F. gadoufaouaensis	"Shell of a juvenile individual and several articulated and disarticulated plates."	Pelomedusoid turtle. Named in honour of France de Lapparent de Broin.	
Taquetochelys	T. decorata	A few disarticulated plates and nearly complete skeleton.	Araripemydid turtle, similar in shell size to South American Araripemys (20–30 cm). Laganemys tenerensis was synonymysed with Taquetochelys by Pérez-García, 2018.	
Teneremys	T. lapparenti	"Several relatively complete skeletons."		

=== Crocodyliformes ===
Crocodyliformes
Genus	Species	Material	Notes	Images
Anatosuchus	A. minor	"Nearly complete skull"		
Araripesuchus	A. wegeneri	"Nearly complete skull"		
Sarcosuchus	S. imperator	"Partial skeletons, numerous skulls"		
Stolokrosuchus	S. lapparenti			

=== Pterosaurs ===
Crocodyliformes
Genus	Species	Material	Notes	Images
Anhangueridae indet.	Indeterminate	Partial wing		
Ornithocheiridae indet.	Indeterminate	Tooth		
Tapejaroidea indet.	Indeterminate	Humerus		

=== Dinosaurs ===
==== Ornithischians ====
Ornithischians
Genus	Species	Material	Notes	Images
Elrhazosaurus	E. nigeriensis	"Femora."	A dryosaurid	
Lurdusaurus	L. arenatus	"Partial skull, fragmentary postcranial skeleton."		
Ouranosaurus	O. nigeriensis	"Skull and poscrania, second skeleton."		

==== Theropods ====
Theropods
Genus	Species	Material	Notes	Images
Afromimus	A. tenerensis	"caudal vertebrae, chevrons and portions of the right hind limb"	A putative noasaurid	
Cristatusaurus	C. lapparenti	Jaw bones and vertebral fragments.	A dubious spinosaurid potentially synonymous with Suchomimus	
Eocarcharia	E. dinops	"Partial skull and postcranial remains."	Known from chimaeric remains; the holotype and skull roof material likely derive from a baryonychine spinosaurid, while the referred maxilla is from a carcharodontosaurid.	
Kryptops	K. palaios	Postcranial skeleton and partial skull.	An abelisaurid	
Suchomimus	S. tenerensis	Partial skull and associated skeleton.	A baryonychine spinosaurid	

==== Sauropods ====
Sauropods
Genus	Species	Material	Notes	Images
Nigersaurus	N. taqueti	Skull and skeletal remains	A rebbachisaurid.	

=== Flora ===
Plants
Genus	Species	Material	Notes	Images
Paradoxopteris	P. stromeri		A tree fern and member of Matoniaceae.	
Protophyllocladoxylon	P.chudeaui		A conifer	

== See also ==
- List of dinosaur-bearing rock formations
- Crato Formation
- Romualdo Formation
