= Philippe Taquet =

French paleontologist (1940–2025)

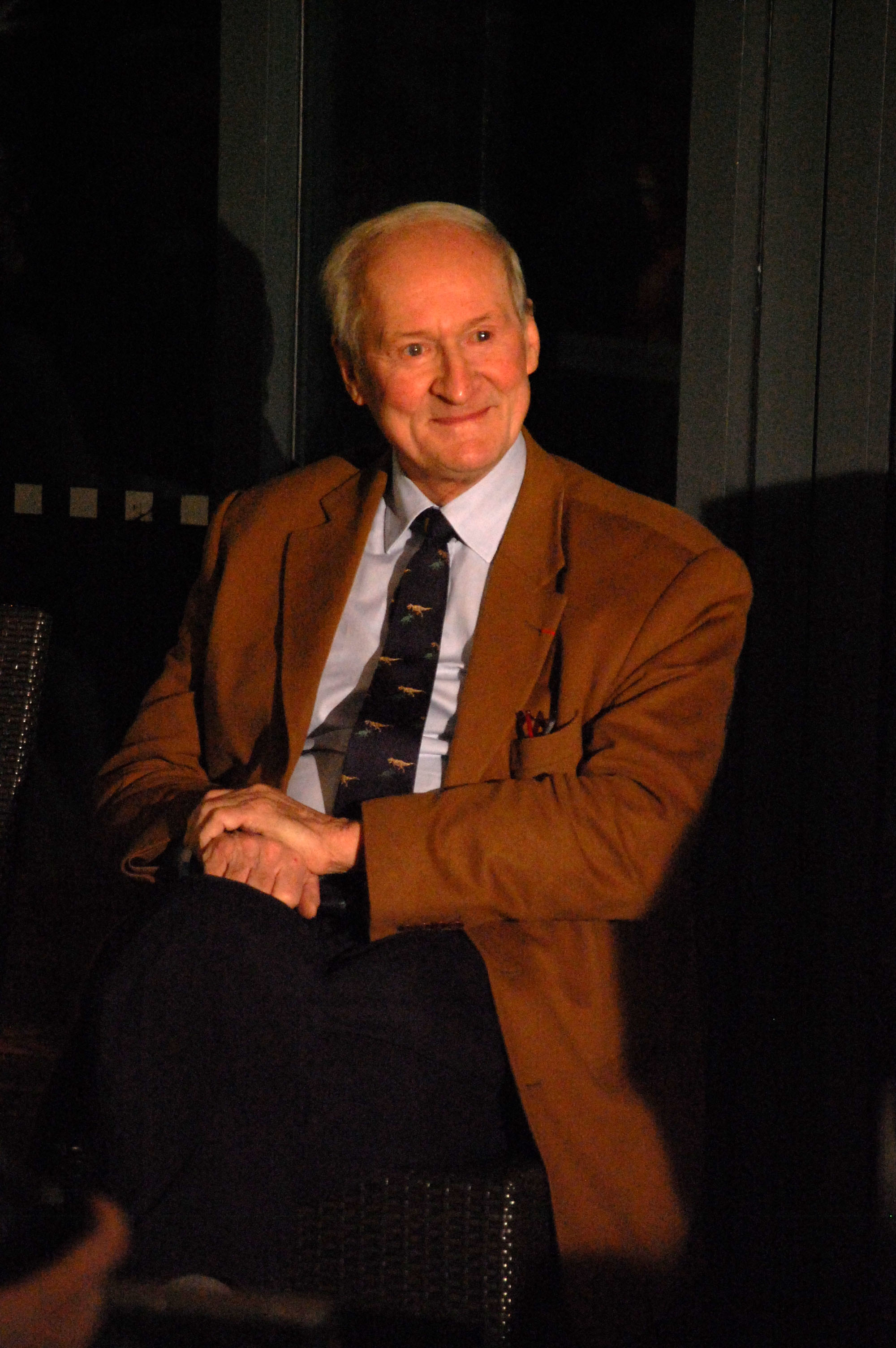
Taquet in 2013

Philippe Taquet (25 April 1940 – 16 November 2025) was a French paleontologist who specialised in dinosaur systematics of finds primarily in northern Africa.

== Life and career ==
Taquet was a member of the French Academy of Sciences beginning on 30 November 2004, and president from 2012. He studied and described a number of new dinosaur species from Africa, especially from the Aptian site of Gadoufaoua in Niger (such as Ouranosaurus). He also researched the Lower Cretaceous stratigraphic relationship between western Africa and Brazil by reconstructing the paleobiology from fossil floras and faunas. He was president of the French National Museum of Natural History from 1985 to 1990.

He received the Sue Tyler Friedman Medal in 2009 for work in the history of geology.

Taquet died on 16 November 2025, at the age of 85.
