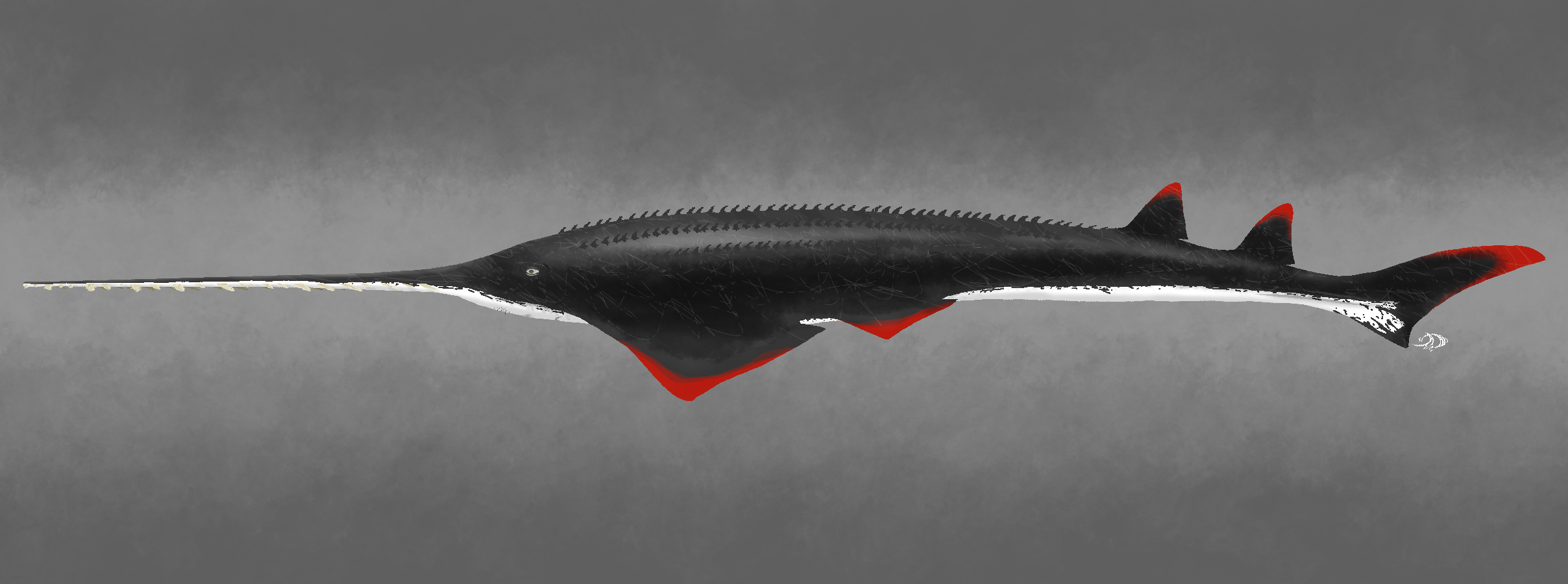
- Hypothetical life reconstruction based on relatives

Scientific classification
- Kingdom: Animalia
- Phylum: Chordata
- Class: Chondrichthyes
- Subclass: Elasmobranchii
- Order: Rajiformes
- Suborder: †Sclerorhynchoidei
- Genus: †Atlanticopristis; Pereira & Medeiros, 2008
- Species: †A. equatorialis

Binomial name
- †Atlanticopristis equatorialis Pereira & Medeiros, 2008

= Atlanticopristis =

Atlanticopristis Temporal range: Late Cretaceous, (Cenomanian) 100.5–93.9 Ma

Extinct genus of cartilaginous fishes

Atlanticopristis (meaning "Atlantic saw") is an extinct genus of sclerorhynchoid that lived during the Late Cretaceous (Cenomanian) of what is now the Northeast Region of Brazil, between 100.5 and 93.9 million years ago. It contains a single species, Atlanticopristis equatorialis, originally assigned to the closely related genus Onchopristis.

Similar to modern sawfish, it would have had a long snout armed with modified fish scales shaped into "teeth", but the rostral denticles of Atlanticopristis had barbs on both sides. Atlanticopristis inhabited fresh to brackish water estuaries near large conifer forests, and lived in the same time and place as many species of bony fish, cartilaginous fish, and lobe finned fish, as well as some crocodilians, and several dinosaurs. Many of the taxa present in the Alcântara Formation are also known from the same-aged Kem Kem Beds in Morocco, due to the past connection of South America and Africa into the supercontinent Gondwana.

== Discovery and naming ==
In 2007, fourteen rostral denticles which were discovered in the Maranhão state of northeastern Brazil, at the Alcântara Formation of the Itapecuru Group on Cajual Island, were referred to as Onchopristis sp. based on the shape of the peduncle, the presence of multiple barbs, and the enamel ribbing.

In 2008, the Portuguese paleontologists Manuel Medeiros and Agostinha Pereira assigned the fourteen rostral denticles to their own genus and species, Atlanticopristis equatorialis, based on the lack of an intermediate form between Atlanticopristis and Onchopristis, as well as morphological differences that distinguish it from other sclerorhynchoids. The generic name referring to the Atlantic Ocean, in which most sediments of the Alcântara Formation were deposited, and "pristis" being the Greek word for "saw". The specific name "equatorialis" was chosen due to the discovery site being in close proximity to the equator.

The fossils were brought back from the Falésia do Sismito exposure, but because the bones of sclerorhynchoids are made of cartilage, their skeletons do not fossilize easily, so most remains found consist of the teeth from their snouts. The specimens of Atlanticopristis are currently housed at the Centro de Pesquisa de História Natural e Arqueologia do Maranhão (Archaeology and Natural History Research Center of Maranhão), in São Luís. The holotype tooth (CPHNAMA-VT 1174) was designated as such for being the most complete and well preserved specimen. Additionally, several specimens were assigned as paratypes: CPHNAMA-VT 1086, a single tooth and the largest specimen; CPHNAMA-VT 1085, two complete teeth; CPHNAMA-VT 1088 and CPHNAMA-VT 1173, two groups of four incomplete teeth each, all missing the tip of the crown; and CPHNAMA-VT 1173, two partial specimens with most of the crown.

== Description ==
Denticle comparison with three other sclerorhynchoid species, as well as the sawfish, Pristis pristis (Atlanticopristis in blue)

The teeth on the rostrum (snout) of Atlanticopristis have a varied number of barbs at the front and rear margins. They are also laterally compressed, with both sides displaying thin enamel ridges extending outward from the base of the tooth, forming a fan shape. Some of the teeth also have grooves running down their length on both sides. The peduncle (or base) of the tooth is enlarged, and covered in irregular ridges, the bottom is typically concave, having a sub-rectangular or ellipsoid shape.

The specimens range in size from 11.5 mm (0.45 inches) to 18.8 mm (0.74 inches). The holotype (CPHNAMA-VT 1174) is 15 mm (0.59 inches) in length, including the peduncle; which itself is 6.3 mm (0.24 inches) wide, and 3 mm (0.11 inches) long. It has a thickness of 3 mm (0.11 inches). The barb number on all specimens ranges from two to four barbs at the front margin and four to five at the rear, some specimens like CPHNAMA-VT 1085 having vestigial bumps that could be considered additional barbs.

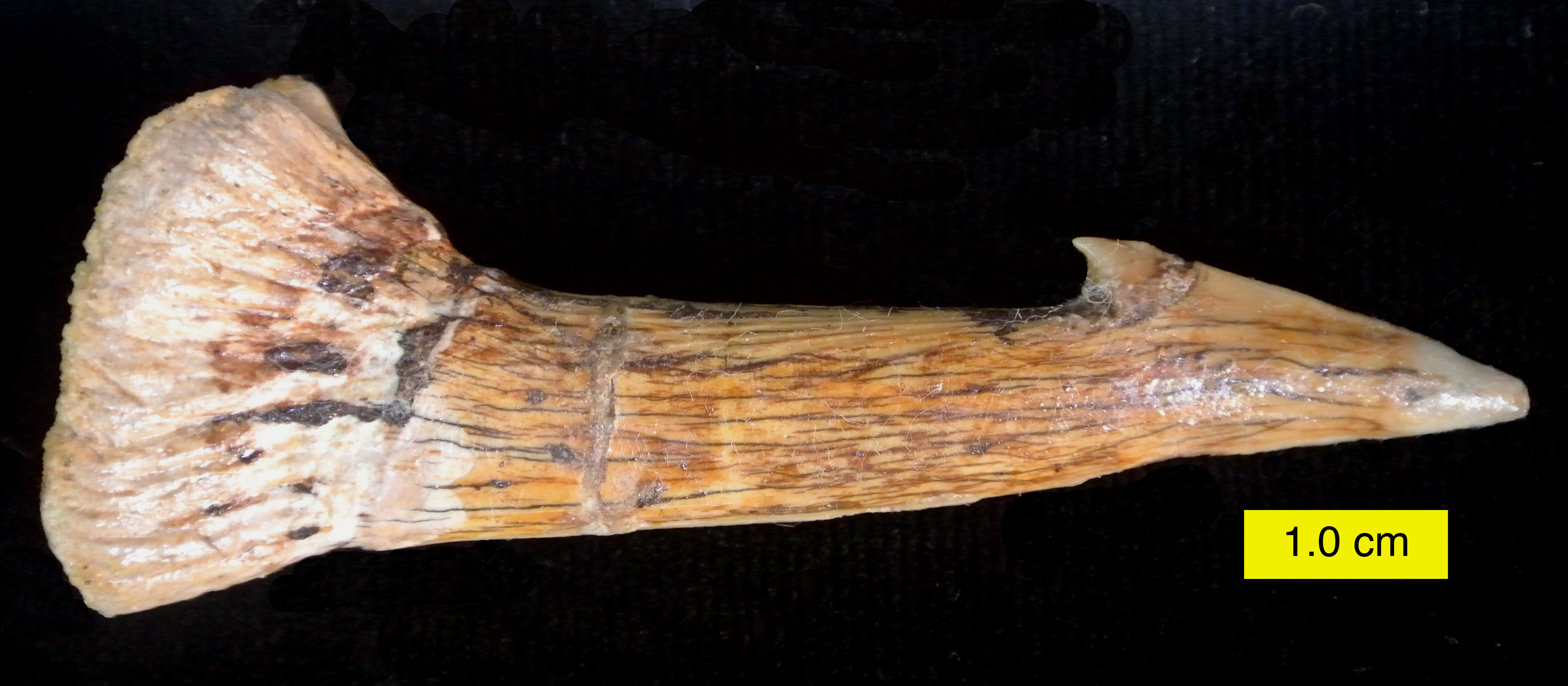
Onchopristis numida tooth, displaying the same enamel ribbing found in Atlanticopristis

Sawfish and sawsharks evolved long snouts armed with rows of teeth on both sides, although these spines do not represent true teeth, but highly modified fish scales, or dermal denticles. This adaptation could be related to their feeding habits, such as sifting through sand/mud to search for food or to slash at prey. Likewise, these spines were attached to the rostrum of sclerorhynchoids like Atlanticopristis using ligaments, compared to modern sawfish which have their teeth attached via alveoli (tooth sockets). The longitudinal ribbing, or ridges, of enameloid that can be seen on sclerorhynchoid teeth would have aided in the attachment of these ligaments.

== Classification ==
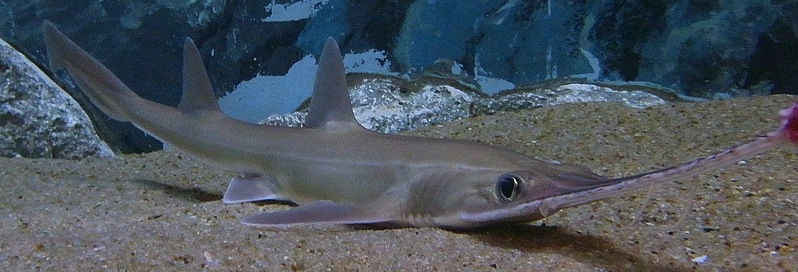
Pristiophorids, like this Japanese sawshark, are similar in dentition to Mesozoic sclerorhynchoids, but are not close relatives.

Atlanticopristis belongs to the Sclerorhynchoidei, an extinct suborder of rajiform rays during the Cretaceous period that had long rostra with large denticles similar to sawfishes and sawsharks. This feature was convergently evolved, recently proposed as 'pristification', and their closest living relatives are actually skates. While Pereira and Medeiros (2008) assigned Atlanticopristis to the family Sclerorhynchidae and considered it to be very closely related to Onchopristis, recent phylogenetic analyses suggest that Onchopristis belongs to its own monotypic family Onchopristidae, and that Atlanticopristis does not belong to the sclerorhynchids.

The barb number on the spines of Atlanticopristis more closely resembles that of Onchopristis dunklei than Onchopristis numida, as O. numida usually has no more than a single barb, while O. dunklei always has more than one. The sclerorhynchoid Borodinopristis, also has multibarbed teeth, but is too distinct in all other aspects to suggest a close relation. The formation of multiple barbs on both sides of the teeth is a characteristic also seen in the extinct Australian sawshark Ikamauius. In general, sclerorynchoids all developed dentition closer to that of sawsharks than modern sawfish, but they are more closely related to the skates. This similarity is considered a case of convergent evolution, where unrelated organisms evolve analogous traits.

Atlanticopristis and Onchopristis exhibit similarities to a Bolivian species of sclerorhynchoid Pucapristis branisi, such as the enamel ribbing and the formation of a barb on the posterior margin, however, their peduncles differ greatly. In 1987, French paleoichthyologist Henri Cappeta distinguished two groups within sclerorhynchoids, separating Onchopristis from Pucapristis.

== Paleoecology ==
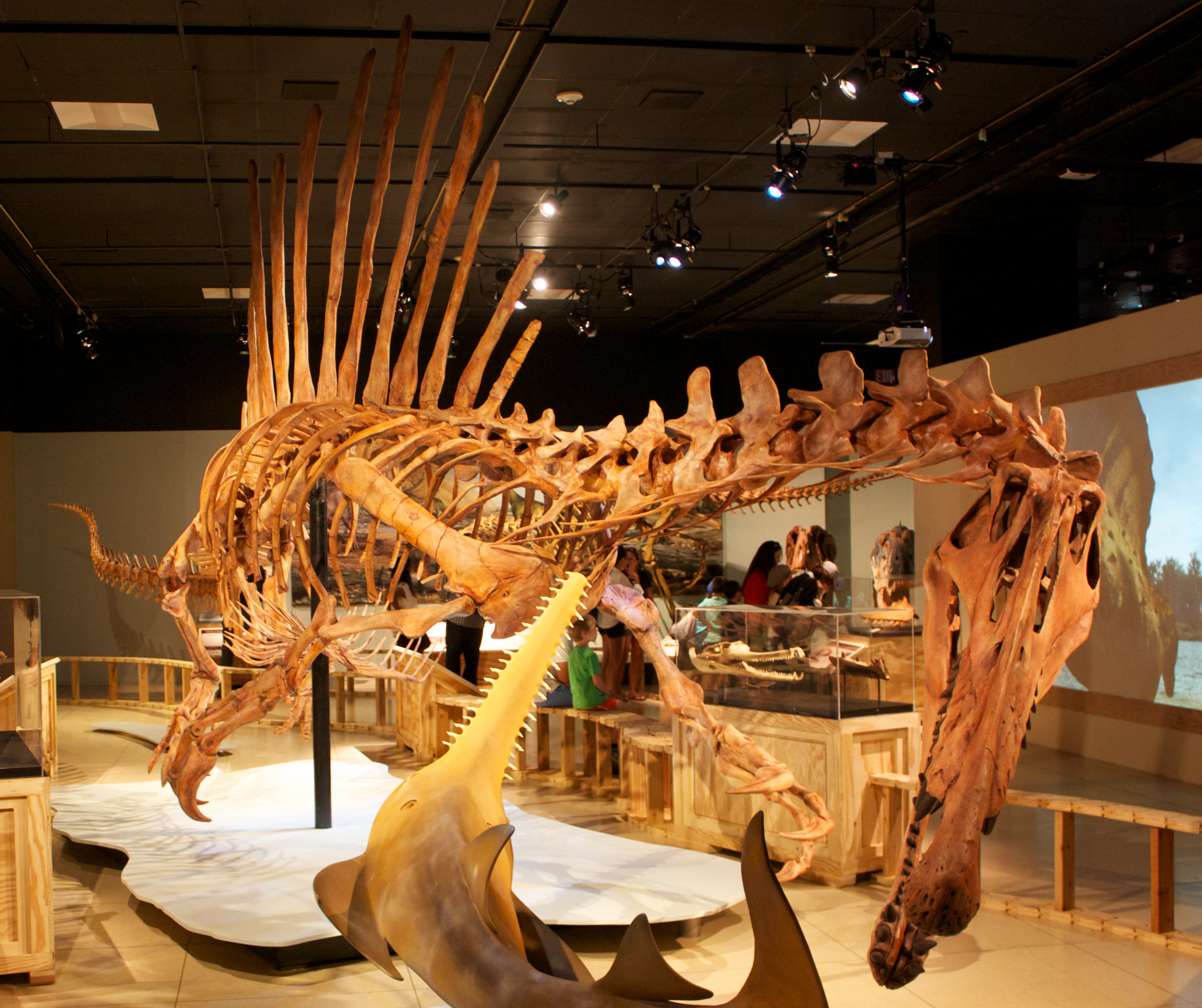
Like Onchopristis (model pictured), Atlanticopristis coexisted with spinosaurids

Atlanticopristis originates from the Alcântara Formation, which is dated to the Cenomanian stage of the Late Cretaceous, sometime between 100.5 and 93.9 million years ago. The formation, composed of Cretaceous sediments, outcrops at the coastline of the São Marcos Bay, and documents the separation of South America and Africa; while presenting a large quantity and variety of continental and marine vertebrates. Fossils from the Alcântara Formation are highly diverse and plentiful, yet often fragmentary. The describers of Atlanticopristis suggested that the taxon likely came from the shallow marine regions of the southern Atlantic Ocean, and periodically entered estuarine waters. The area that is now Laje do Coringa locality would have comprised tidal estuaries of rivers and lagoons, alongside these would have been large forests of conifers, horsetails, and ferns.

Atlanticopristis would have shared its habitat with freshwater, marine, and estuarine fish like the closely related sclerorynchoid Onchopristis cf. O. numida, the large coelacanth Mawsonia gigas, the ray Myliobatis sp. and numerous species of bony fishes, ray-finned fishes, lungfish and marine invertebrates which were prominent in the region, as shown by the many mollusc genera discovered in the deposits. Its remains have also been found in association with those of land-based animals like crocodilians and dinosaurs, including the spinosaurid Oxalaia quilombensis along with other indeterminate theropods and the mesoeucrocodylian Coringasuchus anisodontis.

The paleoecological situation in Cenomanian Brazil highly resembles that of Cenomanian North Africa, particularly the Kem Kem Beds and Bahariya Formation, where many of the same or similar biota can be found in both regions. Researchers have suggested that after the separation of Gondwana, a supercontinent that included Africa and South America, the taxa on each landmass would have continued to evolve separately, contributing to small anatomical differences between the transoceanic taxa.
