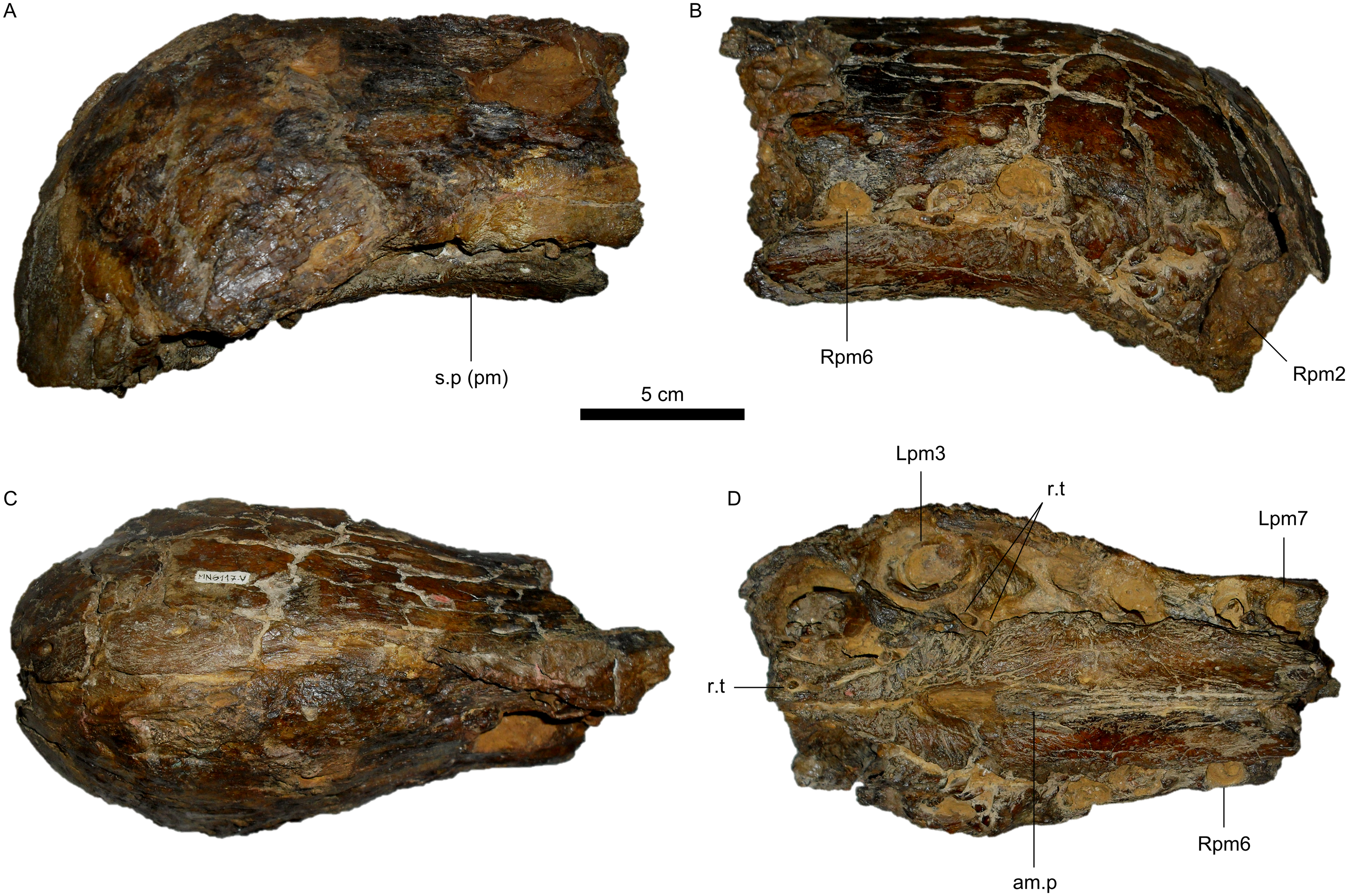
- Holotype snout in multiple views

Scientific classification
- Kingdom: Animalia
- Phylum: Chordata
- Class: Reptilia
- Clade: Dinosauria
- Clade: Saurischia
- Clade: Theropoda
- Family: †Spinosauridae
- Genus: †Oxalaia; Kellner et al., 2011
- Species: †O. quilombensis

Binomial name
- †Oxalaia quilombensis Kellner et al., 2011

Synonyms
- Oxalaia quilimboensis Arden et al., 2018 (lapsus calami)

= Oxalaia =

Oxalaia Temporal range: Late Cretaceous, (Cenomanian) 100.5–93.9 Ma

Extinct genus of dinosaurs

Oxalaia (in reference to the African deity Oxalá) is a genus of spinosaurid dinosaur that lived in what is now the Northeast Region of Brazil during the Cenomanian stage of the Late Cretaceous period, sometime between 100.5 and 93.9 million years ago. Its fossils were found in 1999 on Cajual Island in the rocks of the Alcântara Formation, which is known for its abundance of fragmentary, isolated fossil specimens. The remains of Oxalaia were described in 2011 by Brazilian palaeontologist Alexander Kellner and colleagues, who assigned the specimens to a new genus containing one species, Oxalaia quilombensis. The species name refers to the Brazilian quilombo settlements. Oxalaia quilombensis is the eighth officially named theropod species from Brazil and the largest carnivorous dinosaur discovered there. One study suggested that this taxon is a junior synonym of the closely related African genus Spinosaurus, but some subsequent studies consider the genus to be diagnostic.

Although Oxalaia is known only from two partial skull bones, Kellner and colleagues found that its teeth and cranium had a few distinct features not seen in other spinosaurids or theropods, including two replacement teeth in each socket and a very sculptured secondary palate. Oxalaia's habitat was tropical, heavily forested, and surrounded by an arid landscape. This environment had a large variety of lifeforms also present in Middle-Cretaceous North Africa, due to the connection of South America and Africa as parts of the supercontinent Gondwana. As a spinosaurid, the traits of Oxalaia's skull and dentition indicate a partly piscivorous (fish-eating) lifestyle similar to that of modern crocodilians. Fossil evidence suggests spinosaurids also preyed on other animals such as small dinosaurs and pterosaurs.

== Discovery and naming ==
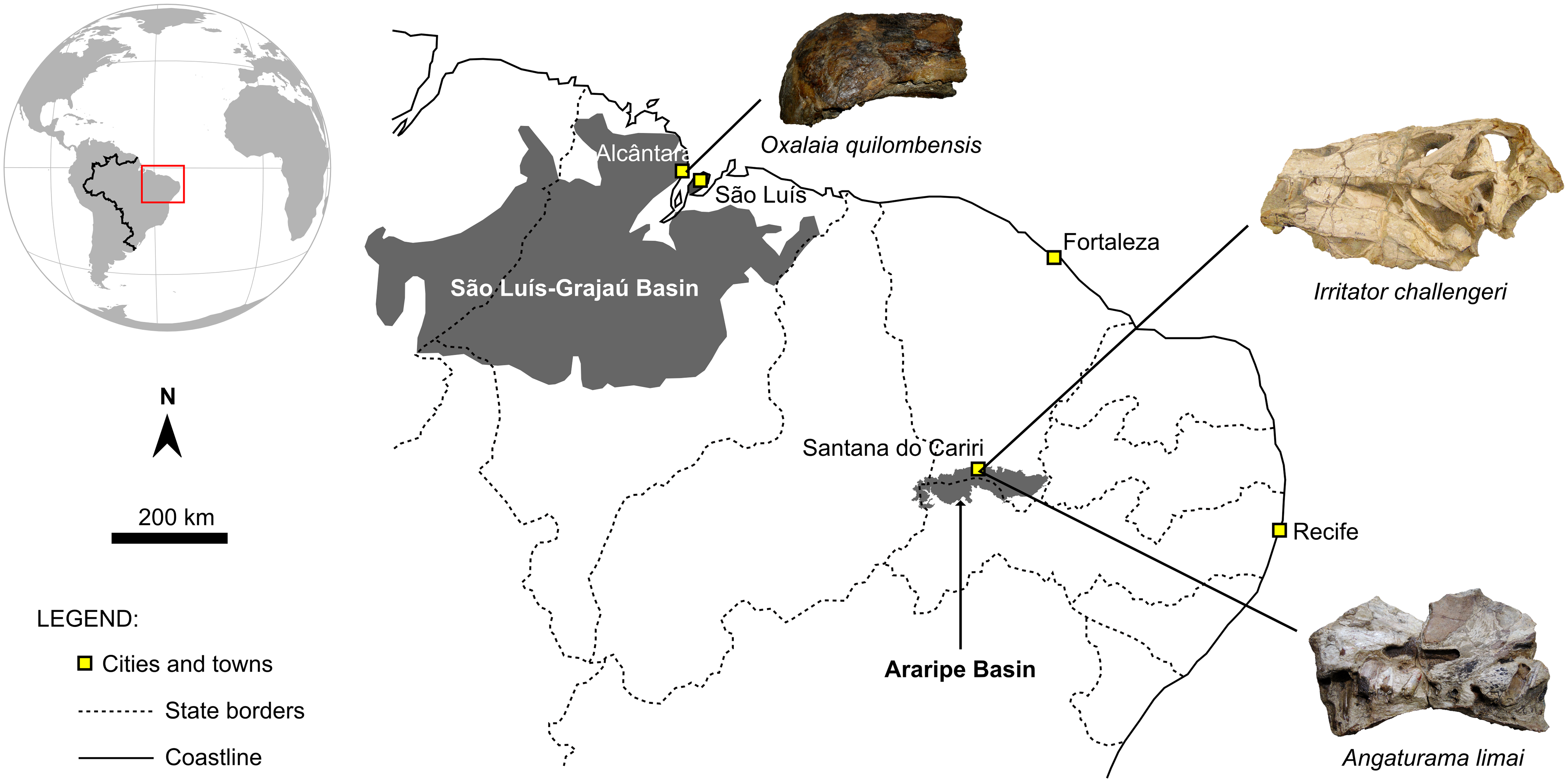
Map showing the Northeast Region of Brazil, with the discovery sites of three spinosaurine fossil specimens in the Araripe and São Luís-Grajaú Basins marked. From top to bottom: Oxalaia, Irritator, and Angaturama.

Oxalaia stems from the Alcântara Formation, a succession of sedimentary rocks that is part of the Itapecuru Group of the São Luís-Grajaú Basin, in northeastern Brazil. These rocks have been dated by scientists to the Cenomanian stage of the Late Cretaceous period, 100.5 to 93.9 million years ago. Outcropping at the northern coast of the formation, the Laje do Coringa locality is made up mostly of sandstones and mudstones, along with conglomerate rock layers containing fossil plant and vertebrate fragments. These sediments were deposited under marine and fluvial conditions similar to those of the Bahariya Formation in Egypt, where Spinosaurus remains have been found. In 1999, fossils of Oxalaia were recovered from the Laje do Coringa. Palaeontologist Elaine Machado, of the National Museum of Rio de Janeiro, was surprised to find such a well-preserved fossil at the site and stated in a press release that "this is how most scientific discoveries happen, it was by accident". The finding was a rare occurrence due to the erosive nature of the tides at the deposit, which are responsible for the fragmented state of most fossils in the bone bed; remains not found on site are often removed from the formation by wave action. Generally, the majority of fossil remains found at the Alcântara Formation consist of teeth and isolated skeletal elements, of which the Laje do Coringa site has yielded hundreds.

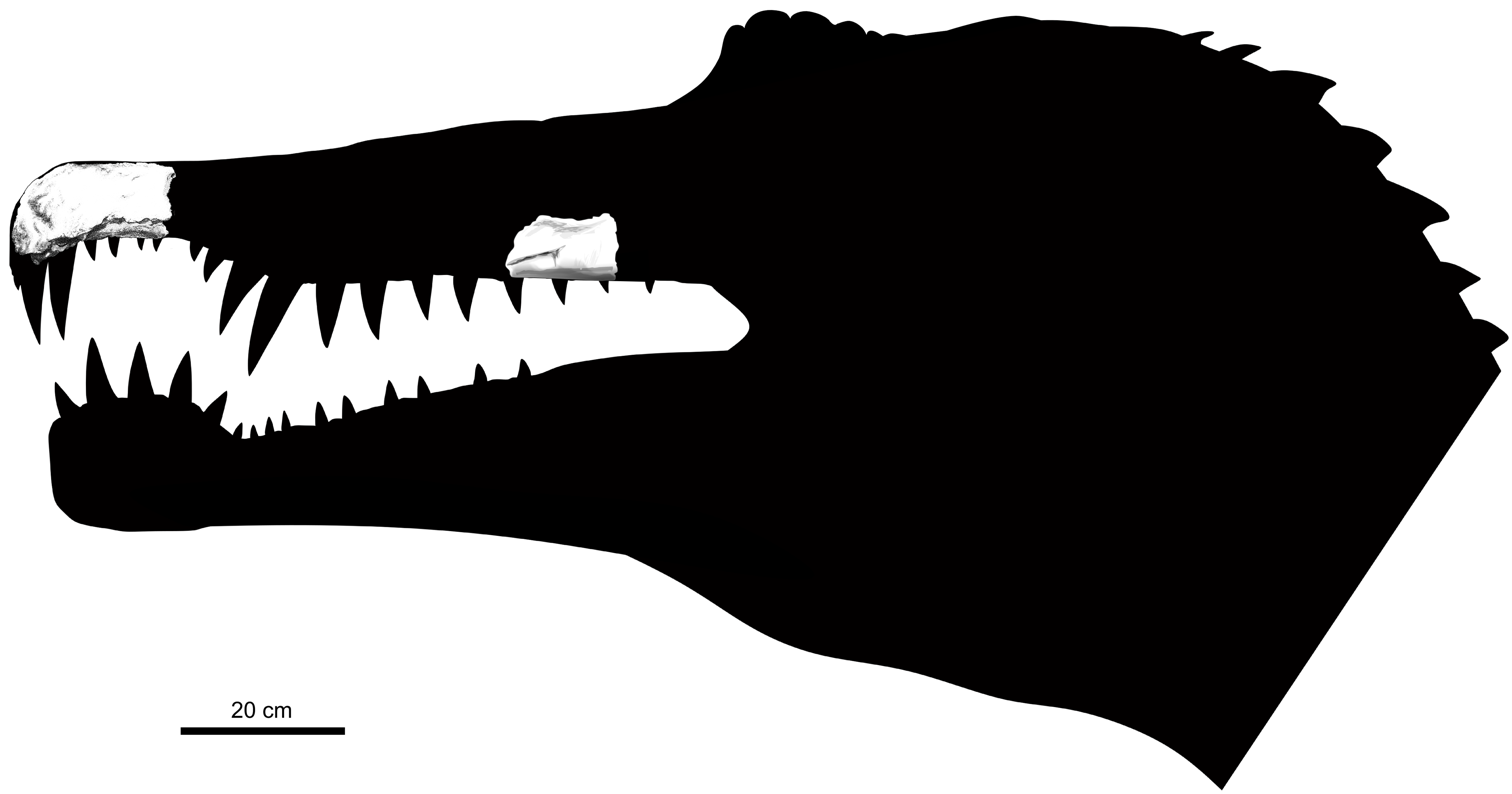
Diagram illustrating known jaw material in place

Oxalaia is one of three spinosaurid dinosaurs discovered in Brazil, the other two being Irritator and its possible synonym Angaturama, both of which were also initially known from partial skulls. They were discovered in the Romualdo Formation of the Santana Group, part of the Araripe Basin. Microfossils date this formation to the Albian, around nine to six million years before Oxalaia. The fossil record of spinosaurids is poor compared to those of other theropod groups; very few body fossils are known and most genera have been erected from isolated elements such as vertebra or teeth. The holotype specimen of Oxalaia quilombensis, designated MN 6117-V, was found in situ (at its original place of deposition) with part of the left side embedded in the rock matrix; it consists of the fused premaxillae (frontmost snout bones) from a large individual. An isolated and incomplete left maxilla (main upper jaw bone) fragment (MN 6119-V) was referred to Oxalaia because it showed the same general traits occurring in spinosaurids, the maxilla was discovered on the rock surface, having possibly moved from its original location after erosion. Both bone fragments were found on Cajual Island, Maranhão, in the Northeast Region of Brazil, and were housed at the National Museum of Rio de Janeiro. In 2018, a fire engulfed the palace housing the museum, possibly destroying Oxalaia's specimens, along with various other fossils found in Brazil. It was noted by paleontologist Rubi Pêgas in 2025 that the badly damaged remains of Oxalaia were recovered, and the publication for the recovered items is in preparation. Besides the partial skull bones, numerous spinosaurid teeth had earlier been reported from the Laje do Coringa site. Additionally, two distal caudal vertebra (specimens UFMA 1.10.229 and UFMA 1.10.240) discovered in the Alcantara Formation of Brazil were assigned to Sigilmassasaurus in 2002. However, other researchers noted that these specimens are indeterminate spinosaurids, most likely belonging to Oxalaia considering the geographical and geological context.

The discoveries of Oxalaia and of the Late Cretaceous reptiles Pepesuchus and Brasiliguana were announced in a presentation by the Brazilian Academy of Sciences in March 2011. Machado described Oxalaia as "the dominant reptile of [what is now] Cajual Island". She stated that there is interest in spinosaurids in Brazil and abroad because of their debut in the Jurassic Park franchise and their distinctiveness among other carnivorous dinosaurs. The species description of Oxalaia was written by Brazilian palaeontologists Alexander Kellner, Elaine Machado, Sergio Azevedo, Deise Henriques, and Luciana Carvalho. This paper, among many others, were composed into a volume of 20 works on prehistoric biodiversity that was published by the academy in March 2011. The type species Oxalaia quilombensis is the eighth officially named species of theropod from Brazil. The generic name Oxalaia is derived from the name of the African deity Oxalá, which was introduced into Brazil during the slavery period. The specific name quilombensis refers to the quilombo settlements like those on Cajual Island, which were founded by escaped slaves.

== Description ==
Tentative size estimate, with the animal in a swimming position

The holotype premaxillae are together approximately 201 millimetres (7.9 inches) long, with a preserved width of 115 mm (4.5 in) (maximal estimated original width is 126 mm (5.0 in)), and a height of 103 mm (4.1 in). Based on skeletal material from related spinosaurids, the skull of Oxalaia would have been an estimated 1.35 metres (4.4 feet) long; this is smaller than Spinosaurus's skull, which was approximated at 1.75 m (5 ft 9 in) long by Italian palaeontologist Cristiano Dal Sasso and colleagues in 2005. Kellner and his team compared the Dal Sasso specimen (MSNM V4047) to Oxalaia's original snout in 2011; from this they estimated Oxalaia at 12 to 14 m (39 to 46 ft) in length and 5 to 7 tonnes (5.5 to 7.7 short tons; 4.9 to 6.9 long tons) in weight, making it the largest known theropod from Brazil, the second largest being Pycnonemosaurus, which was estimated at 8.9 m (29 ft) by one study.

The tip of the rostrum (snout) is enlarged and the rear-end constricted, forming the terminal rosette shape that distinguishes spinosaurids; this form would have interlocked with the also-expanded front of the dentary (tooth-bearing bone of the mandible). The rostrum of Oxalaia features broad, deep foramina (holes) that are possibly nutrient canals for blood vessels and nerves; it is also rounder in side view than that of Spinosaurus, whose upper jaw ends in a more acute downward angle as shown by specimens MSNM V4047 and MNHN SAM 124. The maxillae show a pair of elongated and thin processes extending forwards along the midline of the roof of the mouth; they are encased between the premaxillae and border an elaborate, triangle-shaped pit at their front end. Similar processes are present in Suchomimus, Cristatusaurus, and MNHN SAM 124, although not as exposed. These structures compose the animal's secondary palate. The undersides of the premaxillae are greatly ornamented in Oxalaia, in contrast to the smoother condition it has in other spinosaurids.

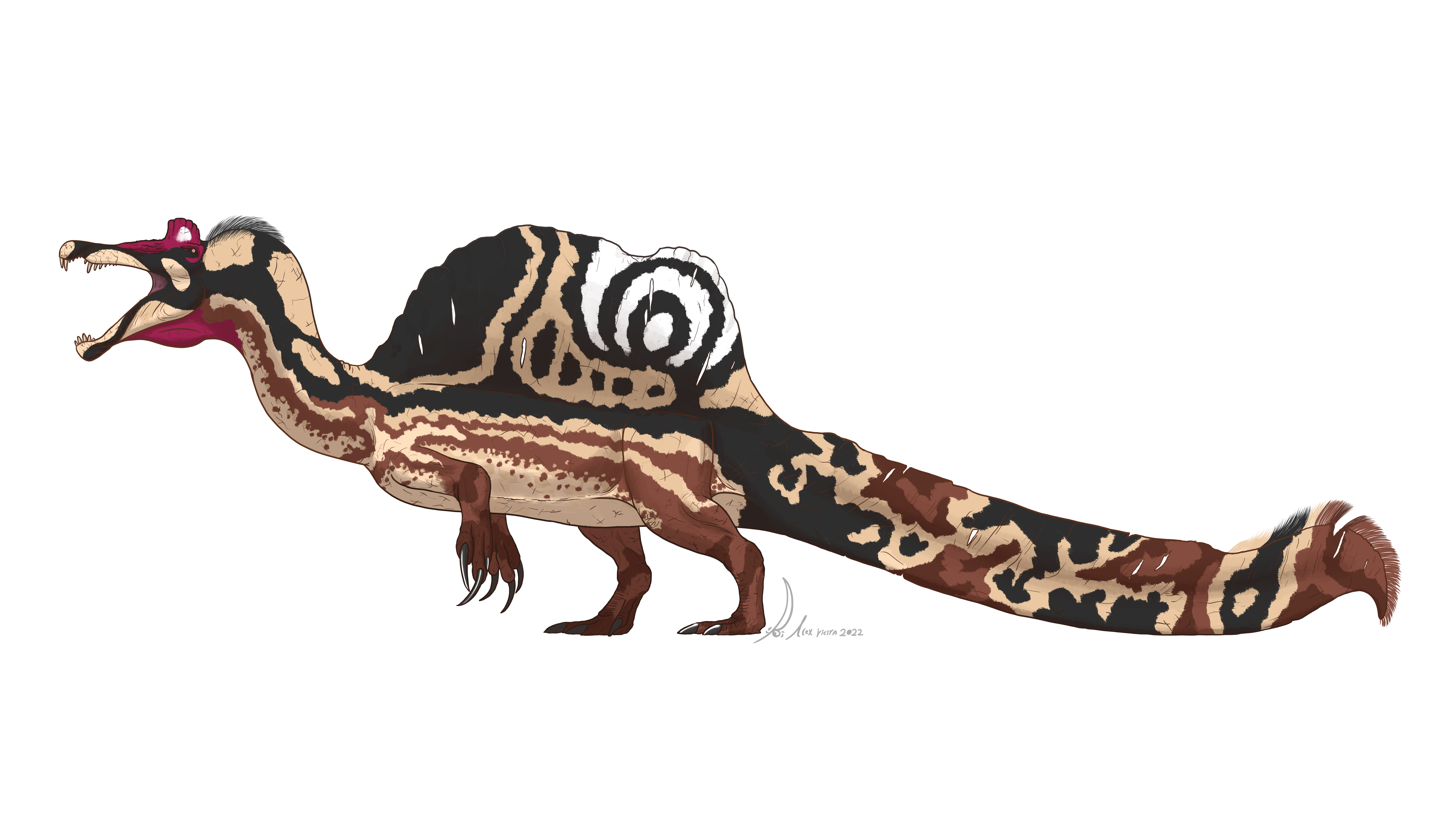
Hypothetical life restoration based on relatives

The premaxillae have seven alveoli (tooth sockets) on each side, the same number found in Angaturama, Cristatusaurus, Suchomimus, and MNHN SAM 124 (referred to Spinosaurus); MSNM V4047, another upper jaw specimen from Spinosaurus, had only six. It cannot be confirmed whether this lower number of teeth is due to ontogeny; for that, a larger sample size is necessary. A large diastema (gap in tooth row) separates the third tooth socket from the fourth; this is observed in all other spinosaurids, being smaller in Suchomimus. Another diastema of nearly equal length is found between the fifth and sixth alveolus; this diastema is seen in MNHN SAM 124 and is much longer in MSNM V4047 but is absent from Suchomimus and Cristatusaurus. The maxilla fragment referred to Oxalaia (MN 6119-V) has two alveoli and a broken third one that includes a partial tooth. Like the premaxilla, it had preserved nutrient canals. It also features a shallow dent in the middle, suggesting it was located near the external nares (bony nostrils). Small fragments inside some of the remaining alveoli show that unlike its Early Cretaceous relatives Suchomimus and Cristatusaurus, Oxalaia lacked serrations on its teeth. Apart from the single, functional tooth in each socket, there were two replacement teeth, which according to Kellner are "a common feature in sharks or in some reptiles, but not in theropods". A cross-section of the teeth showed the typical oval shape exhibited by spinosaurs rather than the lateral compression of other theropod teeth.

The spinosaurid teeth reported from Laje do Coringa were classified into two primary morphotypes by Brazilian palaeontologist Manuel Medeiros in 2006. Both show typical spinosaurine dentition, though morphotype II has smoother tooth enamel than the first. Oxalaia's teeth display a closer morphology to morphotype I while the second grouping of teeth represent either worn down morphotype I teeth or an undescribed spinosaurine from the Alcântara Formation.

== Classification ==
Size of various spinosaurids (Oxalaia in green, third from left) compared with a human

The type elements of Oxalaia closely resemble those of specimens MSNM V4047 and MNHN SAM 124, both referred to Spinosaurus aegyptiacus. Kellner and colleagues differentiated Oxalaia from it and other spinosaurids by its autapomorphic (distinguishing) craniodental features, like its sculptured palatal part of the premaxillae, and the possession of two replacement teeth in each position. More fragmentary spinosaurids such as Siamosaurus and "Sinopliosaurus" fusuiensis are based only on teeth, making them difficult to separate from other taxa. The habit of naming theropods from isolated teeth or tooth fragments has resulted in many invalid and synonymous genera; it has also occurred with spinosaurids and is compounded by the common lack of overlapping skeletal remains—a precondition of validly distinguishing taxa.

Labeled skull diagram of the related and possibly synonymus Spinosaurus

In 2017, a phylogenetic analysis by the Brazilian palaeontologists Marcos Sales and Cesar Schultz concluded that Oxalaia was more closely related to African spinosaurines than to Brazilian spinosaurines like Angaturama, as indicated by a wider snout and the lack of a dorsal sagittal crest on the premaxillae. The Brazilian genera Oxalaia and Angaturama were recovered as the two closest relatives of Spinosaurus, Oxalaia forming its sister taxon. Though fragmentary, the Brazilian material indicates that spinosaurines were more diverse than previously recognized. Spinosaurus differs from Oxalaia by its significantly more widely spaced tooth sockets, the presence of a slight narrowing between its third and fourth sockets, and the sharper slope of its snout. Oxalaia is currently assigned to the subfamily Spinosaurinae due to the morphology of its upper jaw and the absence of fine serrations on its teeth that typify baryonychines. Below is a cladogram by Sales and Schultz, in which Oxalaia is grouped in the Spinosaurinae, as a closer relative to Spinosaurus than Angaturama.

- Spinosauridae
  - Baryonyx
  - Cristatusaurus
  - Suchomimus
  - - Angaturama
    - - Oxalaia
      - Spinosaurus

In contrast, Arden et al. (2018) recovered Oxalaia in a polytomy with Irritator and Spinosaurini in their phylogenetic analysis, the cladogram of which is reproduced below:

- Spinosauridae
  - Praia das Aguncheiras taxon
  - Baryonychinae
    - Baryonyx walkeri
    - Suchomimus tenerensis
  - Spinosaurinae
    - Siamosaurus suteethorni
    - - Eumeralla taxon
      - - Ichthyovenator laosensis
        - - Irritator challengeri
          - Oxalaia quilombensis
          - Spinosaurini
            - Gara Samani taxon
            - Sigilmassasaurus brevicollis
            - Spinosaurus aegyptiacus

In 2020, a paper by Robert Smyth and colleagues assessing spinosaurines from the Kem Kem Group did not find the autapomorphies of Oxalaia quilombensis sufficient to warrant a separate taxon, but instead considered them a result of individual variation. The authors thus considered the species a junior synonym of Spinosaurus aegyptiacus. If supported by future studies, this would imply Spinosaurus aegyptiacus had a wider distribution and support a faunal exchange scenario between South America and Africa during the Cenomanian when there was little separation of South America and Africa by water, which allowed Spinosaurus aegyptiacus to traverse the short distance of the sea into South America.

However, subsequent studies have rejected its synonymy with Spinosaurus aegyptiacus based on diagnostic features of the holotype (MN 6117-V) and the referred specimen (MN 6119-V). In 2021, Lacerda, Grillo and Romano noted that the anteromedial processes of the holotype maxillae (MN 6117-V) contact medially, a condition not observed in MSNM V4047 which has been referred to as a specimen of Spinosaurus, and thus adding a new possible diagnostic feature of Oxalaia. They also suggested that the premaxilla of Oxalaia is wider in the posterior portion than that of MSNM V4047, and that the lateral morphology of its rostrum was distinguished from other spinosaurines based on their morphometric analysis. In 2023, Isasmendi and colleagues considered Oxalaia as a valid taxon based on the examination of its referred maxilla (MN 6119-V) which suggests that the position of its external naris would have been more anteriorly located, a condition similar to that of Irritator and baryonychines, differing from Spinosaurus aegyptiacus.

== Palaeoecology ==
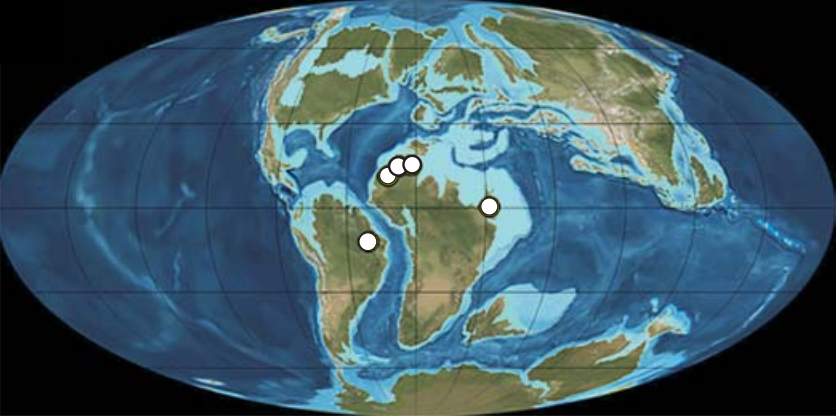
Generalised locations of spinosaurid fossil discoveries from the Albian-Cenomanian, 113 to 93.9 million years ago, marked on a map of that time span.

The Late Cretaceous deposits of the Alcântara Formation have been interpreted as a humid habitat of tropical forests dominated by conifers, ferns, and horsetails. These forests were surrounded by an arid-to-semi-arid landscape that was probably subjected to brief periods of heavy rainfall followed by lengthy dry periods. A great abundance and variety of animal taxa, such as dinosaurs, pterosaurs, snakes, molluscs, crocodilians, notosuchids, and fish have been discovered in the formation. Aquatic taxa known from the deposits include the large coelacanth Mawsonia gigas; the ray Myliobatis sp. (of uncertain species); two sclerorhynchid sawfishes; as well as several bony fish, ray-finned fish, and lungfish species. Dinosaur fossil remains suggest the presence of diplodocoids like Itapeuasaurus cajapioensis, basal titanosaurs, a giant Carcharodontosaurid sp., a noasaurid closely related to Masiakasaurus, and a dromaeosaurid. Also, characteristic teeth and a vertebral centra were referred to Spinosaurus sp.

Most of the flora and fauna discovered in the Alcântara Formation was also present in North Africa in the Kem Kem Beds of Morocco during the Cenomanian; with a few exceptions including Oxalaia quilombensis, Atlanticopristis equatorialis, Equinoxiodus alcantariensis, and Coringasuchus anisodontis. According to Medeiros and colleagues, the Laje do Coringa assemblage may also be linked to the contemporaneous Bahariya Formation in Egypt, which holds a distinct combination of key taxa constituting Spinosaurus aegyptiacus, Carcharodontosaurus saharicus, and Onchopristis numidus. This extreme similarity between the Cretaceous biota of Brazil with that of Africa is a result of their connection as parts of the supercontinent Gondwana (which comprised most landmasses of the modern southern hemisphere). This connection was broken by rifting and sea-floor spreading 130–110 million years ago. Afterwards, the transoceanic assemblages would have continued to evolve separately, contributing to small differences between taxa. Machado stated that Cajual Island was still attached to the African continent during the Cenomanian. Similarly, Medeiros and colleagues noted that the presence of an island chain or other lasting land connection during that time could explain the faunal similarities.

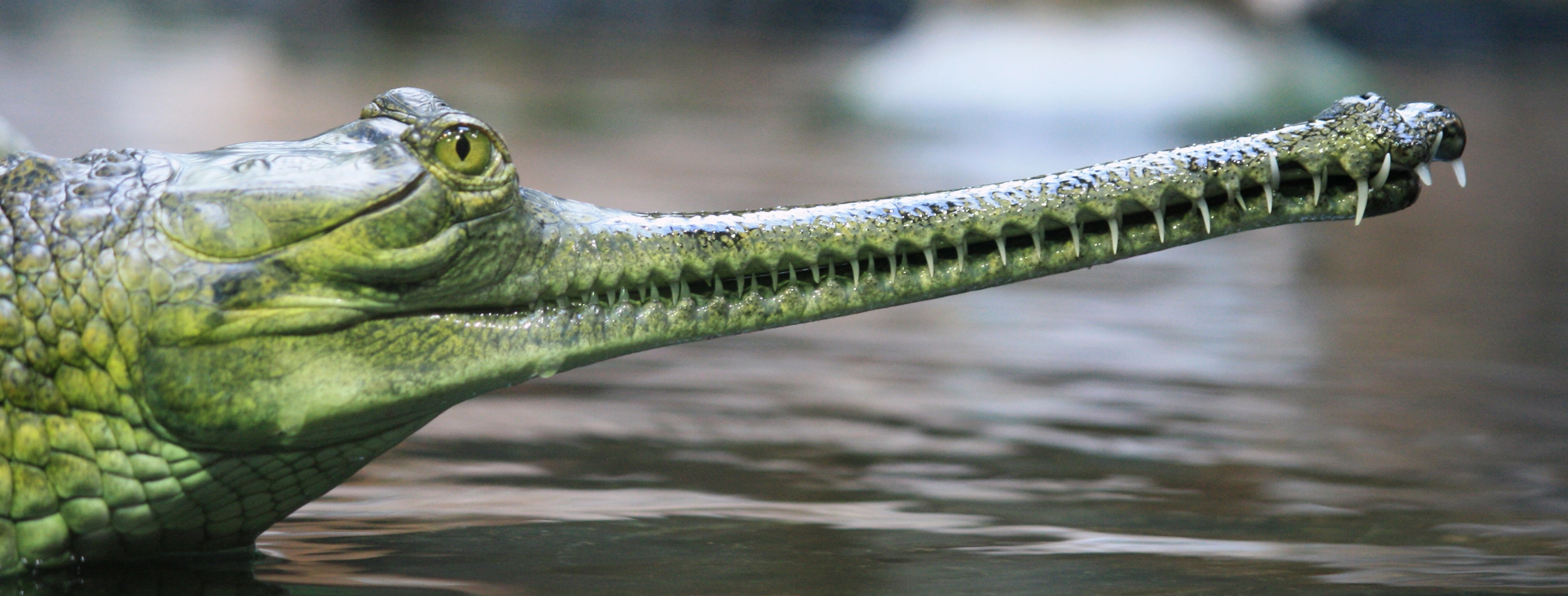
An Indian gharial, displaying the same interlocking rosette shape seen in spinosaurid snout tips

As a spinosaur, Oxalaia would have had large, robust forelimbs; relatively short hindlimbs; elongated neural spines (upwards projections of the vertebrae) forming a ridge or sail on its back; and tall neural spines on its caudal vertebrae which—similar to the tails of modern crocodilians—may have aided in swimming. Spinosaurids likely spent most of their time near or in water and fed mostly on aquatic animals, avoiding direct competition with other large predators but being able to sustain themselves on terrestrial animals if necessary. Such behavior is observed in cases such as juvenile Iguanodontid bones found in the stomach cavity of a Baryonyx fossil and an Irritator tooth embedded in pterosaur remains. The conical, transversely oval-shaped teeth of Oxalaia and its nasal openings, that were retracted further back on the skull than in most theropods (likely to avoid water entering its nostrils while fishing) are characteristic of spinosaurids. Both features are useful adaptations for catching and feeding on fish. The expanded, interlocking front jaws and piercing teeth of spinosaurs worked as an efficient fish trap, a trait also exhibited by the Indian gharial—the most piscivorous extant crocodilian. Kellner compared the general appearance of spinosaurid skulls to those of alligators.
