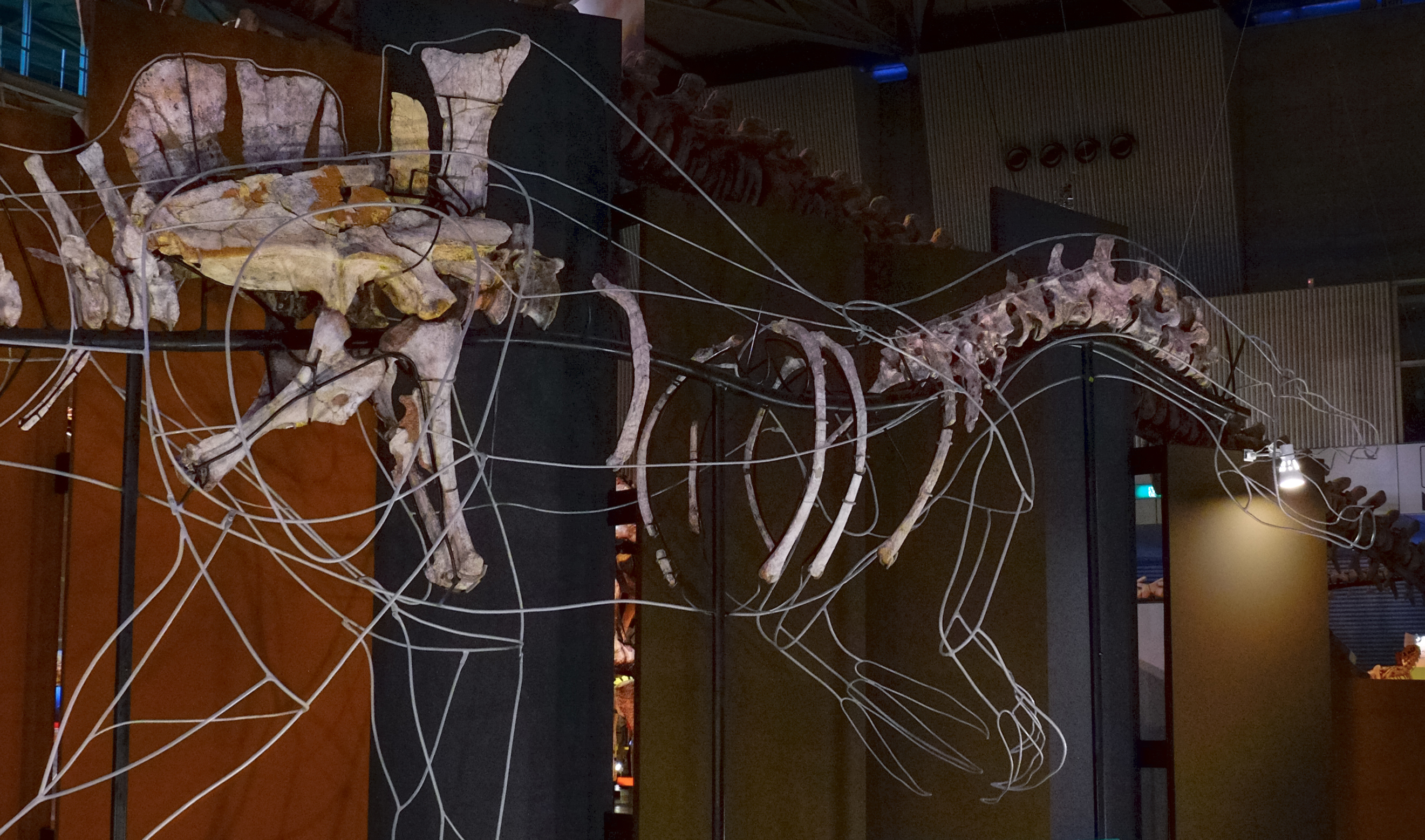
- Mounted holotype skeleton at the National Museum of Nature and Science, Tokyo

Scientific classification
- Kingdom: Animalia
- Phylum: Chordata
- Class: Reptilia
- Clade: Dinosauria
- Clade: Saurischia
- Clade: Theropoda
- Family: †Spinosauridae
- Subfamily: †Spinosaurinae
- Genus: †Ichthyovenator; Allain et al., 2012

Type species
- †Ichthyovenator laosensis Allain et al., 2012

= Ichthyovenator =

Ichthyovenator Temporal range: Early Cretaceous, (Aptian) 120–113 Ma

Genus of dinosaur

Ichthyovenator is a genus of spinosaurid dinosaur that lived in what is now Laos, sometime between 120 and 113 million years ago, during the Aptian stage of the Early Cretaceous period. It is known from fossils collected from the Grès supérieurs Formation of the Savannakhet Basin, the first of which were found in 2010, consisting of a partial skeleton without the skull or limbs. This specimen became the holotype of the new genus and species Ichthyovenator laosensis, and was described by palaeontologist Ronan Allain and colleagues in 2012. The generic name, meaning "fish hunter", refers to its assumed piscivorous lifestyle, while the specific name alludes to the country of Laos. In 2014, it was announced that more remains from the dig site had been recovered; these fossils included teeth, more vertebrae (backbones) and a pubic bone from the same individual.

The holotype specimen is estimated to have been between 8.5 to 10.5 metres (28 to 34 feet) long and to have weighed 2.4 tonnes (2.6 short tons; 2.4 long tons). Ichthyovenator's teeth were straight and conical, and its neck resembled that of the closely related genus Sigilmassasaurus (which may be synonymous with Spinosaurus). Like others in its family, Ichthyovenator had tall neural spines that formed a sail on its back. Unlike other known spinosaurids, Ichthyovenator's sail had a sinusoidal (wave-like) shape that curved downwards over the hips and divided into two separate sails. The pelvic girdle was reduced; the ilium—the uppermost body of the pelvis—was proportionately longer than both the pubis and ischium than in other known theropod dinosaurs. Ichthyovenator was initially thought to belong to the subfamily Baryonychinae but more recent analyses place it as a primitive member of the Spinosaurinae.

As a spinosaur, Ichthyovenator would have had a long, shallow snout and robust forelimbs. Its diet likely mainly consisted of aquatic prey, hence its etymology. Spinosaurids are also known to have eaten small dinosaurs and pterosaurs in addition to fish. Ichthyovenator's conspicuous sail might have been used for sexual display or species recognition. Fossil evidence suggests spinosaurids, especially spinosaurines, were adapted for semiaquatic lifestyles. The vertebral spines of Ichthyovenator's tail were unusually tall, suggesting—as in today's crocodilians—the tail may have aided in swimming. Ichthyovenator lived alongside sauropod and ornithopod dinosaurs, as well as bivalves, fish and turtles.

== Discovery and naming ==
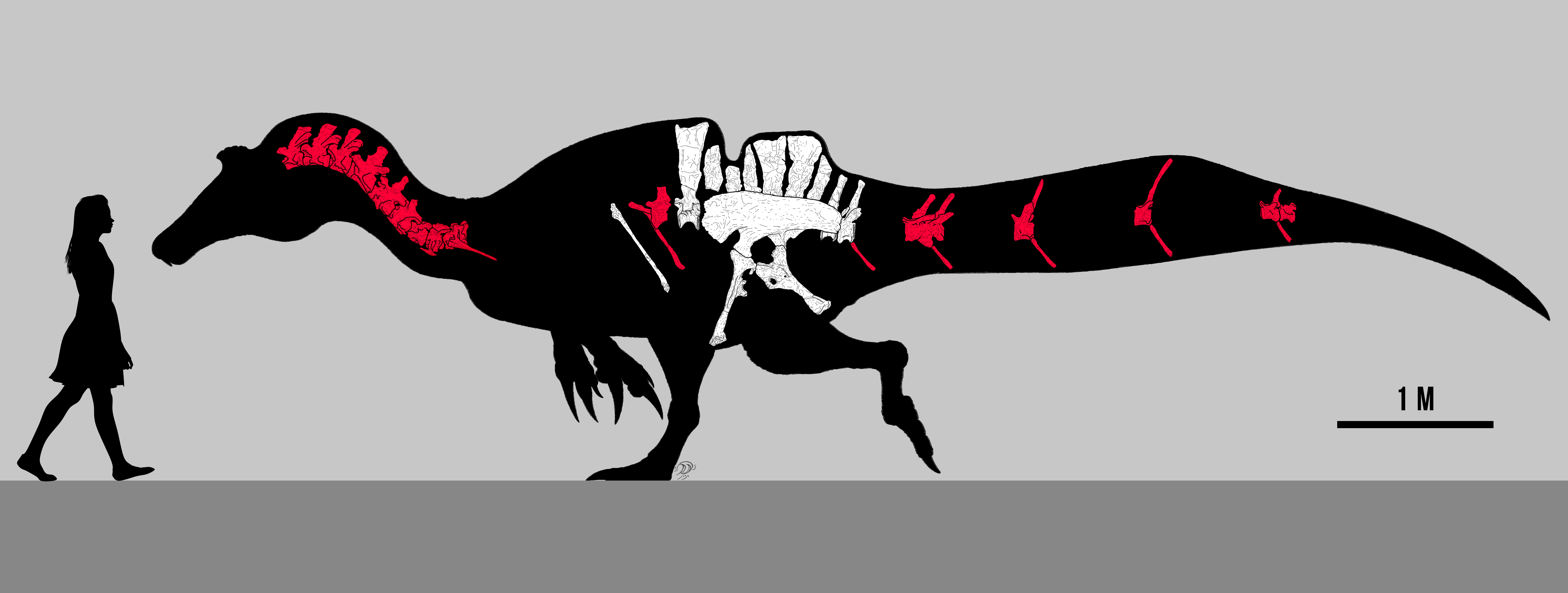
Skeletal diagram with holotype fossils in white and undescribed material in red

The first fossils of Ichthyovenator were found in 2010 at Ban Kalum in the Grès supérieurs Formation of the Savannakhet Basin in Savannakhet Province, Laos. These fossilized bones were recovered from a red sandstone layer within a surface area of less than 2 square metres (22 sq ft). Designated under the specimen numbers MDS BK10-01 to 15, they consist of a partly articulated, well-preserved skeleton lacking the skull and limbs, and including the third-to-last dorsal (back) vertebra, the neural spine of the last dorsal vertebra, five partial sacral (hip) vertebrae, the first two caudal (tail) vertebrae, both ilia (main hip bones), a right pubis (pubic bone), both ischia (lower and rearmost hip bones) and a posterior dorsal rib. The twelfth dorsal spine is bent sideways when viewed front-to-back due to taphonomic distortion. The centra (vertebral bodies) of the sacrals are largely incomplete due to erosion, but preserved all of their accompanying spines with their upper edges intact. At the time of Ichthyovenator's description, excavations at the site were still ongoing.

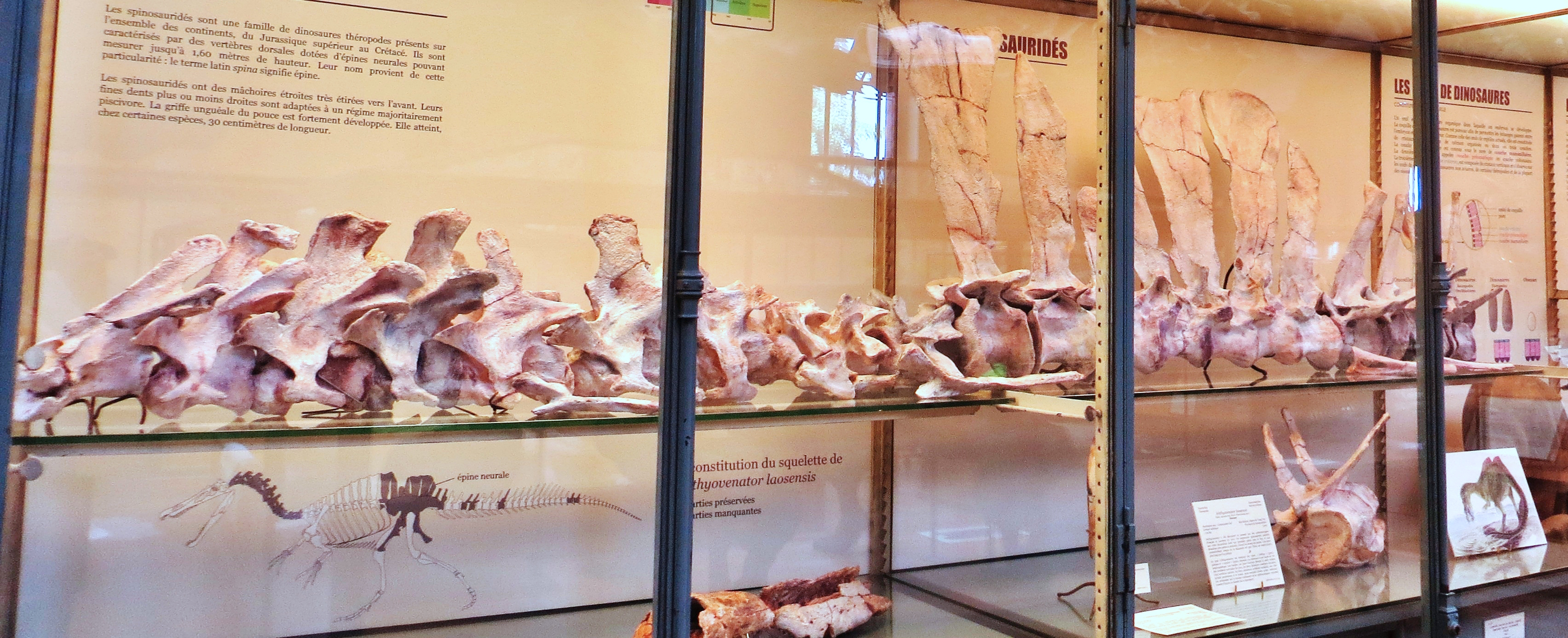
Casts of the vertebrae at the Muséum National d'Histoire Naturelle, Paris

After undergoing preparation in 2011, the skeleton was used as the basis, or holotype, for the type species Ichthyovenator laosensis, which was named and described in 2012 by palaeontologists Ronan Allain, Tiengkham Xeisanavong, Philippe Richir, and Bounsou Khentavong. The generic name is derived from the Old Greek word ἰχθύς (ichthys), "fish", and the Latin word venator, "hunter", in reference to its likely piscivorous (fish-eating) lifestyle. The specific name refers to its provenance from Laos. Ichthyovenator is the third named spinosaurid dinosaur from Asia after the Thai genus Siamosaurus in 1986 and the Chinese species "Sinopliosaurus" fusuiensis in 2009. The latter may represent the same animal as Siamosaurus. In 2014, Allain published a conference paper on Ichthyovenator; the abstract indicated additional remains from the original individual had been found after excavations continued in 2012. These remains include three teeth, the left pubis, and many vertebrae, including a nearly complete neck, the first dorsal vertebra, and seven more caudal vertebrae. Some of these additional vertebrae were compared with those of other spinosaurids in a 2015 paper by German palaeontologist Serjoscha Evers and colleagues, in which they noted similarities with the vertebrae of the African spinosaurid Sigilmassasaurus.

== Description ==
Size of various spinosaurids (Ichthyovenator in turquoise, first from right) compared with a human

In 2016, Gregory S. Paul estimated Ichthyovenator to have been approximately 8.5 metres (28 ft) long and to have weighed 2 tonnes (2.2 short tons; 2.0 long tons). The same year, Rubén Molina-Pérez and Asier Larramendi gave an estimate of 10.5 m (34 ft) in length, 2.95 m (9 ft 8 in) tall at the hips, and 2.4 t (2.6 short tons; 2.4 long tons) in weight.

Ichthyovenator's teeth were conical, straight, and bore no serrations. The front edges of the maxillary and dentary teeth were evident on the base of the tooth crown. The front articulating surfaces of Ichthyovenator's rear cervical and front dorsal vertebrae were one-and-a-half times wider than they were high and wider than the length of their centra. They also bore robust front tubercles (processes for skeletal muscle attachment) and lacked interzygapophyseal laminae (bony plates), which resulted in their spinopre- and spinopostzygapophyseal fossae (depressions) having open undersides. The first dorsal vertebra had extensive transverse processes (wing-like projections that articulate with the ribs), as well as deep excavations at the front and back of its base that were filled by air sacs in life. The parapophyses (processes that articulated with the capitulum of the ribs) increased in height from the rear cervicals to the first dorsal; its underside remained in contact with the front lower edge of the centrum. This is unlike the condition in most theropods, in which the parapophyses shifted towards the top of the vertebra during the transition from cervical to dorsal vertebrae. All of these features were also present in Sigilmassasaurus. Ichthyovenator's mid-cervical vertebrae had elongate, somewhat wider-than-tall centra that became progressively shorter towards the rear of the neck, as well as well-developed keels on their bottom surfaces, traits that were shared with the spinosaurids Baryonyx, Suchomimus, Sigilmassasaurus, and Vallibonavenatrix. The cervical neural spines of Ichthyovenator were taller than in Sigilmassasaurus and Baryonyx but shared the blade-like shape with those two taxa at the mid-cervicals. The holotype dorsal rib, which was found near the twelfth dorsal vertebra, had a head typical of the ribs of other moderate-to-large-sized theropods. The rib shaft formed a half-circle. The rib's lower end was slightly expanded both sideways and to the front and back. This condition, which differs from the tapered, pointed tips seen in the ribs of other theropods, suggests the rearmost dorsal ribs articulated with the complex of the sternum (breast bone).

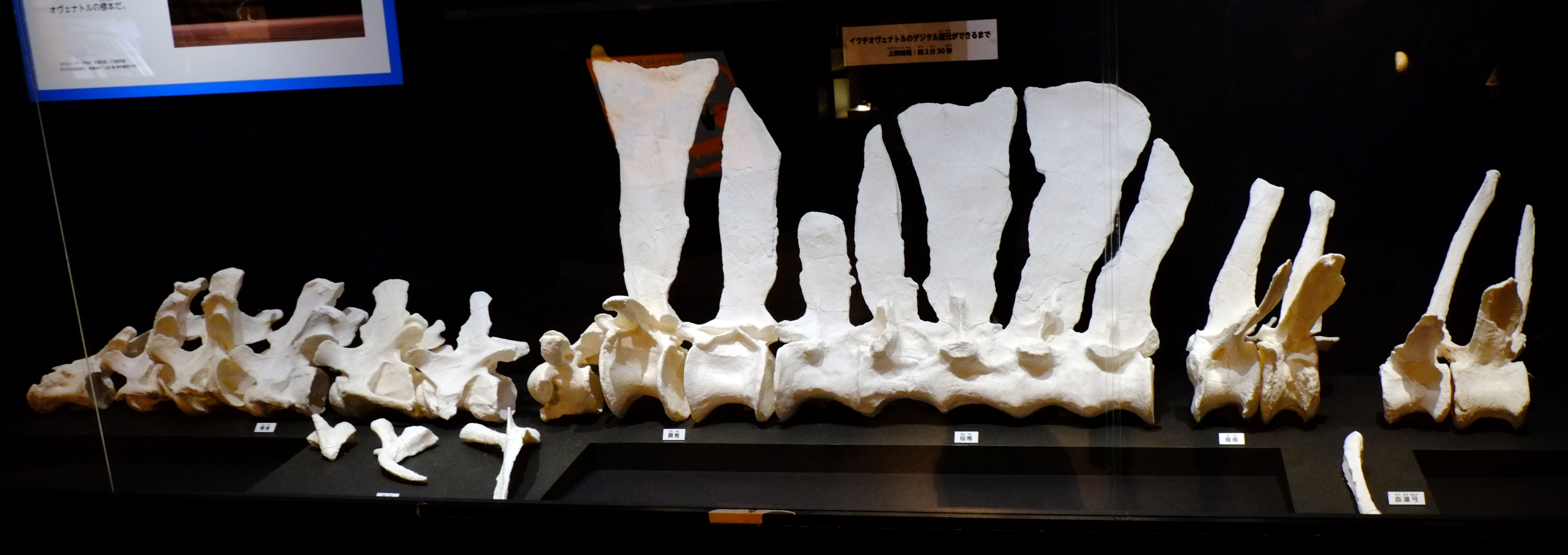
Casts of the known spinal column at the National Museum of Nature and Science, Tokyo. The thirteenth dorsal spine and the lower part of the sacrum have been partially reconstructed.

Like many other spinosaurids, Ichthyovenator had a sail on its back and hips that was formed by the elongated neural spines of its vertebrae. Uniquely among known members of the family, Ichthyovenator's sail was divided in two over the hips and had a sinusoid (wave-like) curvature. This is in contrast to the related genera Spinosaurus and Suchomimus—both of which had continuous sails that rose to a peak before sloping down again—and Baryonyx, which showed a less-developed sail, having much lower dorsal spines. Ichthyovenator's preserved dorsal and sacral spinal column, which is over 1 m (3 ft 3 in) long, shows a very high spine on the twelfth dorsal vertebra representing a crest that rose from the back and a lower rounded sail that extended from the sacral vertebrae of the hips; the latter sail's apex was located above the third and fourth sacrals. The 54.6-centimetre (21.5 in) high spine of the twelfth dorsal vertebra widened towards the top, giving it a trapezoidal shape—similar to the condition seen in a neural spine from Vallibonavenatrix—whereas the spines of other known spinosaurids were roughly rectangular. It also lacked the forward or backward inclination of Spinosaurus's neural spines. Its front corner formed a 3-centimetre (1.2 in) narrow-process, pointing upwards. The spine of the thirteenth dorsal vertebra has been only partly preserved; its upper and lower ends had broken off from taphonomic causes. From its general shape, the describers inferred however, it was about as long as the preceding spine. This would imply the back edge of the front sail would form a rectangular corner, because the spine of the much lower first sacral vertebra is about 21 cm (8.3 in), creating a sudden hiatus in the sail's profile. The spine of the second sacral vertebra steeply curved upwards again, joining the 39 cm (15 in) and 48 cm (19 in) high, broad, fan-shaped spines of the third and fourth sacrals. The 40 cm (16 in) tall spine of the fifth sacral gradually descended. Unlike in the sails of most other theropods, including that of Suchomimus, the sacral spines were not fused and had no extensive contacts. The second and third sacral centra were fused; the suture connecting them was still visible. Only the rearmost two dorsal vertebrae are preserved, so to what extent the dorsal sail continued towards the front of the animal's back is unknown.

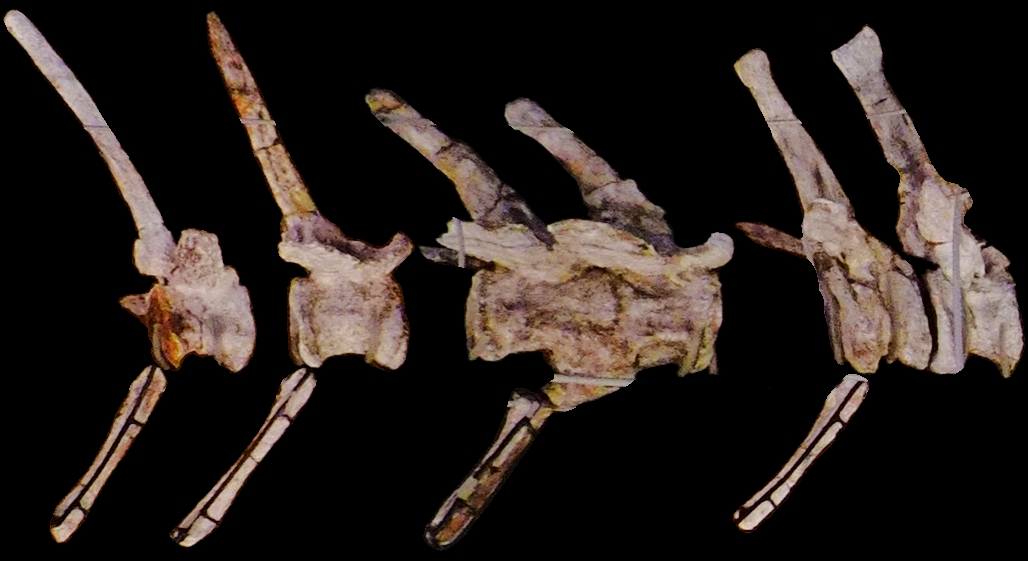
Various caudal (tail) vertebrae and chevrons from the holotype

The sacral sail was continued by the spines of the first two caudal vertebrae, which were 28.4 cm (11.2 in) and 25.7 cm (10.1 in) tall respectively. They leaned backwards at 30 degrees and had smooth front and rear edges. The centra of the first two caudals were much broader than long and amphicoelous (deeply concave on both ends). The caudal transverse processes were prominent and sturdy and were angled upwards towards the rear of the vertebrae. The transverse processes of the first caudal vertebra, when seen from above, had a sigmoid (or S-shaped) profile. The prespinal and postspinal fossae (bony depressions in front and behind the neural spines) were confined to a position above the base of the neural spines. The sides of the first caudal were also deeply hollowed out between the prezygapophyses (articular surfaces of the preceding vertebra) and the diapophyses—processes on the sides for rib articulation—a condition that is not observed in other theropods. Some of the caudal vertebrae also had unusually tall, forwardly-extended prezygapophyses.

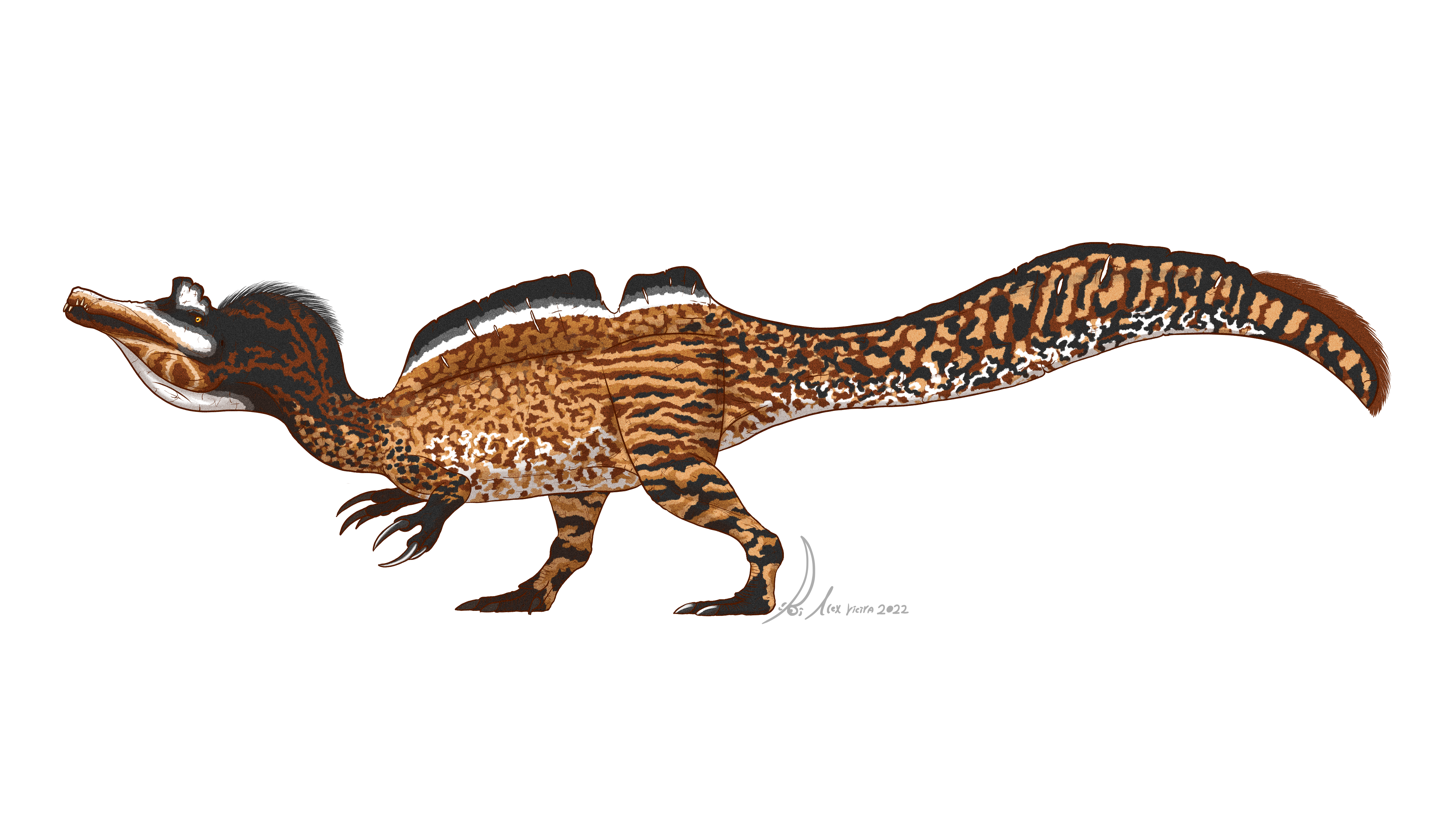
Speculative life restoration, with missing elements such as the head and limbs based on relatives

The 92-centimetre (36 in) long ilium of the pelvis was blade-like, and longer in proportion to the 65-centimetre (26 in) long pubic bone than that of any other known large theropod. The postacetabular ala (rear expansion) was much longer than the preacetabular ala (front expansion), which had a shelf on its central surface that formed the middle edge of the preacetabular fossa. Viewed distally (towards the centre of attachment), the lower end of the pubis had an L-shape resembling that of Baryonyx. The pubic apron—the expanded lower end of the pubis—had a large pubic foramen. On the hind rim of the pubic bone, two openings—the obturator foramen and a lower fenestra (opening)—were open and notch-like. The ischium was 49.6 cm (19.5 in) long, making it shorter in relation to the pubis than in all other known tetanuran theropods. The ischium's main body was large and extensive—atypical of the Y-shaped upper ischia of other tetanurans—and bore an oval-shaped obturator foramen in its side. The shaft of the ischium was flattened sideways, and had an unexpanded ischiadic apron, as in Monolophosaurus and Sinraptor. The ischium attached to the ilium via a peg-and-socket-like articulation, unlike the flat, concave condition seen in Baryonyx. This feature was also present in Vallibonavenatrix.

== Classification ==
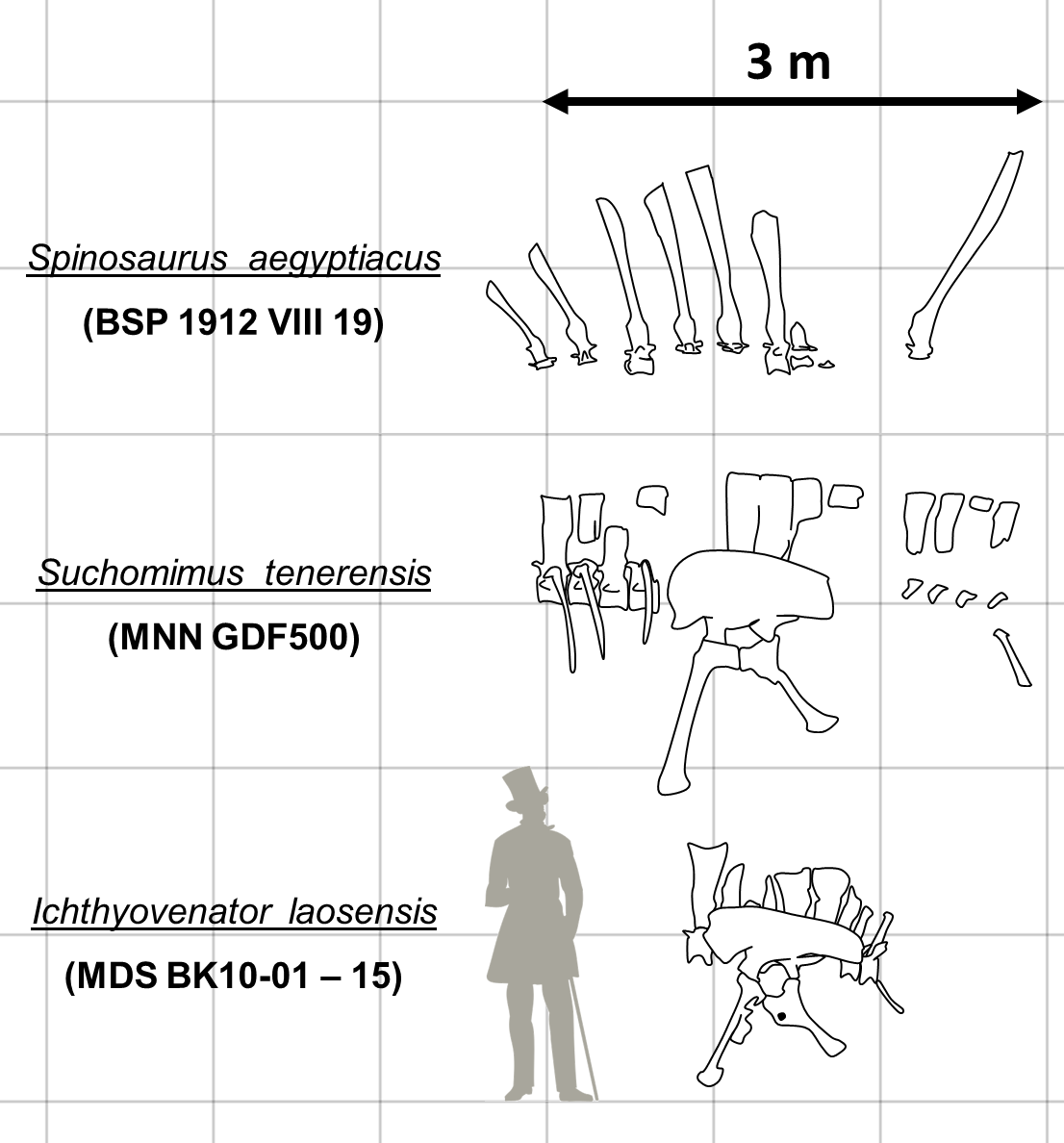
Comparison of the pelvic region and neural spine sails of Suchomimus, Spinosaurus, and Ichthyovenator

In 2012, Ichthyovenator's describers established the unique derived traits of the genus: its dorsal and sacral sinusoidal sail; the thirteenth dorsal neural spine being 410% the length of the centrum, and its distinct, finger-shaped process on its front upper corner; the broad, expanded tips of the third and fourth sacral spines; the first caudal vertebra's deep prezygapophyseal and centrodiapophyseal fossae and S-shaped transverse processes in top view; and the higher ratio of length between the ilium and the accompanying pubis than in any other known theropod. Allain and colleagues also identified some anatomical features that are unique among other known tetanuran theropods, including the rearmost dorsal ribs articulating with the sternal complex, the pubis's main body having obturator and pubic openings, and the ischium having a foramen on its upper end and a shaft that was flattened sideways. The shrinkage of the pubis and ischium relative to the pelvis has been observed in basal coelurosaurs and allosauroids, which the describers attributed to mosaic evolution: the evolution of certain anatomical traits at different times in separate species.

Allain and his team considered Ichthyovenator as representing the first unequivocal spinosaurid from Asia. Though prior spinosaurids had been named from the continent—including Siamosaurus from Thailand's Barremian Sao Khua Formation and "Sinopliosaurus" fusuiensis from China's Aptian Xinlong Formation—the authors noted that palaeontologists have debated the validity of these taxa because they are only confidently known from isolated teeth. Brazilian palaeontologists Marcos Sales and Caesar Schultz have suggested these teeth may eventually be attributed to spinosaurids similar to Ichthyovenator. In addition to tooth fossils, a spinosaurid skeleton that possibly belongs to Siamosaurus was excavated from the Thai Khok Kruat Formation in 2004 and was identified as a definite spinosaur in a 2007 conference abstract by Angela Milner and colleagues, nine years prior to Ichthyovenator's description.

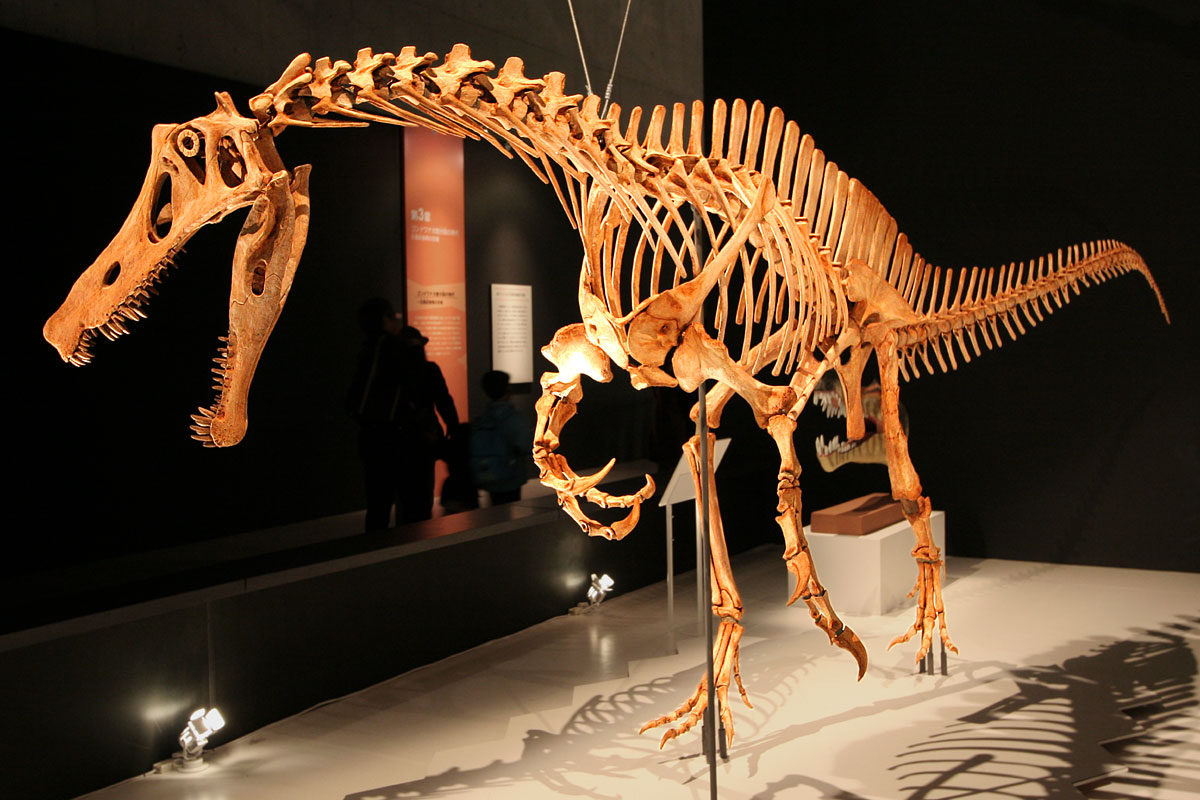
Reconstructed skeleton of the spinosaurine Irritator, mounted at the National Museum of Nature and Science, Tokyo

In 2012, Allain and colleagues assigned Ichthyovenator to the Spinosauridae; more precisely to the subfamily Baryonychinae in a basal position as the sister taxon of a clade formed by Baryonyx and Suchomimus. In Allain's 2014 abstract, he found Ichthyovenator instead as belonging to the Spinosaurinae, due to the lack of serrations on its teeth and the similarities of its vertebrae to those of Sigilmassasaurus. In a 2015 phylogenetic analysis by Evers and colleagues, they suggested the apparent presence of both baryonychine and spinosaurine characteristics in Ichthyovenator means the distinction between the two subfamilies may not be as clear as previously thought. In 2017, American palaeontologist Mickey Mortimer informally hypothesized Ichthyovenator may have been a sail-backed carcharodontosaurid dinosaur closely related to Concavenator, rather than a spinosaurid. Mortimer considered Ichthyovenator as incertae sedis (of uncertain taxonomic affinity) within the clade Orionides, pending description of the new material, which he states will likely confirm Ichthyovenator's spinosaurid identity; however, he no longer has this identification on his website. A 2017 analysis by Sales and Schultz questioned Baryonychinae's validity, citing the morphology of Brazilian spinosaurids Irritator and Angaturama, and suggesting they may have been transitionary forms between the earlier baryonychines and the later spinosaurines. The authors said with further research, Baryonychinae may be found to be a paraphyletic (unnatural) grouping. Ichthyovenator's spinosaurine classification was supported by Thomas Arden and colleagues in 2019, who resolved it as a basal member of the group due to its tall dorsal sail. Their cladogram can be seen below:

- Spinosauridae
  - Praia das Aguncheiras taxon
  - Baryonychinae
    - Baryonyx walkeri
    - Suchomimus tenerensis
  - Spinosaurinae
    - Siamosaurus suteethorni
    - - Eumeralla taxon
      - - Ichthyovenator laosensis
        - - Irritator challengeri
          - Oxalaia quilombensis
          - Spinosaurini
            - Gara Samani taxon
            - Sigilmassasaurus brevicollis
            - Spinosaurus aegyptiacus

== Palaeobiology ==
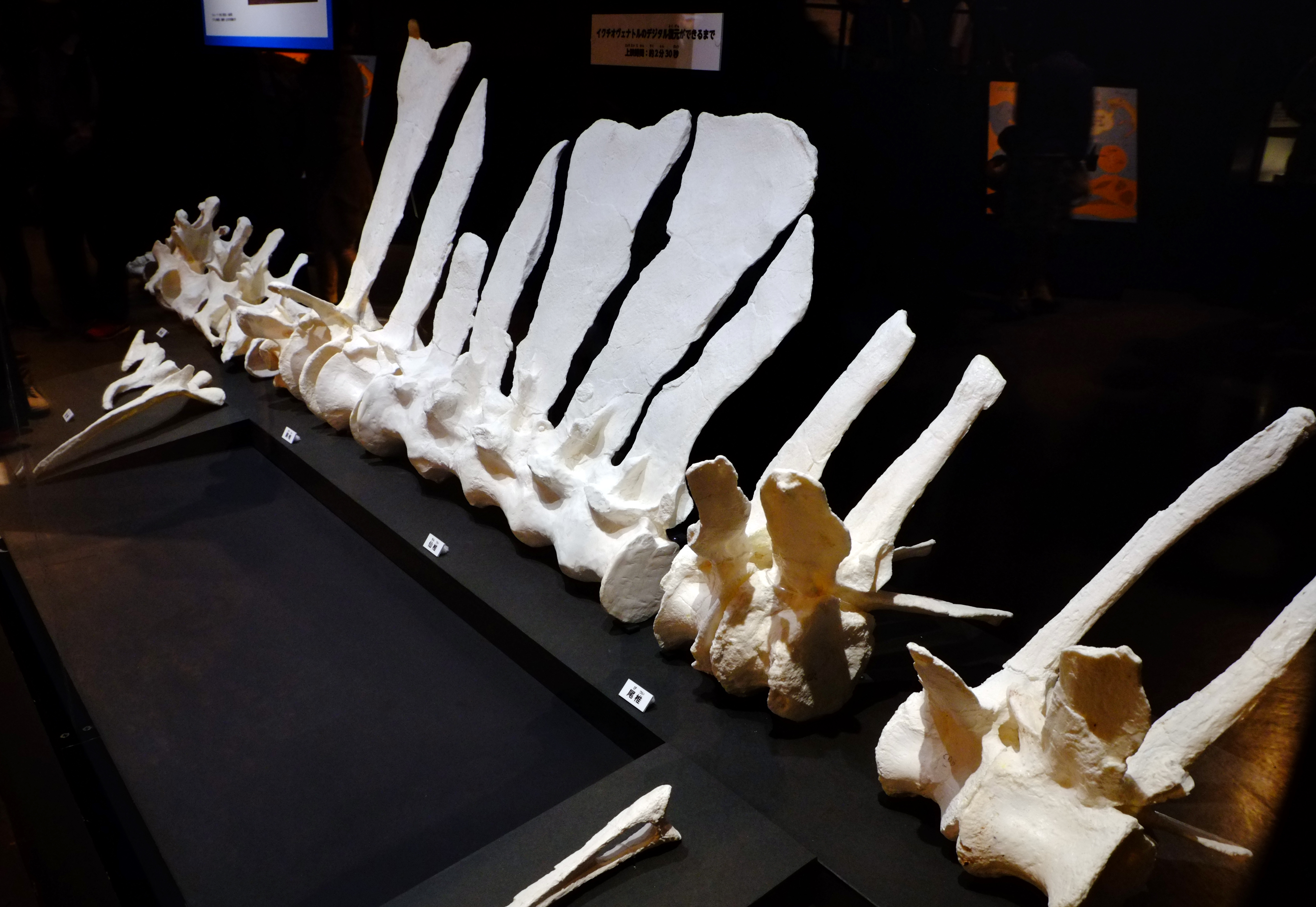
Casts of the vertebrae seen from behind

Though no skull remains have been found for Ichthyovenator, all known spinosaurids had elongated, low, narrow snouts that allowed them to reach far for food and to quickly close their jaws in a manner similar to modern crocodilians. The tips of spinosaurids' upper and lower jaws fanned out into a rosette-like shape that bore long teeth, behind which there was a notch in the upper jaw; this formed a natural trap for prey. Like those of other spinosaurids, Ichthyovenator's straight, unserrated teeth would have been suitable for impaling and capturing small animals and aquatic prey. This type of jaw and tooth morphology, which is also observed in today's gharials and other fish-eating predators, has led many palaeontologists to believe spinosaurids were largely piscivorous (as implied by Ichthyovenator's name). This is also evidenced by the discovery of Scheenstia fish scales in the stomach cavity of one Baryonyx skeleton and a Spinosaurus snout that was found with a vertebra from the sclerorynchid fish Onchopristis embedded in it. A more generalist diet has also been proposed for spinosaurs, based on fossils such as the bones of a juvenile iguanodontid that was also found in the same Baryonyx specimen, an "Irritator" tooth embedded in the vertebrae of a pterosaur, and tooth crowns from Siamosaurus that were found in association with sauropod dinosaur bones. It is thus likely that spinosaurids were also scavengers or hunters of larger prey. Though no limb bones are known from Ichthyovenator, all known spinosaurids had well-built arms with enlarged thumb claws, which they likely used to hunt and process prey.

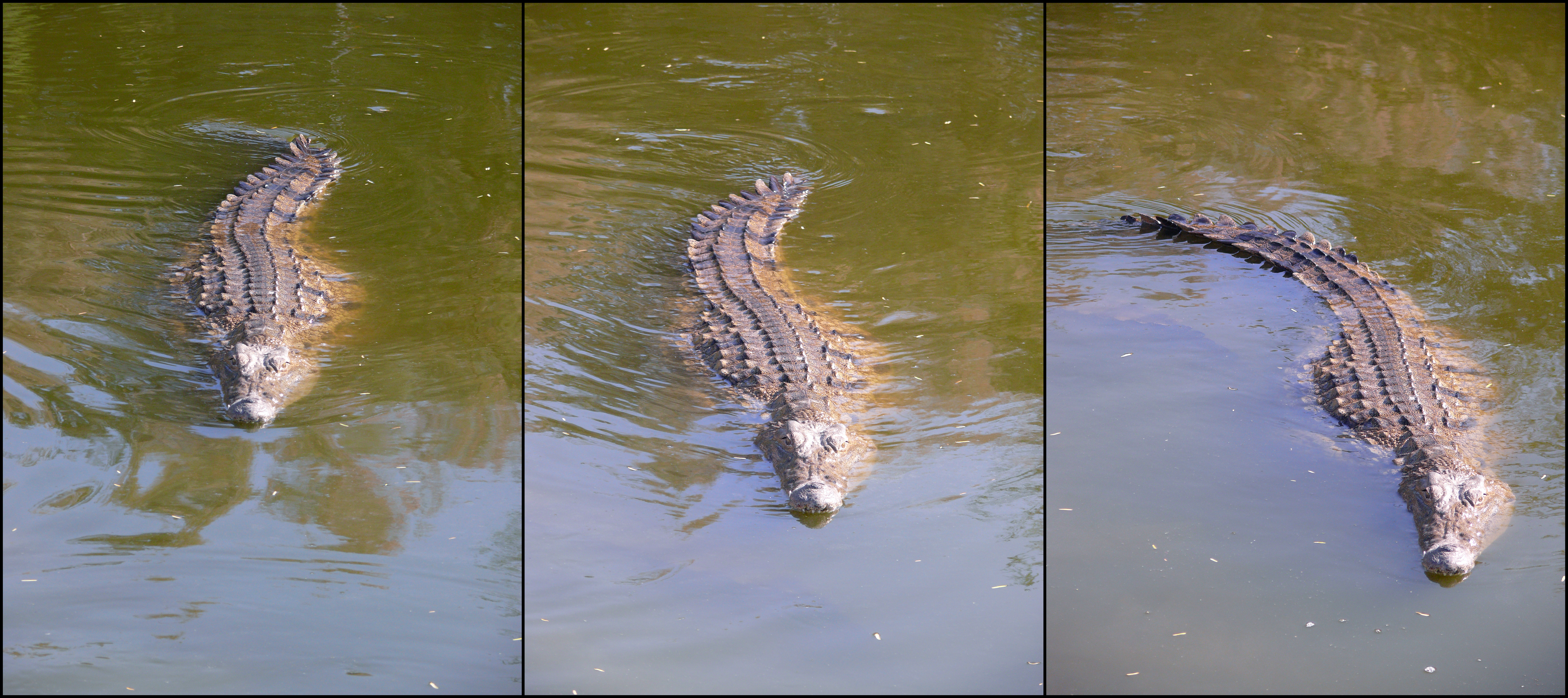
Ichthyovenator might have used its tail, which had elongated neural spines, for propulsion through water, similar to crocodilians such as this Nile crocodile

Many possible functions, including thermoregulation and energy storage, have been proposed for spinosaurid sails. In 2012, Allain and colleagues suggested considering the high diversity in neural spine elongation observed in theropod dinosaurs, as well as histological research done on the sails of synapsids (stem mammals), Ichthyovenator's sinusoidal sail may have been used for courtship display or for recognising members of its own species. In a 2013 blog post, Darren Naish considered the latter function unlikely, favouring the hypothesis of sexual selection for Ichthyovenator's sail because it appears to have evolved on its own, without very close relatives. Naish also notes that it is possible similar relatives have not yet been discovered.

Spinosaurids appear to have had semiaquatic lifestyles, spending much of their time near or in water, which has been inferred by the high density of their limb bones that would have made them less buoyant, and the oxygen isotope ratios of their teeth being closer to those of remains from aquatic animals like turtles, crocodilians, and hippopotamuses than those of other, more terrestrial theropods. Semiaquatic adaptations seem to have been more developed in spinosaurines than baryonychines. Arden and colleagues in 2019 suggested the shortness of Ichthyovenator's pubis and ischium relative to its ilium, coupled with the elongation of the neural spines in the tails of early spinosaurines, are indications that spinosaurids may have progressively made more use of their tails to propel themselves underwater as they grew more adapted to an aquatic lifestyle. A similar, though more extreme, shrinkage of the pelvic girdle and elongation of the tail's neural spines, creating a paddle-like structure, was observed in Spinosaurus, which appears to have been more aquatic than any other known non-avian (or non-bird) dinosaur.

== Palaeoecology and palaeobiogeography ==
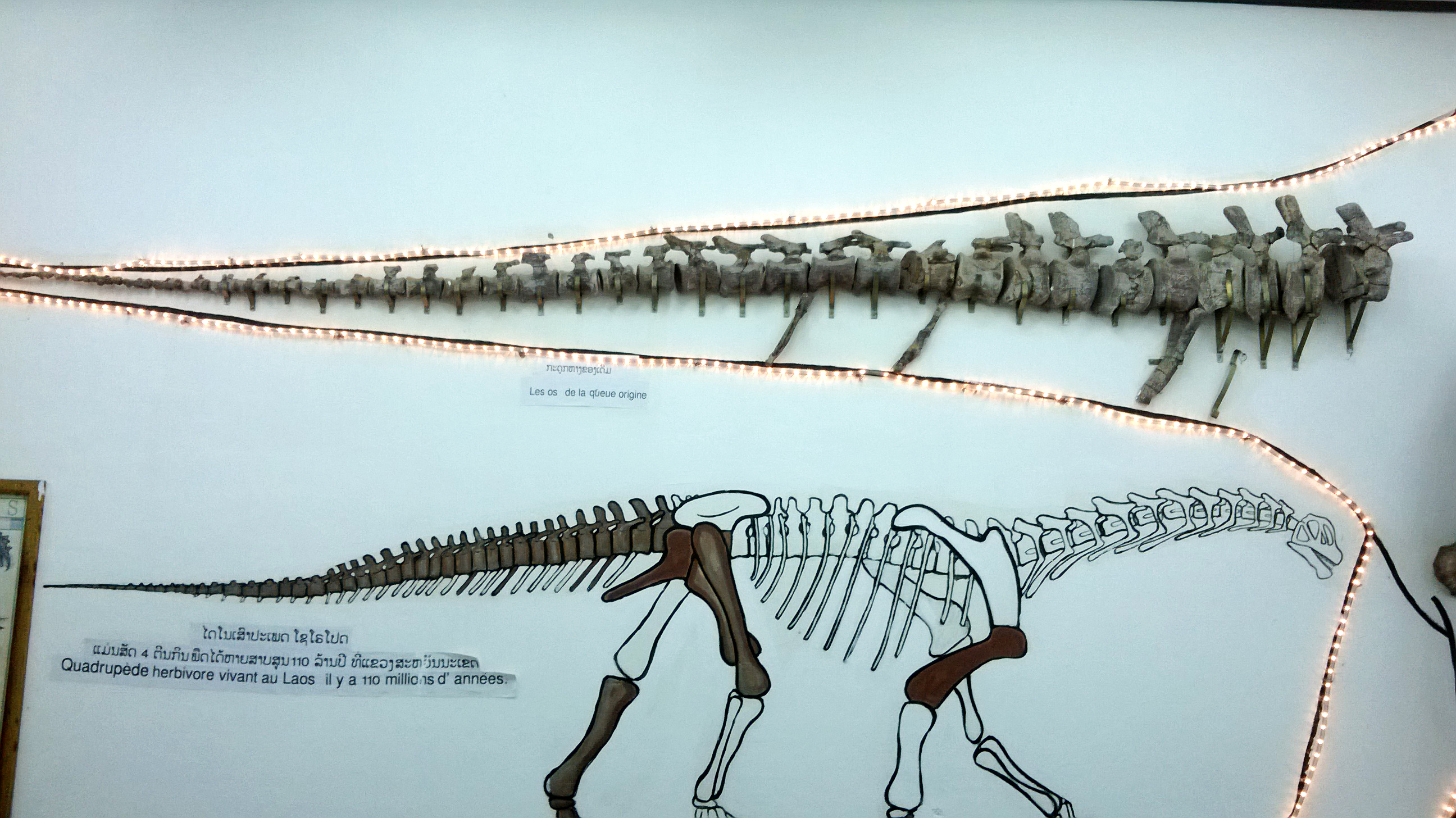
Fossils of the sauropod Tangvayosaurus, another dinosaur from the Gres superieurs Formation, Savannakhet Dinosaur Museum

Ichthyovenator is known from the Barremian to Cenomanian Grès supérieurs Formation, and was found in a layer probably dating to the Aptian stage of the Early Cretaceous period between 120 and 113 million years ago. It coexisted with other dinosaurs such as the sauropod Tangvayosaurus, and an indeterminate sauropod, iguanodontian, and neoceratopsian. Tracks of theropod, sauropod and ornithopod dinosaurs, as well as plant remains, are also known from the formation. Fossils of non-dinosaurian fauna are represented by ray-finned fish like Lanxangichthys and Lepidotes, as well as turtles including Shachemys, Xinjiangchelys, and an indeterminate carettochelyid and trionychid. The trigoniid bivalves Trigonioides and Plicatounio have also been recovered from the formation. The Grès supérieurs Formation is the lateral equivalent of the neighbouring Khok Kruat and Phu Phan Formations in Thailand; from the Khok Kruat formation, fossils of theropods (including spinosaurids), sauropods, iguanodontians, and freshwater fish have also been recovered.

In 2010, Stephen L. Brusatte and colleagues noted the discovery of spinosaurids in Asia, a family previously known only from Europe, Africa, and South America, suggests there was faunal interchange between the supercontinents Laurasia in the north and Gondwana in the south during the early Late Cretaceous. It may also be possible spinosaurids already had a cosmopolitan distribution before the Middle Cretaceous preceding the breakup of Laurasia from Gondwana, but the authors noted more evidence is needed to test this hypothesis. In 2012, Allain and colleagues suggested such a global distribution may have occurred earlier across Pangaea before the Late Jurassic, even if Asia was the first landmass to be separated during the breakup of the supercontinent. In 2020, Elisabete Malafaia and colleagues also indicated a complex biogeographical pattern for spinosaurs during the Early Cretaceous based on anatomical similarities between Ichthyovenator and the European genus Vallibonavenatrix.
