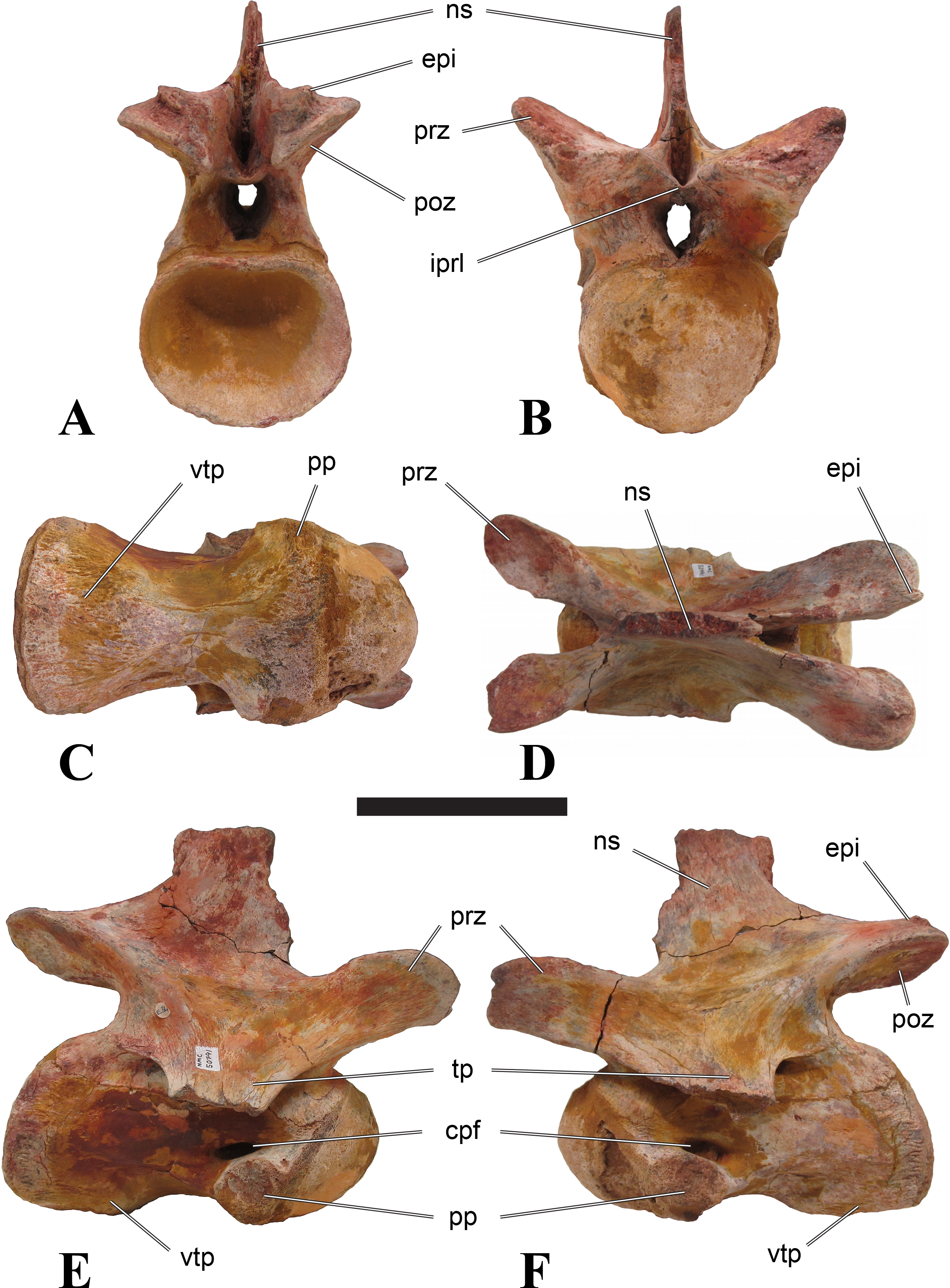
- Middle neck vertebra, specimen CMN 50791 (the holotype of Spinosaurus maroccanus)

Scientific classification
- Kingdom: Animalia
- Phylum: Chordata
- Class: Reptilia
- Clade: Dinosauria
- Clade: Saurischia
- Clade: Theropoda
- Family: †Spinosauridae
- Subfamily: †Spinosaurinae
- Tribe: †Spinosaurini
- Genus: †Sigilmassasaurus; Russell, 1996
- Species: †S. brevicollis

Binomial name
- †Sigilmassasaurus brevicollis Russell, 1996

Synonyms
- ?Spinosaurus maroccanus Russell, 1996

= Sigilmassasaurus =

Sigilmassasaurus Temporal range: Cenomanian ~99–94 Ma

Controversial extinct genus of dinosaur

Sigilmassasaurus (/siːdʒɪlˌmɑːsəˈsɔːrəs/ see-jil-MAH-sə-SOR-əs; "Sijilmassa lizard") is a controversial genus of spinosaurid dinosaur that lived approximately 100 to 94 million years ago during the Late Cretaceous Period in what is now northern Africa. Named in 1996 by Canadian paleontologist Dale Russell, it contains a single species, Sigilmassasaurus brevicollis. The identity of the genus has been debated by scientists, with some considering its fossils to represent material from the closely related species Spinosaurus aegyptiacus, while others have classified it as a separate taxon, forming the clade Spinosaurini with Spinosaurus as its sister taxon.

Sigilmassasaurus was a moderately-built, ground-dwelling, bipedal carnivore, like most other theropods. It may have had strong neck musculature as evidenced by the morphology of its vertebrae (backbones). Sigilmassasaurus may have had semiaquatic habits and a partially piscivorous diet. It coexisted with other large theropods in the Kem Kem Group.

== History of research ==
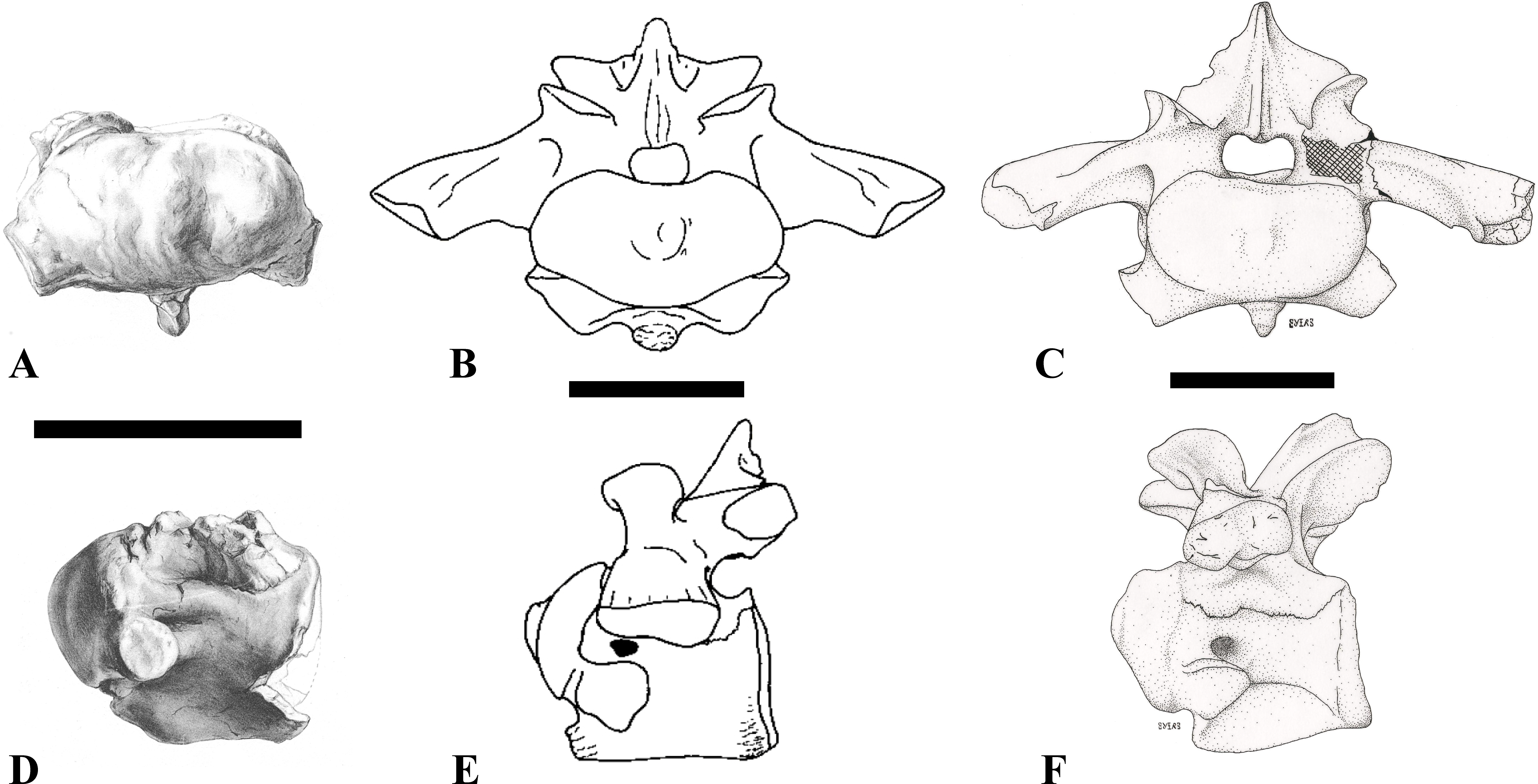
Drawings comparing "Spinosaurus B" and Sigilmassasaurus

Fossils of Sigilmassasaurus were recovered at the Kem Kem Formation in the Tafilalt Oasis region of Morocco, near the site of the ancient city of Sijilmassa, for which it was named. Canadian paleontologist Dale Russell named Sigilmassasaurus in 1996, from the ancient city and the Greek word sauros ("lizard"). A single species was named, S. brevicollis, which is derived from the Latin brevis ("short") and collum ("neck"), because the neck vertebrae are very short from front to back. Sigilmassasaurus comes from red sandstone sediments in southern Morocco, which are known by various names, including the Grès rouges infracénomaniens, Continental Red Beds, and lower Kem Kem Beds. The rocks date back to the Cenomanian, the earliest stage of the Late Cretaceous Period, approximately 100 to 94 million years ago.

The holotype, or original specimen, of S. brevicollis, CMN 41857, is a single posterior neck vertebra, although Russell referred fifteen other vertebrae found in the same formation to the species. Other material had been found in Egypt, and was referred to by German paleontologist Ernst Stromer as "Spinosaurus B". Russell in 1996 considered the Egyptian specimen, IPHG 1922 X45, to belong to Sigilmassasaurus or a closely related animal, naming it as a Sigilmassasaurus sp. A second Sigilmassasaurus sp. was named by Russel based on specimen CMN 41629, an anterior dorsal vertebra. "Spinosaurus B" would be intermediate in build between this latter Sigilmassasaurus sp. and S. brevicollis. Russell created the family Sigilmassasauridae for these animals. The neck vertebrae of these dinosaurs are wider from side to side, about 50%, than they are long from front to back. Whether the neck as a whole was particularly short, is unknown: the holotype vertebra is a cervicodorsal, from the transition between the neck and the back, which would not be long anyway. The exact position of Sigilmassasaurus within the theropod family tree is unknown, but it belongs somewhere inside the theropod subgroup known as Tetanurae and most likely was a member of the family Spinosauridae.

Two distal caudal vertebra (specimens UFMA 1.10.229 and UFMA 1.10.240) discovered in the Alcantara Formation of Brazil were assigned to Sigilmassasaurus in 2002. However, the 2022 study noted that these specimens are indeterminate spinosaurids, most likely belonging to Oxalaia considering the geographical and geological context. The 2016 study assigned an isolated quadrate (specimen MHNM.KK376) to Sigilmassasaurus brevicollis due to its difference from other specimens assigned to Spinosaurus aegyptiacus, though this was rejected by the 2020 study which noted that these differences in morphology are indicative of variation in skull morphology within a single species. The 2019 study assigned a juvenile specimen FSAC-KK-18122 to Sigilmassasaurus brevicollis based on its identical proportion to BSPG 2011 I 115 which was assigned to the taxon in a 2015 study, but this referral was rejected in a 2020 study based on the fact that the median tubercle and median suture is present in BSPG 2011 I 115 but absent in FSAC-KK-18122, so the presence or absence of such feature should not be used to taxonomically separate isolated spinosaurid remains. In 2024, a complete posterior cervical vertebra (specimen NHMUK PV R 38358) was assigned to Sigilmassasaurus brevicollis.

=== Disputed validity ===
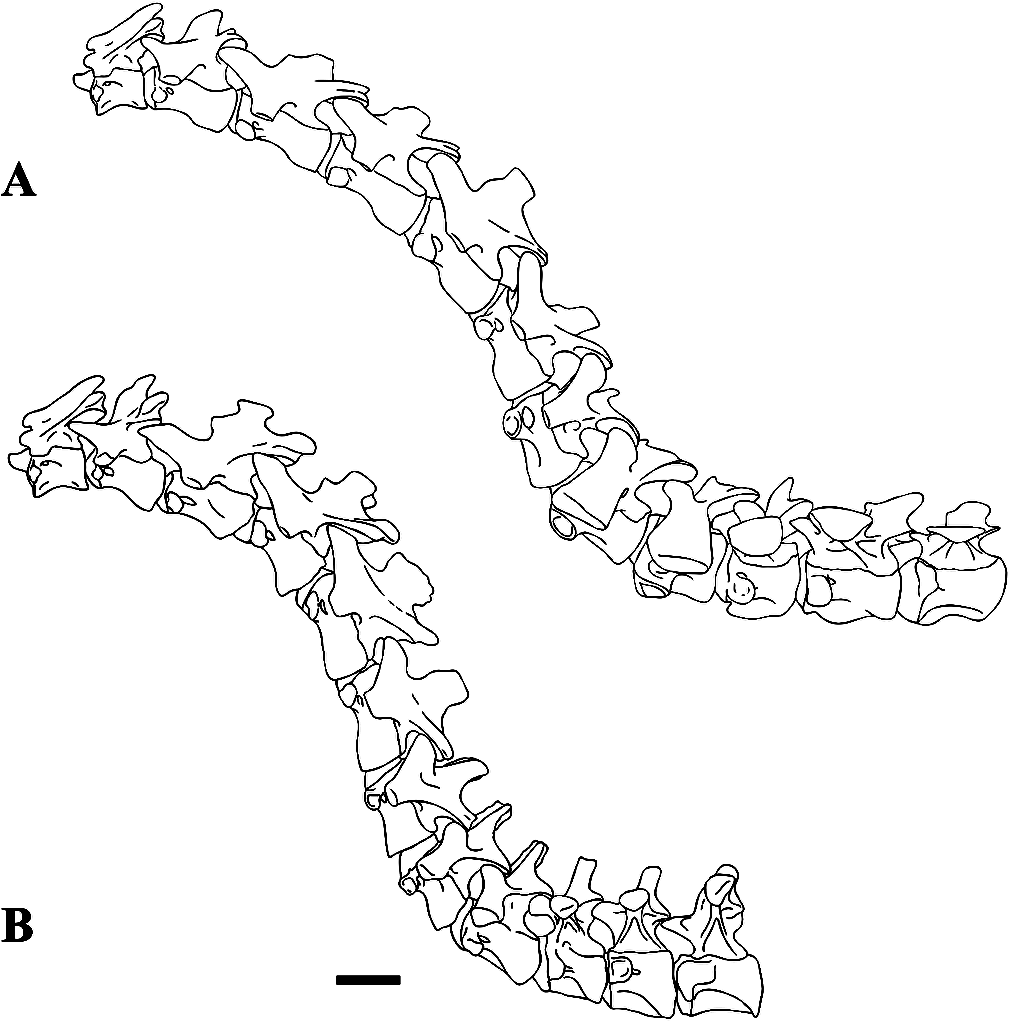
Neck reconstructions of Sigilmassasaurus (top) and Baryonyx

The validity of Sigilmassaurus, however, did not go unchallenged shortly after it was named. In 1996, Paul Sereno and colleagues described a Carcharodontosaurus skull (SGM-Din-1) from Morocco, as well as a neck vertebrae (SGM-Din-3) which resembled that of "Spinosaurus B," which they therefore synonymized with Carcharodontosaurus. A 1998 study went further, calling Sigilmassasaurus itself a junior synonym of Carcharodontosaurus.

In 2005, however, Argentine paleontologist Fernando Novas and colleagues found that SGM-Din-3, which was used to synonymize Carcharodontosaurus and "Spinosaurus B", was not actually associated with SGM-Din-1, the Carcharodontosaurus skull described in 1996, and shows clear differences with the holotype of Carcharodontosaurus. Other features of "Spinosaurus B" also differed from Carcharodontosaurus, lending support to the notion that it (and therefore Sigilmassasaurus) is a separate taxon. The same study claimed that the tail vertebrae by Russell assigned to the species were in fact those of iguanodonts. A study in 2013 by Bradley McFeeters and colleagues considered Sigilmassasaurus as valid and an indeterminate member of the Tetanurae.

In 2014, German-Moroccan paleontologist Nizar Ibrahim and colleagues referred the specimens of Sigilmassasaurus to Spinosaurus aegyptiacus, together with "Spinosaurus B" and created a neotype for S. aegyptiacus. Spinosaurus maroccanus was considered a nomen dubium following the conclusions of previous papers. In a 2015 re-description of Sigilmassasaurus by Serjoscha Evers and his team, it was considered a valid genus within the Spinosauridae. The authors also proposed Spinosaurus maroccanus as a junior synonym of Sigilmassasaurus, and rejected the proposal of a Spinosaurus aegyptiacus neotype.

A study by British paleontologist Thomas Arden and colleagues in 2018 concluded that Sigilmassasaurus was a valid genus and formed a tribe with Spinosaurus termed Spinosaurini. The largest specimen of Spinosaurus cf. aegyptiacus, MSNM V4047, was tentatively assigned to Sigilmassasaurus brevicollis. On the basis of vertebrae, the researchers suggested that Sigilmassasaurus may have grown larger than Spinosaurus. Although in the absence of associated material, it is difficult to be certain what material belongs to which genus. Below is a cladogram based on the analysis by Arden and colleagues:

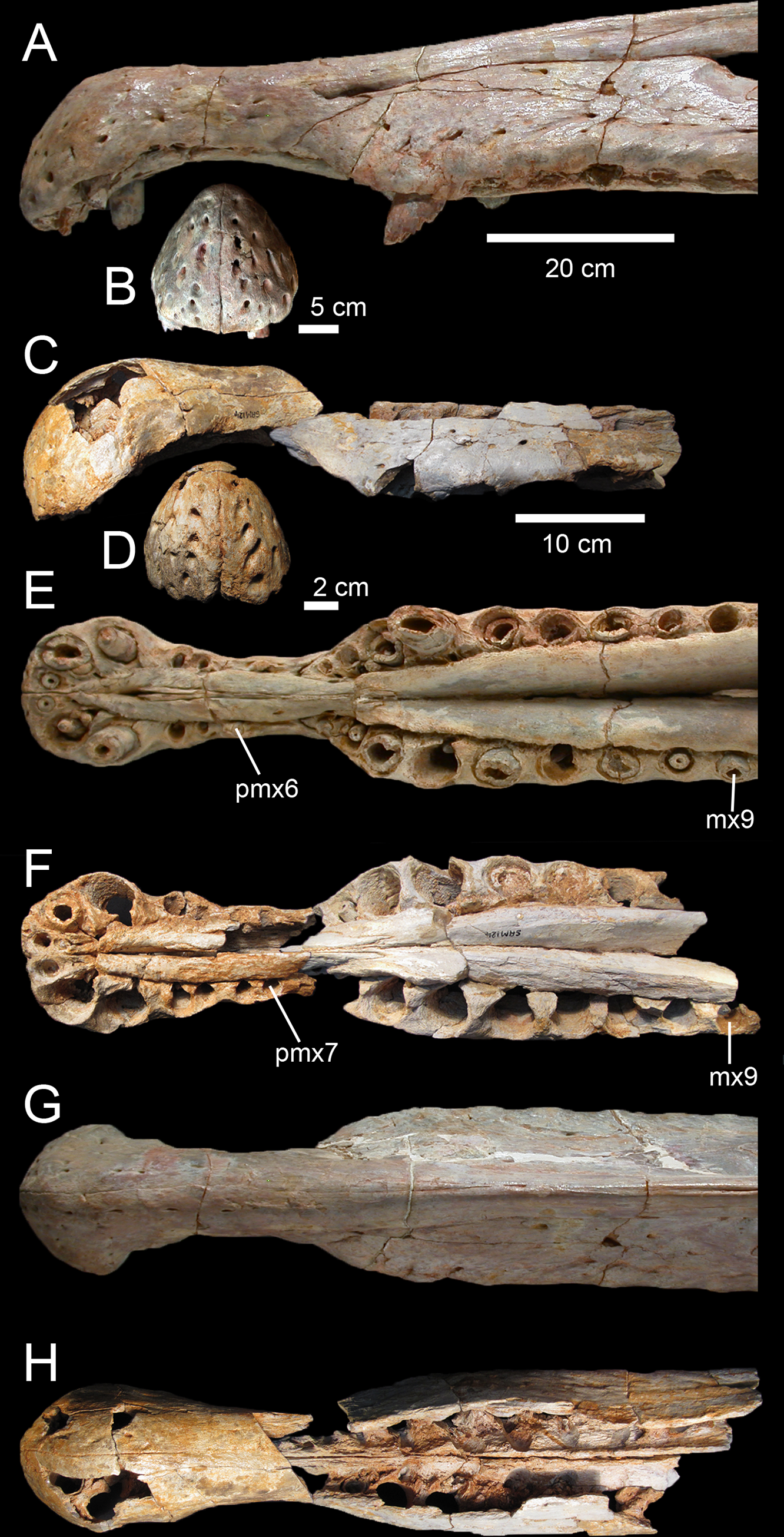
Comparison between the spinosaurine snouts MNSM V4047 and MNHN SAM 124, which have been assigned to either Spinosaurus or Sigilmassasaurus

- Spinosauridae
  - Praia das Aguncheiras taxon
  - Baryonychinae
    - Baryonyx walkeri
    - Suchomimus tenerensis
  - Spinosaurinae
    - Siamosaurus suteethorni
    - - Eumeralla taxon
      - - Ichthyovenator laosensis
        - - Irritator challengeri
          - Oxalaia quilombensis
          - Spinosaurini
            - Gara Samani taxon
            - Sigilmassasaurus brevicollis
            - Spinosaurus aegyptiacus

A 2020 study by British paleontologist Symth and colleagues suggested that Sigilmassasaurus is synonymous with Spinosaurus and the Brazilian spinosaurine genus Oxalaia, with both genera falling into the Spinosaurus hypodigm. The putative characters supporting Sigilmassasaurus's distinction as a valid genus were discussed and found to be invalid. If supported by future research, both Sigilmassasaurus and Oxalaia would be rendered junior synonyms of Spinosaurus and expand its range, which would further support the theory of faunal interchanges between Africa and South America during the Cretaceous.

A 2021 study conducted by Bradley McFeeters of Carleton University shed further light for the controversial existence of a second spinosaurid within northern Africa. The study concluded that, although limited, the new data could lend support to the controversial hypothesis that two spinosaurid taxa are represented in the Kem Kem Group. The study focused on an unusual mid-cervical vertebra belonging to a large spinosaurid from the Cenomanian Kem Kem Group of Morocco. It was compared to the characteristic morphology of each reconstructed cervical position in Spinosaurus aegyptiacus, based on a recent composite reconstruction that incorporates most previously referred material from this unit. Rather than conforming to any of the previously identified cervical positions in its morphology, the specimen displays a unique combination of mid-cervical characters, with the relatively compact centrum suggesting a position as C4, and the form of the neural arch laminae suggesting a position as C5 or C6. Furthermore, the vertebra displays two characters that are previously unknown in spinosaurid mid-cervicals from the Kem Kem Group: a rounded tuberosity present on the hypapophysis (a projection from the bottom of the vertebra) that is not continuous with a ventral keel, and a moderately developed, dorsally oriented epipophysis (a bump located on the postzygapophysis) that does not overhang the postzygapophysis posteriorly. This revelation leads to the diagnostic value of positionally variable cervical vertebral characters in spinosaurid systematics is discussed. However, according to the authors, the vertebrae could also show that there was more variation in the neck of Spinosaurus and the authors cautioned that more material is necessary to draw a conclusion.

== Paleobiology ==
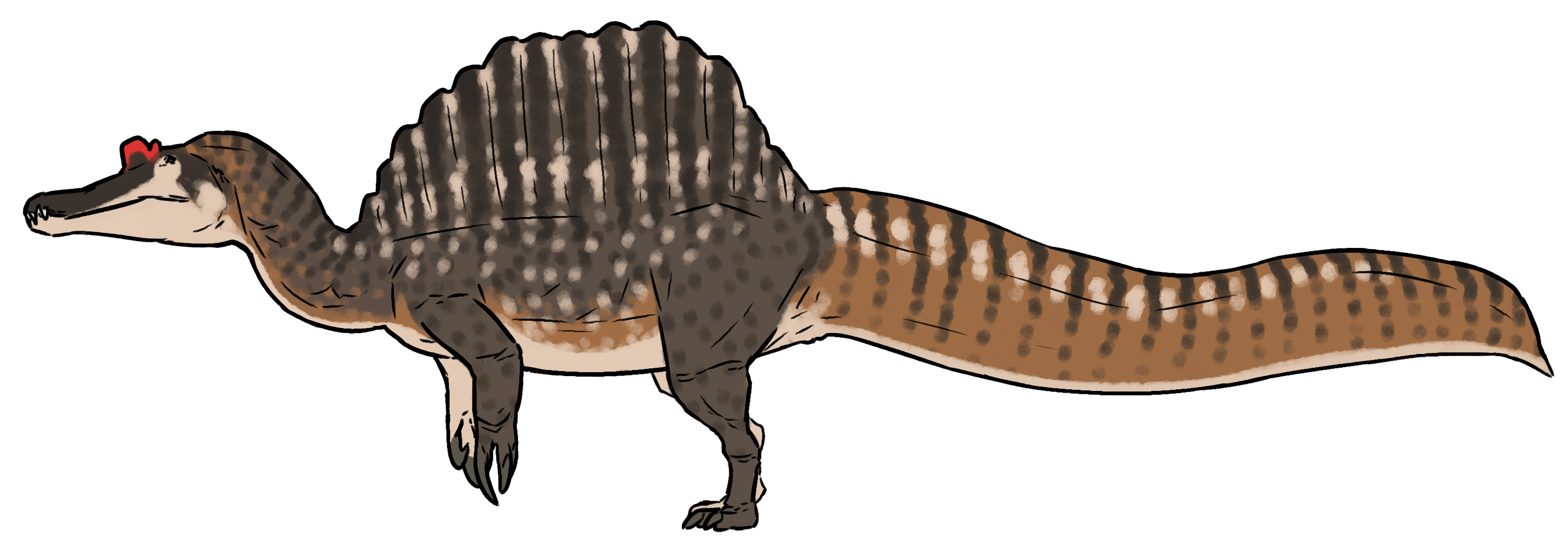
Speculative life restoration based on specimens also assigned to Spinosaurus

On the bottoms of its cervical vertebrae, Sigilmassasaurus bore a series of highly rugged bony structures. These were suggested by Evers and colleagues as being possible evidence for substantial neck musculature, since the attachment sites of muscles and ligaments are often indicated by scarring on the bone surface. The neck muscles inferred from Sigilmassasaurus in particular would have enabled it to rapidly snatch fish out of the water, as indicated by the use of similarly placed musculature in modern birds and crocodilians. This has also been proposed for the related genus Irritator, on account of the prominent sagittal crest running towards the back of its head. However, Evers and colleagues noted that a more thorough biomechanical analysis is required for confirmation of this condition in Sigilmassasaurus.

Several large theropods (more than one tonne) are known from the Cenomanian of northern Africa, raising questions about how such animals would have coexisted. Species of Spinosaurus, the longest known theropod, have been found in both Morocco and Egypt, as has the huge Carcharodontosaurus. Two other theropods, Deltadromeus and Bahariasaurus, have also been found in Morocco and Egypt, respectively, and may be closely related or possibly the same genus. Sigilmassasaurus, from Morocco, and "Spinosaurus B", from Egypt, represent a fourth type of large predator. This situation resembles that in the Late Jurassic Morrison Formation of North America, which boasts up to five theropod genera over one tonne in weight, as well as several smaller genera. Differences in head shape and body size among the large North African theropods may have been enough to allow niche partitioning as seen among the many different predator species found today in the African savanna.

== See also ==
- Spinosauridae
