= Alcântara Formation =

Brazilian geological formation

- Stratigraphic range: Cenomanian
- Type: Geological formation
- Unit of: Itapecuru Group
- Underlies: Cujupe Formation
- Overlies: Undifferentiated unit
- Thickness: 30–35 m (98–115 ft)

Lithology
- Primary: Sandstone
- Other: Claystone, conglomerate

Location
- Coordinates: 2.5°S 44.5°W
- Approximate paleocoordinates: 9.4°S 19.3°W
- Region: Maranhão
- Country: Brazil
- Extent: São Luís-Grajaú Basin

Type section
- Named for: Alcântara (city)
- Named by: Rossetti & Truckenbrodt
- Year defined: 1997
- Alcântara Formation (Brazil)

The Alcântara Formation is a geological formation in northeastern Brazil whose strata date back to the Cenomanian of the Late Cretaceous.

== Fossil content ==
Color key: Taxon / Reclassified taxon / Taxon falsely reported as present / Dubious taxon or junior synonym / Ichnotaxon / Ootaxon / Morphotaxon	Notes; Uncertain or tentative taxa are in small text; ~~crossed out~~ taxa are discredited.

=== Dinosaurs ===
==== Ornithischians ====
Ornithischians of the Alcântara Formation
Genus	Species	Location	Stratigraphic position	Material	Notes	Image
Ornithopoda indet.	Indeterminate	Laje do Coringa, Cajual Island		Footprints	Footprints interpreted as coming from both small and large ornithopods. Larger footprints have been tentatively assigned to hadrosaurs.	

==== Sauropods ====
Sauropods of the Alcântara Formation
Genus	Species	Location	Stratigraphic position	Material	Notes	Images
Itapeuasaurus	I. cajapioensis	Itapeua beach			A rebbachisaurine rebbachisaurid	
cf. Limaysaurus	L. tessonei	Laje do Coringa, Cajual Island		Vertebrae	A limaysaurine rebbachisaurid	
cf. Malawisaurus?	M. sp.	Laje do Coringa, Cajual Island		Tooth	A tooth similar to Malawisaurus	
Sauropoda indet.	Indeterminate	Laje do Coringa, Cajual Island		Teeth	May belong to a titanosaurian or a diplodocoid rebbachisaurid	
Titanosauria indet.	Indeterminate	Laje do Coringa, Cajual Island		Vertebrae and an osteoderm	A titanosaurian sauropod	

==== Theropods ====
Theropods of the Alcântara Formation
Genus	Species	Location	Stratigraphic position	Material	Notes	Images
Abelisauridae indet.	Indeterminate	Laje do Coringa, Cajual Island		Two shed tooth crowns	A abelisaurid theropod	
Carcharodontosauridae indet.	Indeterminate	Laje do Coringa, Cajual Island		Teeth	A carcharodontosaurid theropod	
Noasaurinae indet.	Indeterminate	Laje do Coringa, Cajual Island		Nine teeth	A noasaurine noasaurid; closely related to Masiakasaurus knopfleri.	
Oxalaia	O. quilombensis	Laje do Coringa, Cajual Island		Fused premaxillae; isolated and incomplete left maxilla (both heavily damaged from the National Museum of Brazil fire)	A spinosaurin spinosaurine which may be synonymus with Spinosaurus itself. However, this has been disputed.	
Sigilmassasaurus	S. brevicollis	Laje do Coringa, Cajual Island		Two caudal vertebrae	Referral to Sigilmassasaurus was based on similarity to presumed caudal vertebrae of the genus from the Kem Kem Group. However, the 2022 study noted that these specimens are indeterminate spinosaurids, most likely belonging to Oxalaia considering the geographical and geological context.	
Spinosaurini indet.	Indeterminate	Laje do Coringa, Cajual Island		Teeth	A spinosaurin spinosaurine different from Oxalaia.	
Unenlagiinae Indet.	Indeterminate	Laje do Coringa, Cajual Island, São Luís-Grajaú Basin		Teeth	A unenlagiine dromaeosaurid	

=== Pterosauria ===
Pterosaurs of the Alcântara Formation
Genus	Species	Location	Stratigraphic position	Material	Notes	Images
Anhangueridae indet.	Indeterminate	Laje do Coringa, Cajual Island		Teeth	A anhanguerid pterosaur	
Ornithocheiroidea Indet.	Indeterminate	Laje do Coringa, Cajual Island		Tooth	A ornithocheiroid pterosaur	

=== Crocodylomorphs ===
Crocodylomorphs of the Alcântara Formation
Genus	Species	Location	Stratigraphic position	Material	Notes	Images
Candidodon	C. itapecuruense	Laje do Coringa, Cajual Island		Teeth	A candidodontid notosuchian	
Coringasuchus	C. anisodontis	Laje do Coringa, Cajual Island		Partial right dentary	A ziphosuchian notosuchian	

=== Turtles ===
Turtles of the Alcântara Formation
Genus	Species	Location	Stratigraphic position	Material	Notes	Images
Pelomedusoides indet.	Indeterminate	Laje do Coringa, Cajual Island		Incomplete carapace	A side-necked turtle	

=== Squamates ===
Squamates of the Alcântara Formation
Genus	Species	Location	Stratigraphic position	Material	Notes	Images
Seismophis	S. septentrionalis	Laje do Coringa, Cajual Island		Vertebrae	A snake	

=== Mosasaurs ===
Mosasaurs of the Alcântara Formation
Genus	Species	Location	Stratigraphic position	Material	Notes	Images
Carinodens	C. fraasi	Laje do Coringa, Cajual Island		Dental	A globidensin mosasaurine	
Mosasauridae Indet.	Indeterminate	Laje do Coringa, Cajual Island			An indeterminate mosasaurid	

=== Plesiosaurs ===
Plesiosaurs of the Alcântara Formation
Genus	Species	Location	Stratigraphic position	Material	Notes	Image
Brachaucheninae Indet.	Indeterminate	Laje do Coringa, Cajual Island		Teeth	A brachauchenine thalassophonean	

=== Fish ===
Fishes of the Alcântara Formation
Genus	Species	Location	Stratigraphic position	Material	Notes	Images
Adrianaichthys	A. pankowski	Laje do Coringa, Cajual Island		Scales	A lepisosteiform fish	
Aegyptobatus	A. kuehnei	Laje de Coringa, Cajual Island			A distobatid hybodont	
Arganodus	A. tiguidiensis	Laje do Coringa, Cajual Island		Dental plates	A arganodontid lungfish	
Atlanticopristis	A. equatorialis	Falésia do Sismito and Laje do Coringa, Cajual Island		Fourteen denticle specimens (two complete)	A sclerorhynchoid	
Bartschichthys	B. sp.	Laje do Coringa, Cajual Island		Spines	A cladistian	
Ceratodus	C. brasiliensis	Laje do Coringa, Cajual Island		Dental plates	A ceratodontid lungfish	
Ceratodus	C. humei	Laje do Coringa, Cajual Island		Dental plates	A ceratodontid lungfish	
Distobatus	D. nutiae	Laje de Coringa, Cajual Island		Teeth	A distobatid hybodont	
Equinoxiodus	E. alcantarensis	Laje do Coringa, Cajual Island		One complete and eight incomplete tooth plates	A neoceatodontid lungfish	
Equinoxiodus	E. schuitzei	Laje do Coringa, Cajual Island		One complete and eight incomplete tooth plates	A neoceatodontid lungfish	
Hybodontidae Indet.	Indeterminate	Laje de Coringa, Cajual Island		Teeth & Cephalic spines	A hybodontid hybodont	
Hylaeobatis	H. sp.	Laje do Coringa, Cajual Island		Tooth	A ptychodontid lamniform	
Lepidotes	L. sp.	Laje do Coringa, Cajual Island		Mineralized scales	A lepidotid fish.	
Lepisosteidae Indet.	Indeterminate	Laje do Coringa, Cajual Island		Scales	A gar	
Lonchidiidae Indet.	Indeterminate	Laje de Coringa, Cajual Island		Teeth & Dorsal Spines	A lonchidiid hybodont	
Mawsonia	M. gigas	Laje do Coringa, Cajual Island		Palato-quadrate and post-parietal cranial material	A mawsoniid coelacanth.	
Myliobatis	M. dixoni	Laje do Coringa, Cajual Island			A myliobatid eagle ray	
Obaichthys	O. africanus	Laje do Coringa, Cajual Island		Scales	A obaichthyid lepisosteiform	
Onchopristis	cf. O. numida	Laje do Coringa, Cajual Island		Rostral teeth	A sclerorhynchoid	
Pycnodontiformes indet.	Indeterminate	Laje do Coringa, Cajual Island		Dental plate and teeth		
Stephanodus	S. sp.	Laje do Coringa, Cajual Island		Pharyngeal teeth	A pycnodontid pycnodont	
Tribodus	T. limae	Laje do Coringa, Cajual Island		Dorsal spines	A hybodont shark	

=== Plants ===
Plants of the Alcântara Formation
Genus	Species	Location	Stratigraphic position	Material	Notes	Image
Araucariaceae Indet.	Indeterminate	Laje do Coringa, Cajual Island		Log	A pine	
Paradoxopteris	P. sanctiluigi	Laje do Coringa, Cajual Island		Stalk fragment	A giant tree fern	
