= Coringasuchus =

Coringasuchus Temporal range: Cenomanian ~99–95 Ma

Scientific classification
- Kingdom: Animalia
- Phylum: Chordata
- Class: Reptilia
- Clade: Pseudosuchia
- Clade: Crocodylomorpha
- Clade: †Notosuchia
- Clade: †Ziphosuchia
- Genus: †Coringasuchus; Kellner et al. 2009

Type species
- †Coringasuchus anisodontis Kellner et al. 2009

Extinct genus of reptiles

Coringasuchus is a genus of mesoeucrocodylian crocodyliform, perhaps a notosuchian. It is known from fossils including cranial material discovered in rocks of the early Cenomanian-age Upper Cretaceous Alcântara Formation, Cajual Island, northeastern Brazil. Coringasuchus was described by Alexander Kellner and colleagues in 2009. The type species is C. anisodontis.
