= Cajual Island =

Coordinates: 2.478°S 44.486°W

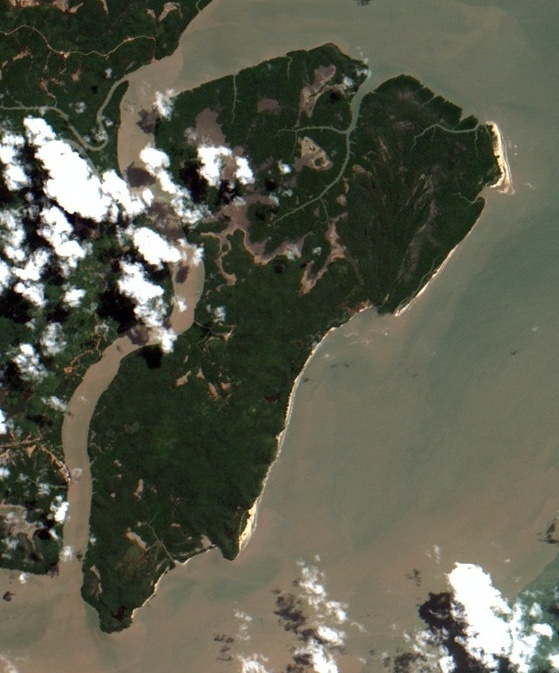
- Satellite image by CBERS-4.
- Interactive map of Cajual Island

Geography
- Location: Baía de São Marcos

Administration
- Brazil
- Municipality: Alcântara
- State: Maranhão

The island of Cajual is located in the Baía de São Marcos near to Alcântara, Maranhão, Brazil.

The island is an important Brazilian paleontological site, where fossils of animals and plants such as conifers and ferns. The finds include the remains of the largest carnivorous dinosaur in Brazil. Traces of the maxillary and nostril of the specimen were found. Known as Oxalaia quilombensis, the species is part of the family of dinosaurs known as Spinosauridae, with elongated skulls and spines along the back.

The presence of fossils also present in Africa proves that the continents were once united, forming Gondwana. The "Lage of the Joker", where the fossils are found, is up to 2 meters below the water at high tide, so it can only be visited for only a few hours a day.

Currently, the island of Cajual is home to a small community of quilombolas.
