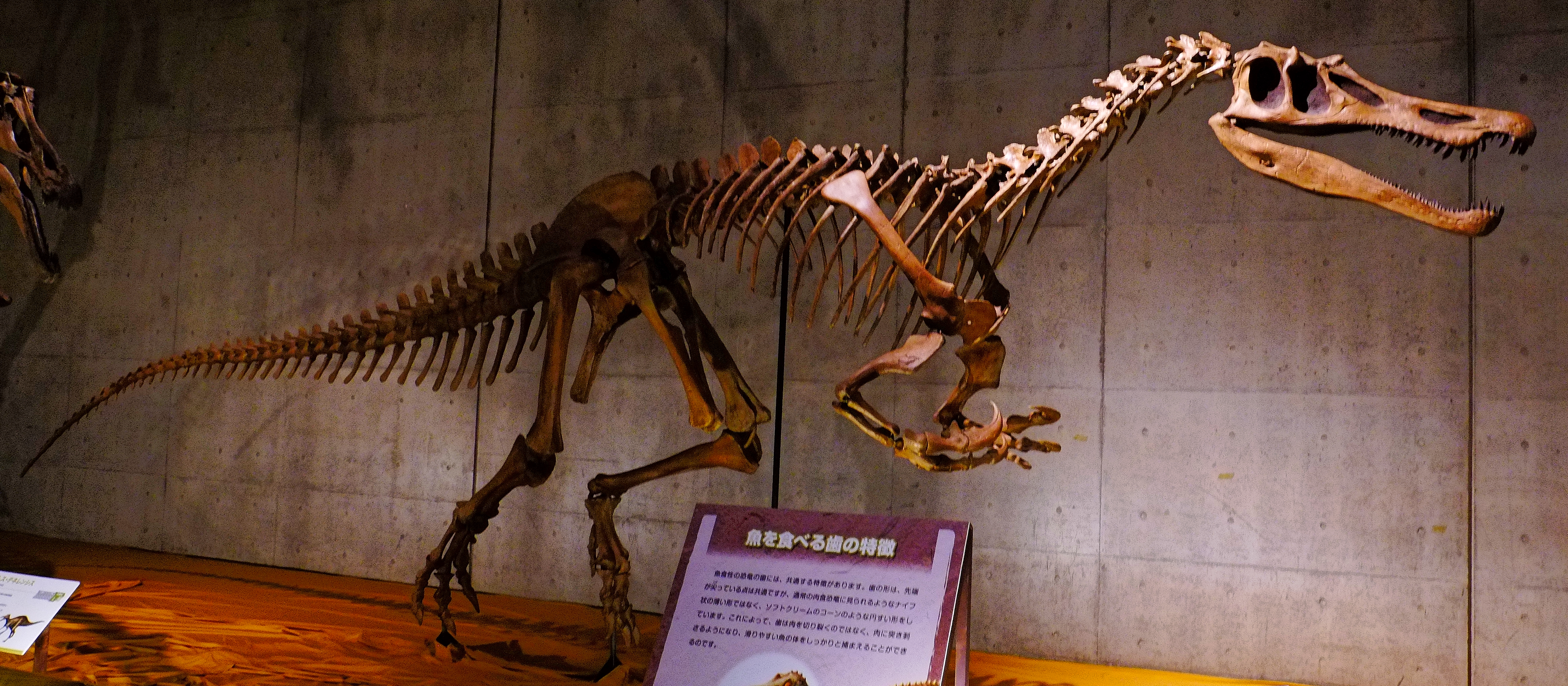
- Reconstructed skeletal mount at the National Museum of Nature and Science, Tokyo

Scientific classification
- Kingdom: Animalia
- Phylum: Chordata
- Class: Reptilia
- Clade: Dinosauria
- Clade: Saurischia
- Clade: Theropoda
- Family: †Spinosauridae
- Subfamily: †Baryonychinae
- Genus: †Baryonyx; Charig & Milner, 1986
- Species: †B. walkeri

Binomial name
- †Baryonyx walkeri Charig & Milner, 1986

= Baryonyx =

Baryonyx Temporal range: Barremian, 130–125 Ma

Genus of theropod dinosaurs

Baryonyx (/ˌbæriˈɒnɪks/) is a genus of theropod dinosaur which lived in the Barremian stage of the Early Cretaceous period, about 130–125 million years ago. The first skeleton was discovered in 1983 in the Smokejack Clay Pit, of Surrey, England, in sediments of the Weald Clay Formation, and became the holotype specimen of Baryonyx walkeri, named by palaeontologists Alan J. Charig and Angela C. Milner in 1986. The genus name Baryonyx comes from Ancient Greek βαρύς (barús), meaning "heavy" or "strong", and ὄνυξ (ónux), meaning "claw", alluding to the animal's very large claw on the first finger; the specific name, walkeri, refers to its discoverer, amateur fossil collector William J. Walker. The holotype specimen is one of the most complete theropod skeletons from the UK (and remains the most complete spinosaurid), and its discovery attracted media attention. Specimens later discovered in other parts of the United Kingdom and Iberia have also been assigned to the genus, though many have since been moved to new genera.

The holotype specimen, which may not have been fully grown, was estimated to have been between 7.5 and 10 metres (25 and 33 feet) long and to have weighed between 1.2 and 2 metric tons (1.3 and 2.2 short tons; 1.2 and 2.0 long tons). Baryonyx had a long, low, and narrow snout, which has been compared to that of a gharial. The tip of the snout expanded to the sides in the shape of a rosette. Behind this, the upper jaw had a notch which fitted into the lower jaw (which curved upwards in the same area). It had a triangular crest on the top of its nasal bones. Baryonyx had a large number of finely serrated, conical teeth, with the largest teeth in front. The neck formed an S-shape, and the neural spines of its dorsal vertebrae increased in height from front to back. One elongated neural spine indicates it may have had a hump or ridge along the centre of its back. It had robust forelimbs, with the eponymous first-finger claw measuring about 31 centimetres (12 inches) long.

Now recognised as a member of the family Spinosauridae, Baryonyx's affinities were obscure when it was discovered. Some researchers have suggested that Suchosaurus cultridens is a senior synonym (being an older name), and that Suchomimus tenerensis belongs in the same genus; subsequent authors have kept them separate. Baryonyx was the first theropod dinosaur demonstrated to have been piscivorous (fish-eating), as evidenced by fish scales in the stomach region of the holotype specimen. It may also have been an active predator of larger prey and a scavenger, since it also contained bones of a juvenile iguanodontian. The creature would have caught and processed its prey primarily with its forelimbs and large claws. Baryonyx may have had semi-aquatic habits, and coexisted with other theropod, ornithopod, and sauropod dinosaurs, as well as pterosaurs, crocodiles, turtles and fishes, in a fluvial environment.

== History of discovery ==
=== Holotype and naming ===
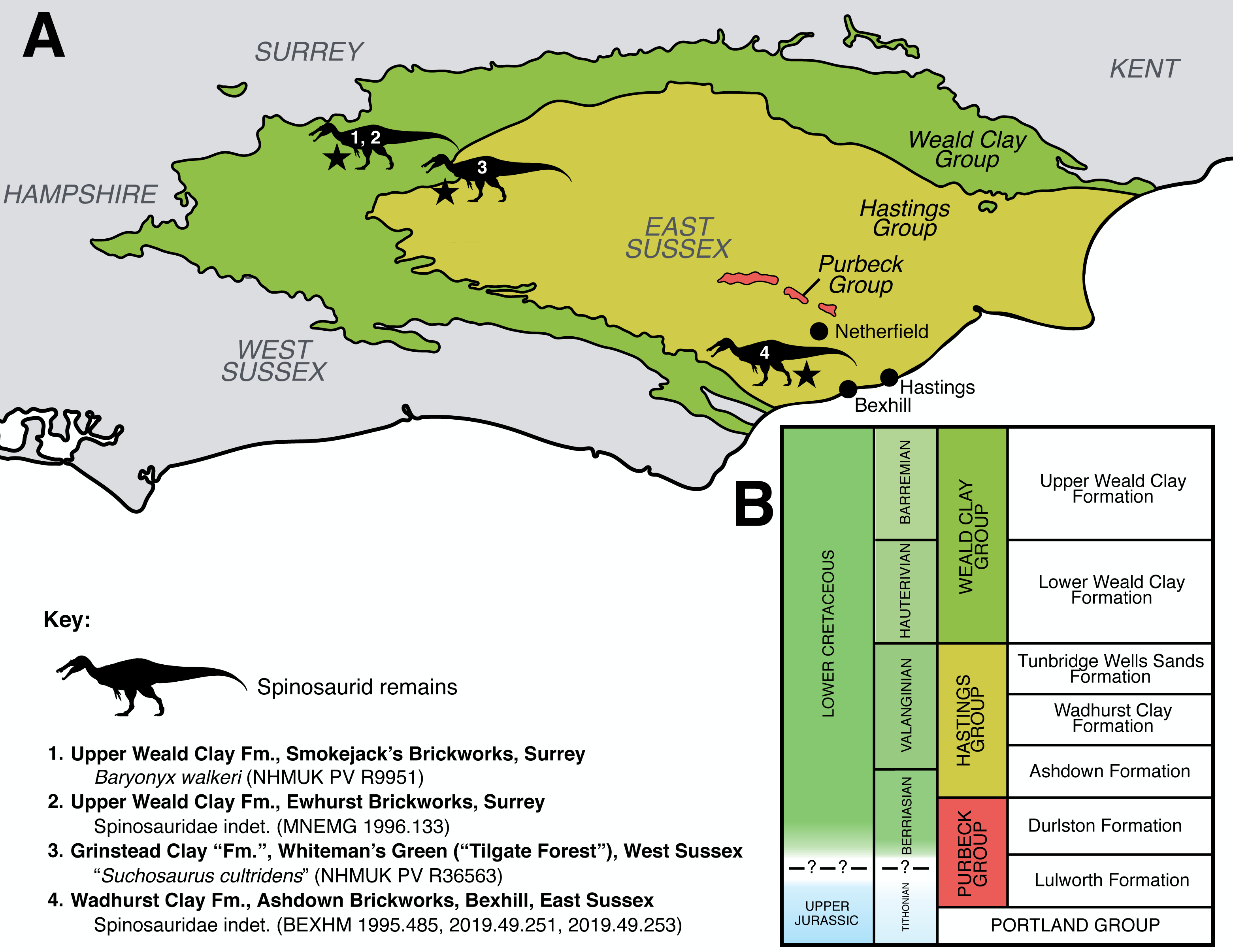
Map showing spinosaurid localities of southeast England; 1 is the Smokejack Clay Pit where Baryonyx was found.

In January 1983, the plumber and amateur fossil collector William J. Walker explored the Smokejack Clay Pit, a clay pit in the Weald Clay Formation near Ockley in Surrey, England. He found a rock wherein he discovered a large claw, but after piecing it together at home, he realised the tip of the claw was missing. Walker returned to the same spot in the pit some weeks later, and found the missing part after searching for an hour. He also found a phalanx bone and part of a rib. Walker's son-in-law later brought the claw to the Natural History Museum of London, where it was examined by the palaeontologists Alan J. Charig and Angela C. Milner, who identified it as belonging to a theropod dinosaur. The palaeontologists found more bone fragments at the site in February, but the entire skeleton could not be collected until May and June due to weather conditions at the pit. A team of eight museum staff members and several volunteers excavated 2 metric tons (2.2 short tons; 2.0 long tons) of rock matrix in 54 blocks over a three-week period. Walker donated the claw to the museum, and the Ockley Brick Company (owners of the pit) donated the rest of the skeleton and provided equipment. The area had been explored for 200 years, but no similar remains had been found before.

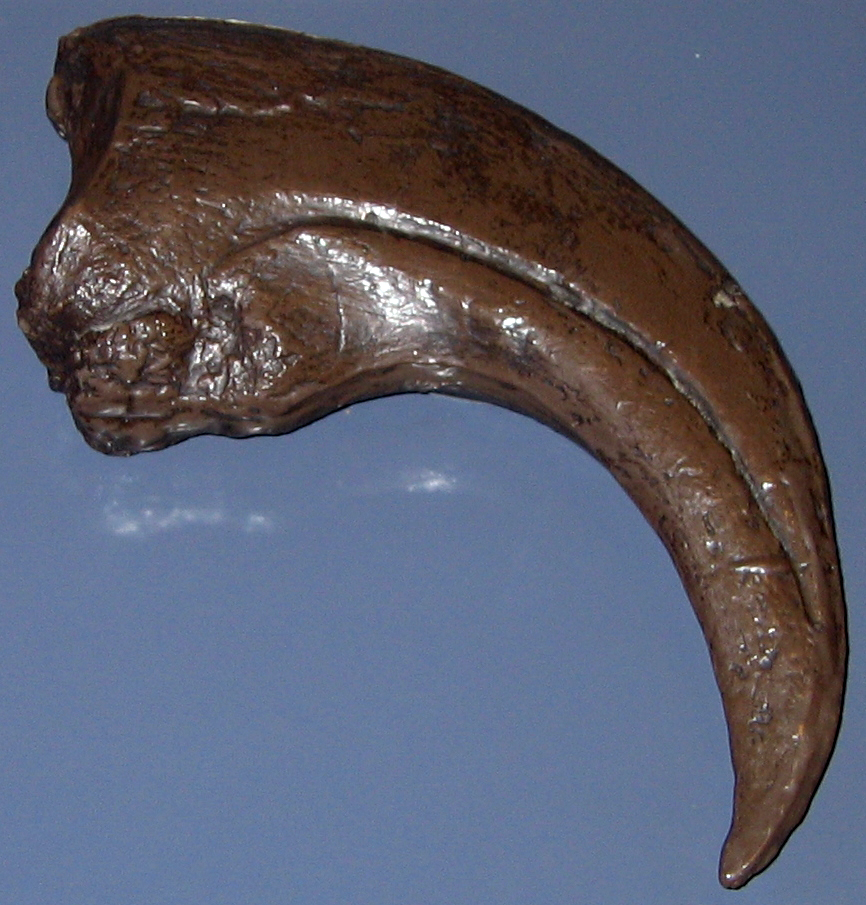
Cast of the claw of the first finger which the name Baryonyx was based on, in Palais de la Découverte, Paris

Most of the bones collected were encased in siltstone nodules surrounded by fine sand and silt, with the rest lying in clay. The bones were disarticulated and scattered over a 5-by-2-metre (16.4-by-6.6-foot) area, but most were not far from their natural positions. The position of some bones was disturbed by a bulldozer, and some were broken by mechanical equipment before they were collected. Preparing the specimen was difficult, due to the hardness of the siltstone matrix and the presence of siderite; acid preparation was attempted, but most of the matrix was removed mechanically. It took six years of almost constant preparation to get all the bones out of the rock, and by the end, dental tools and air mallets had to be used under a microscope. The specimen represents about 65 per cent of the skeleton, and consists of partial skull bones, including premaxillae (first bones of the upper jaw); the left maxillae (second bone of the upper jaw); both nasal bones; the left lacrimal; the left prefrontal; the left postorbital; the braincase including the occiput; both dentaries (the front bones of the lower jaw); various bones from the back of the lower jaw; teeth; cervical (neck), dorsal (back), and caudal (tail) vertebrae; ribs; a sternum; both scapulae (shoulder blades); both coracoids; both humeri (upper arm bones); the left radius and ulna (lower arm bones); finger bones and unguals (claw bones); hip bones; the upper end of the left femur (thigh bone) and lower end of the right; right fibula (of the lower leg); and foot bones including an ungual. The original specimen number was BMNH R9951, but it was later re-catalogued as NHMUK PV R9951.

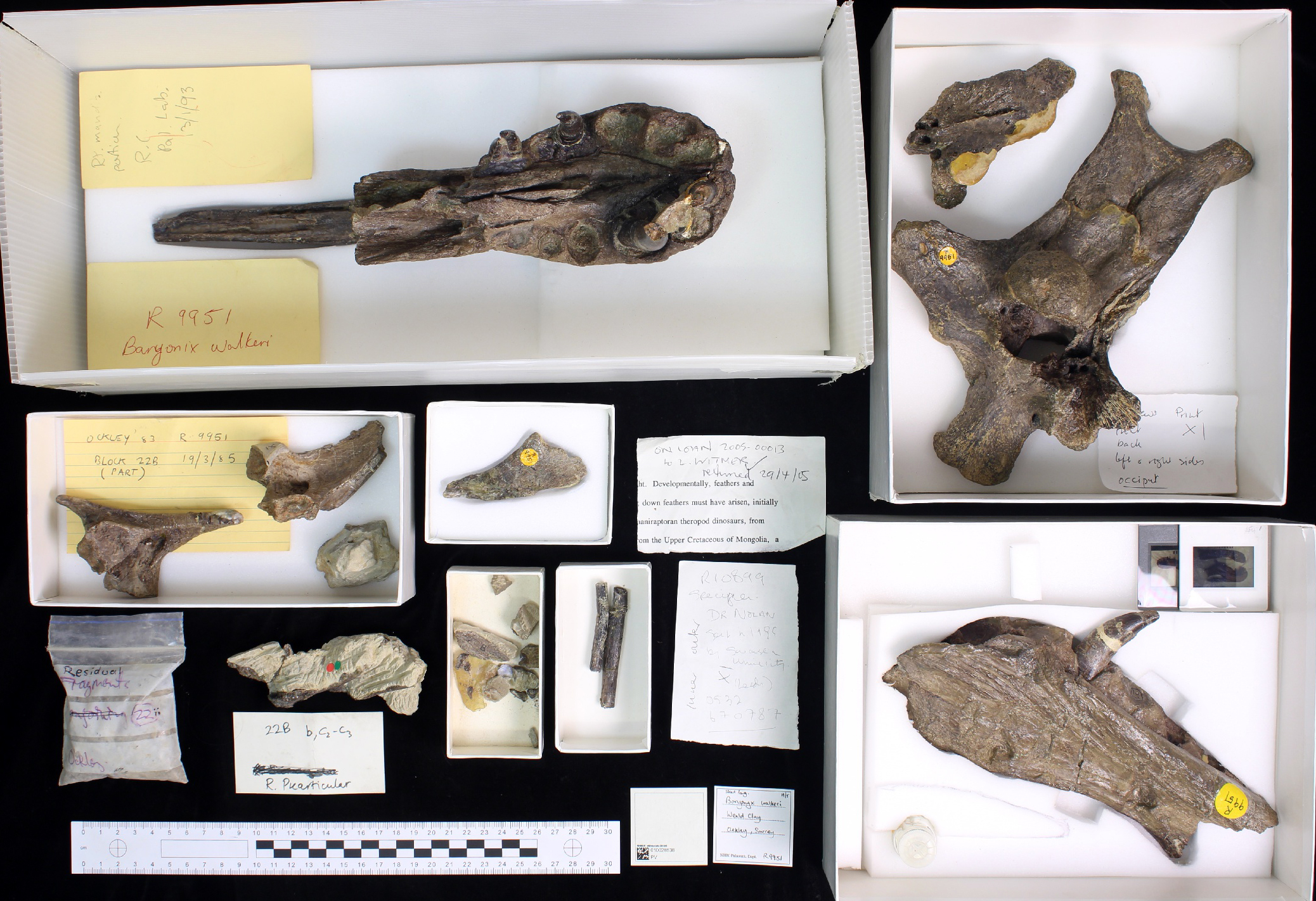
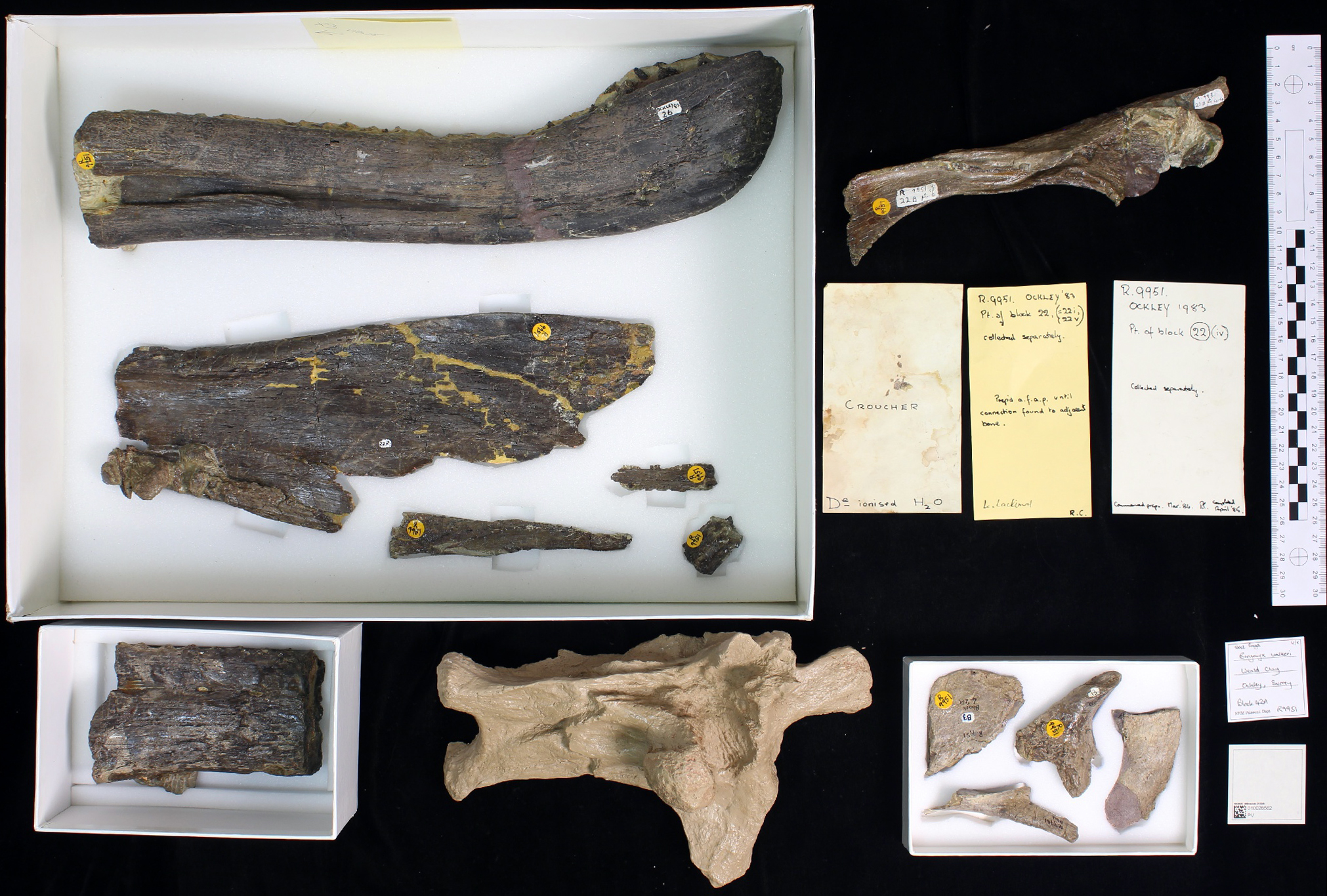
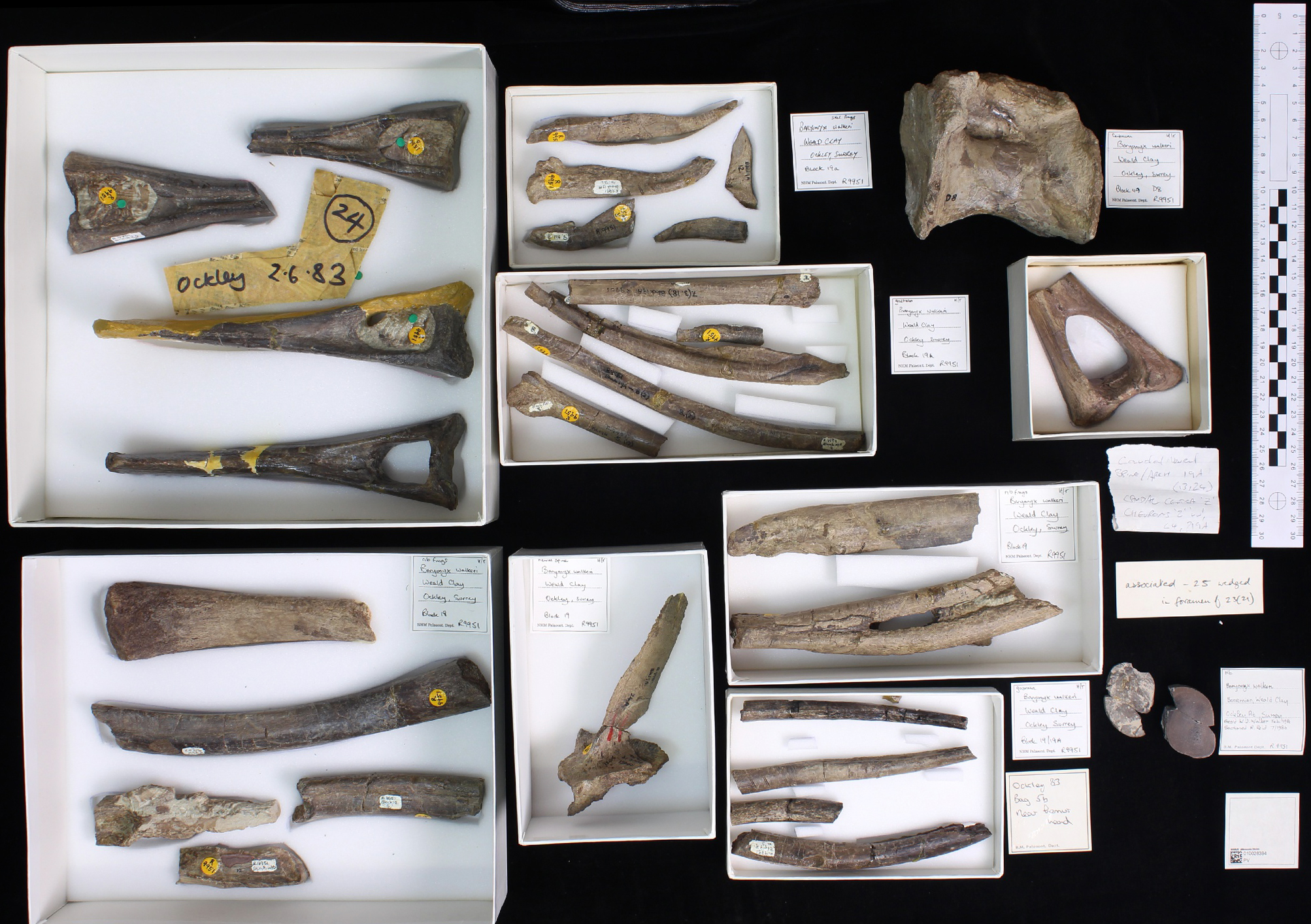
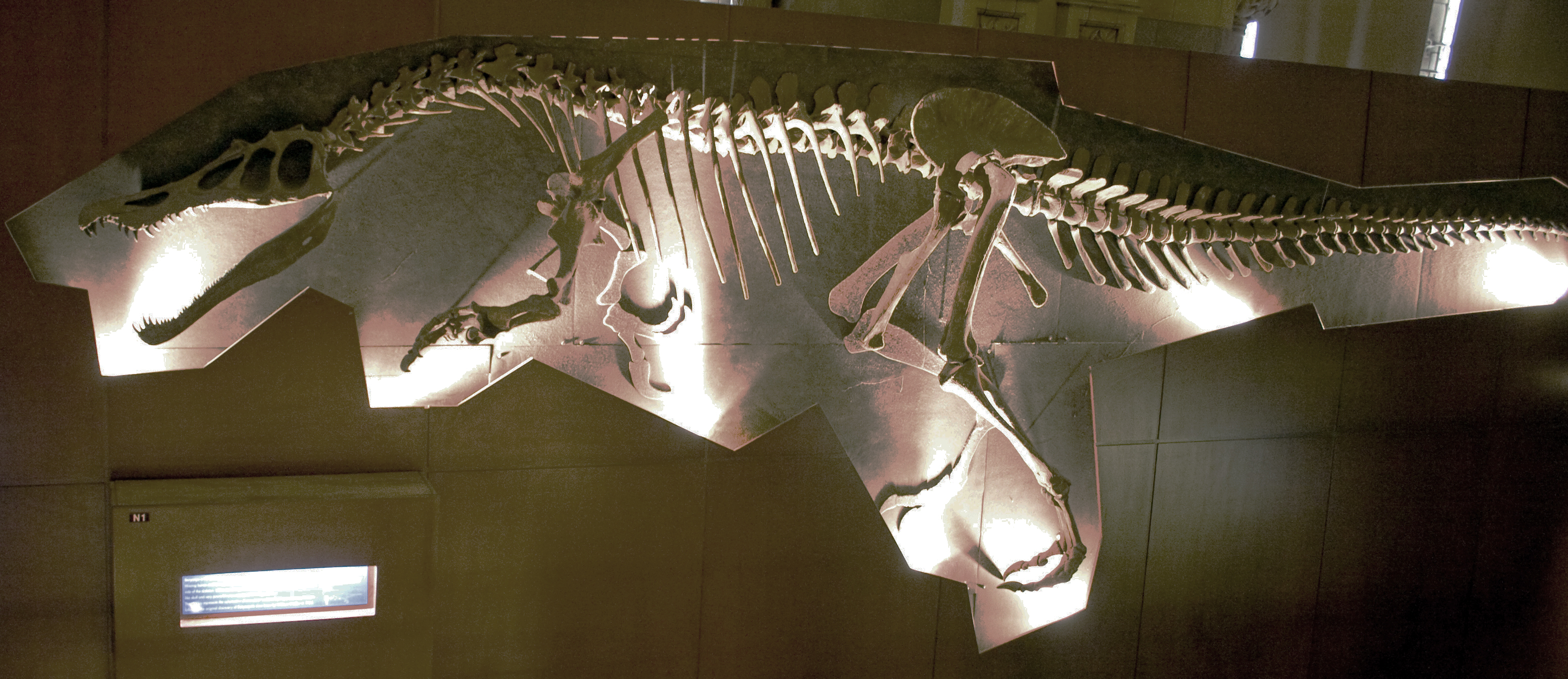
Skeletal elements of the holotype specimen (NHMUK PV R9951) as archived (above), and reconstructed skeleton on exhibit (below), in Natural History Museum, London

In 1986, Charig and Milner named a new genus and species with the skeleton as holotype specimen: Baryonyx walkeri. The genus name derives from Ancient Greek βαρύς (barús), meaning "heavy" or "strong", and ὄνυξ (ónux), meaning "claw". The specific name honours Walker, for discovering the specimen. At that time, the authors did not know if the large claw belonged to the hand or the foot (as in dromaeosaurs, which it was then assumed to be). The dinosaur had been presented earlier the same year during a lecture at a conference about dinosaur systematics in Drumheller, Canada. Due to ongoing work on the bones (70 per cent had been prepared at the time), they called their article preliminary and promised a more detailed description at a later date. Baryonyx was the first large Early Cretaceous theropod found anywhere in the world by that time. Before the discovery of Baryonyx the last significant theropod find in the United Kingdom was Eustreptospondylus in 1871, and in a 1986 interview Charig called Baryonyx "the best find of the century" in Europe. Baryonyx was widely featured in international media, and was nicknamed "Claws" by journalists punning on the title of the film Jaws. Its discovery was the subject of a 1987 BBC documentary, and a cast of the skeleton is mounted at the Natural History Museum in London. In 1997, Charig and Milner published a monograph describing the holotype skeleton in detail. The holotype specimen remains the most completely known spinosaurid skeleton.

=== Assigned specimens ===
Fossils from other parts of the UK and Iberia, mostly isolated teeth, have subsequently been attributed to Baryonyx or similar animals. Isolated teeth and bones from the Isle of Wight, including hand bones reported in 1998 and a vertebra reported by the palaeontologists Steve Hutt and Penny Newbery in 2004, have been attributed to this genus. A maxilla fragment from La Rioja, Spain, was attributed to Baryonyx by the palaeontologists Luis I. Viera and José Angel Torres in 1995 (although the palaeontologist Thomas R. Holtz and colleagues raised the possibility that it could have belonged to Suchomimus in 2004). In 1999, a postorbital, squamosal, tooth, vertebral remains, metacarpals (hand bones), and a phalanx from the Salas de los Infantes deposit in Burgos Province, Spain, were attributed to an immature Baryonyx (though some of these elements are unknown in the holotype) by the palaeontologist Carolina Fuentes Vidarte and colleagues. Dinosaur tracks near Burgos have also been suggested to belong to Baryonyx or a similar theropod.

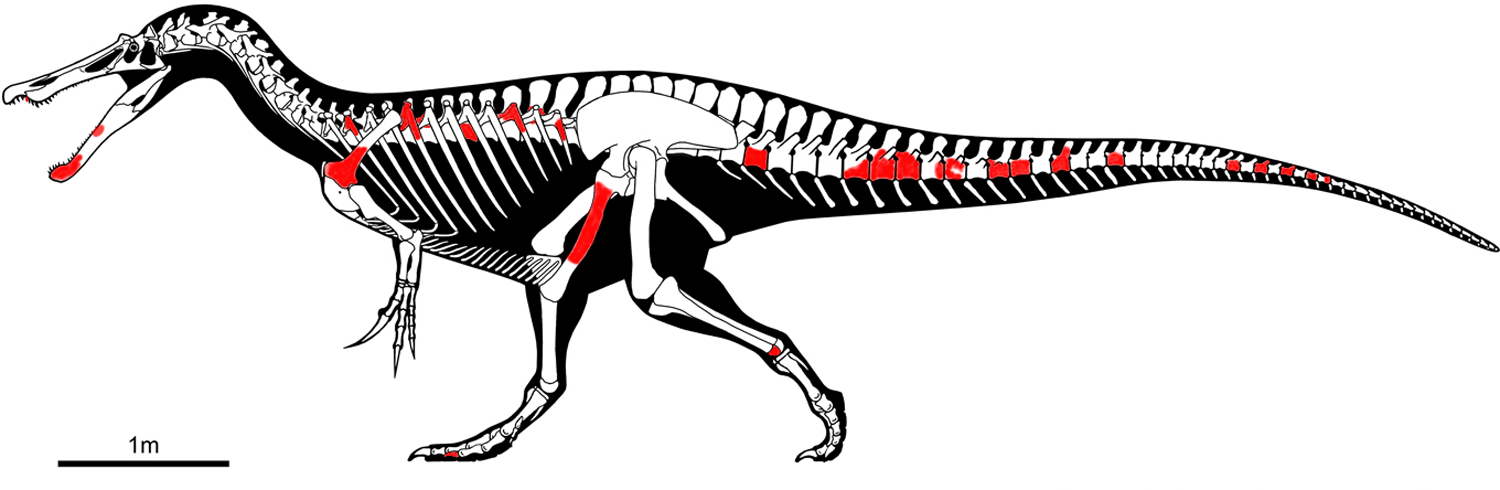
Skeletal diagram of Baryonyx with the bones of Portuguese specimen ML1190 shown in red; it was originally considered a specimen of Baryonyx, but was since moved to Iberospinus.

In 2011, a specimen (catalogued as ML1190 in Museu da Lourinhã) from the Papo Seco Formation in Boca do Chapim, Portugal, with a fragmentary dentary, teeth, vertebrae, ribs, hip bones, a scapula, and a phalanx bone, was attributed to Baryonyx by the palaeontologist Octávio Mateus and colleagues, the most complete Iberian remains of the animal. The skeletal elements of this specimen are also represented in the more complete holotype (which was of similar size), except for the mid-neck vertebrae. In 2019, the palaeontologist Thomas M. S. Arden and colleagues found that the Portuguese skeleton did not belong to Baryonyx, since the front of its dentary bone was not strongly upturned. This specimen was made the basis of the new genus Iberospinus by Mateus and Darío Estraviz-López in 2022. Multiple studies found that additional spinosaurid remains from Iberia may belong to taxa other than Baryonyx, such as Vallibonavenatrix and Protathlitis, or may be indeterminate. A 2024 article by the palaeontologist Erik Isasmendi and colleagues reviewed the spinosaurid fossil record of Iberia and concluded that no specimens from there could be assigned to Baryonyx. They moved a specimen formerly assigned to Baryonyx from La Rioja to the new genus Riojavenatrix.

In 2021, the palaeontologist Chris T. Barker and colleagues described two new spinosaurid genera from the Wessex Formation of the Isle of Wight, Ceratosuchops and Riparovenator (the latter named R. milnerae honouring Milner for her contributions to spinosaurid research), and stated that spinosaurid material from there that had previously been attributed to the contemporary Baryonyx could have belonged to other taxa instead. These specimens had previously been assigned to Baryonyx in a 2017 conference abstract. Barker and colleagues stated that the recognition of the Wessex Formation specimens as new genera renders the presence of Baryonyx there ambiguous, and most of the previously assigned isolated material from the Wealden Supergroup is therefore indeterminate. A 2023 study of an isolated tooth by Barker and colleagues found that it and other teeth from the Wealden Supergroup that have previously been assigned to Baryonyx probably do not belong to the genus, based on their morphology and age.

=== Possible synonyms ===
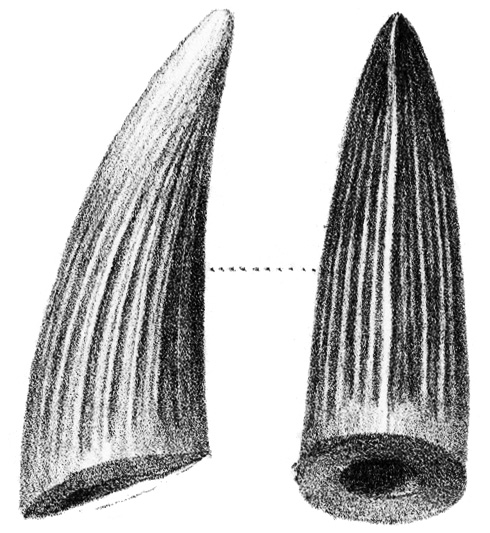
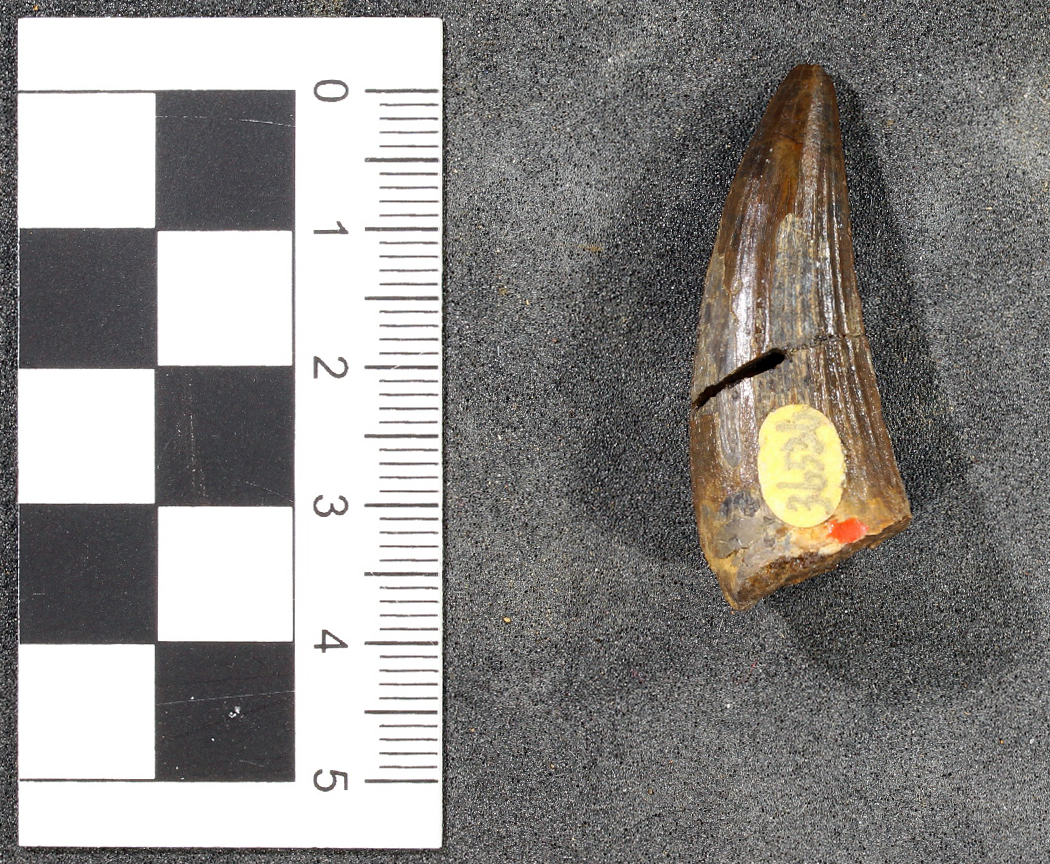
1878 lithograph (left) and modern photo showing the holotype tooth of Suchosaurus cultridens, which may represent the same animal as B. walkeri

In 2003, Milner noted that some teeth at the Natural History Museum previously identified as belonging to the genera Suchosaurus (the first named spinosaurid) and Megalosaurus probably belonged to Baryonyx. The type species of Suchosaurus, S. cultridens, was named by the biologist Richard Owen in 1841, based on teeth discovered by the geologist Gideon A. Mantell in Tilgate Forest. Owen originally thought the teeth to have belonged to a crocodile; he was yet to name the group Dinosauria, which happened the following year. A second species, S. girardi, was named by the palaeontologist Henri Émile Sauvage in 1897, based on jaw fragments and a tooth from Boca do Chapim, Portugal. In 2007, the palaeontologist Éric Buffetaut considered the teeth of S. girardi very similar to those of Baryonyx (and S. cultridens) except for the stronger development of the tooth crown flutes (or "ribs"; lengthwise ridges), suggesting that the remains belonged to the same genus. Buffetaut agreed with Milner that the teeth of S. cultridens were almost identical to those of B. walkeri, but with a ribbier surface. The former taxon might be a senior synonym of the latter (since it was published first), depending on whether the differences were within a taxon or between different ones. According to Buffetaut, since the holotype specimen of S. cultridens is a single tooth and that of B. walkeri is a skeleton, it would be more practical to retain the newer name. In 2011, Mateus and colleagues agreed that Suchosaurus was closely related to Baryonyx, but considered both species in the former genus nomina dubia (dubious names) since their holotype specimens were not considered diagnostic (lacking distinguishing features) and could not be definitely equated with other taxa. Barker and colleagues agreed with this in 2023.

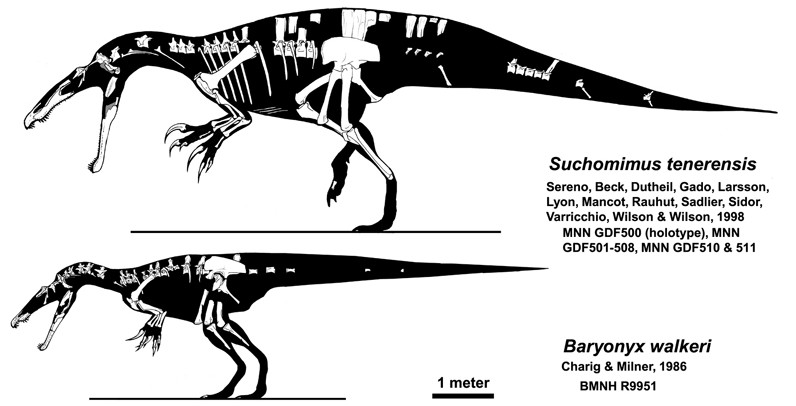
Skeletal diagram of the holotype specimen (below) compared with the related genus Suchomimus

In 1997, Charig and Milner noted that two fragmentary spinosaurid snouts from the Elrhaz Formation of Niger (reported by the palaeontologist Philippe Taquet in 1984) were similar enough to Baryonyx that they considered them to belong to an indeterminate species of the genus (despite their much younger Aptian geological age). In 1998, these fossils became the basis of the genus and species Cristatusaurus lapparenti, named by Taquet and the palaeontologist Dale Russell. The palaeontologist Paul Sereno and colleagues named the new genus and species Suchomimus tenerensis later in 1998, based on more complete fossils from the Elrhaz Formation. In 2002, the palaeontologist Hans-Dieter Sues and colleagues proposed that Suchomimus tenerensis was similar enough to Baryonyx walkeri to be considered a species within the same genus (as B. tenerensis), and that Suchomimus was identical to Cristatusaurus. Milner concurred that the material from Niger was indistinguishable from Baryonyx in 2003. In a 2004 conference abstract, Hutt and Newberry supported the synonymy based on a large theropod vertebra from the Isle of Wight which they attributed to an animal closely related to Baryonyx and Suchomimus.

Later studies have kept Baryonyx and Suchomimus separate, whereas Cristatusaurus has been proposed to be either a nomen dubium or possibly distinct from both. A 2017 review paper by the palaeontologist Carlos Roberto A. Candeiro and colleagues stated that this debate was more in the realm of semantics than science, as it is generally agreed that B. walkeri and S. tenerensis are distinct, related species. Barker and colleagues found Suchomimus to be closer related to the British genera Riparovenator and Ceratosuchops than to Baryonyx in 2021. In 2026, the palaeontologist Frédéric Pittet found that assigned specimens of Cristatusaurus and Suchomimus shared features such as a crest on the premaxilla not found in Baryonyx, and suggested this confirmed the synonymy of the Nigerien taxa.

== Description ==
Size of various spinosaurids (Baryonyx in yellow) compared with a human

Baryonyx is estimated to have been between 7.5 and 10 m (25 and 33 ft) long, 2.5 m (8.2 ft) in hip height, and to have weighed between 1.2 and 2 t (1.3 and 2.2 short tons; 1.2 and 2.0 long tons). The fact that elements of the skull and vertebral column of the B. walkeri holotype specimen (NHM R9951) do not appear to have co-ossified (fused) suggests that the individual was not fully grown, and the mature animal may have been much larger (as is the case for some other spinosaurids). On the other hand, the specimen's fused sternum indicates that it may have been mature.

=== Skull ===
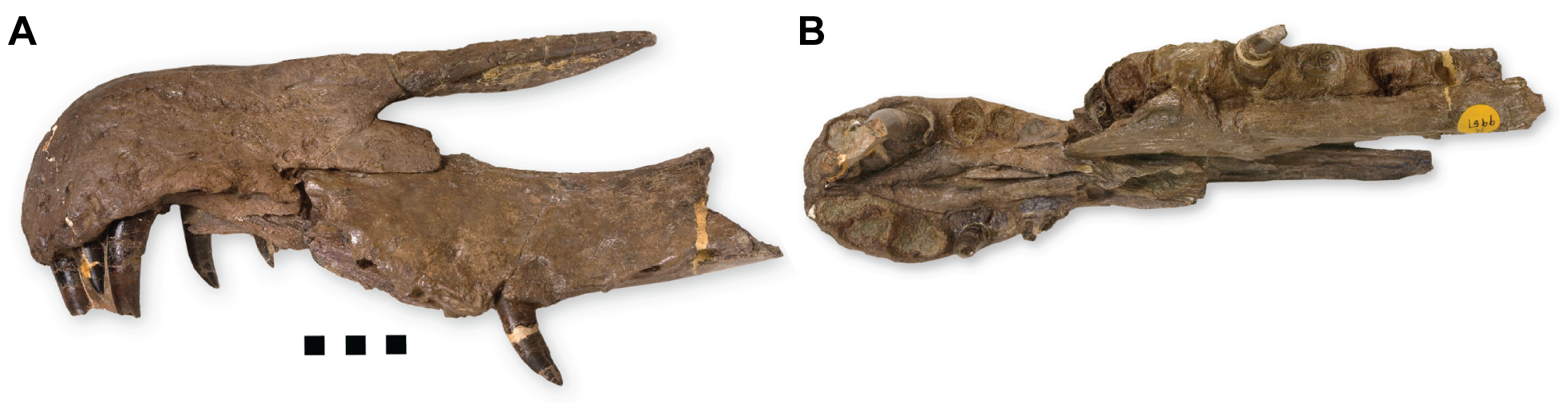
Snout of the holotype specimen, from the left and below

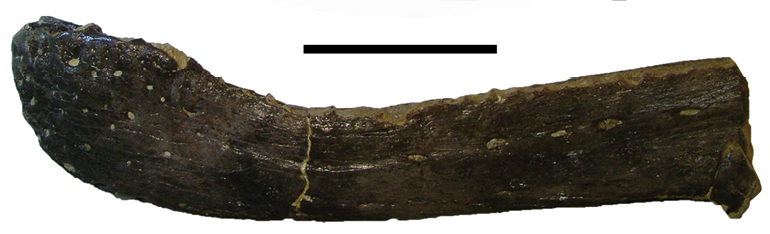
Holotype dentary from the left

The skull of Baryonyx is incompletely known, and much of the middle and hind portions are not preserved. The full length of the skull is estimated to have been 91–95 centimetres (36–37 inches) long, based on comparison with that of the related genus Suchomimus (which was 20% larger). It was elongated, and the front 17 cm (6.7 in) of the premaxillae formed a long, narrow, and low snout (rostrum) with a smoothly rounded upper surface. The external nares (bony nostrils) were long, low, and placed far back from the snout tip. The front 13 cm (5.1 in) of the snout expanded into a spatulate (spoon-like), "terminal rosette", a shape similar to the rostrum of the modern gharial. The front 7 cm (2.8 in) of the lower margin of the premaxillae was downturned (or hooked), whereas that of the front portion of the maxillae was upturned. This morphology resulted in a sigmoid or S-shaped margin of the lower upper tooth row, in which the teeth from the front of the maxilla were projecting forward. The snout was particularly narrow directly behind the rosette — similar to what one would see in a crocodile; this area received the large teeth of the mandible. The maxilla and premaxilla of Baryonyx fit together in a complex articulation, and the resulting gap between the upper and lower jaw is known as the subrostral notch. A downturned premaxilla and a sigmoid lower margin of the upper tooth row was also present in distantly related theropods such as Dilophosaurus. The snout had extensive foramina (openings), which would have been exits for blood vessels and nerves, and the maxilla appears to have housed sinuses.

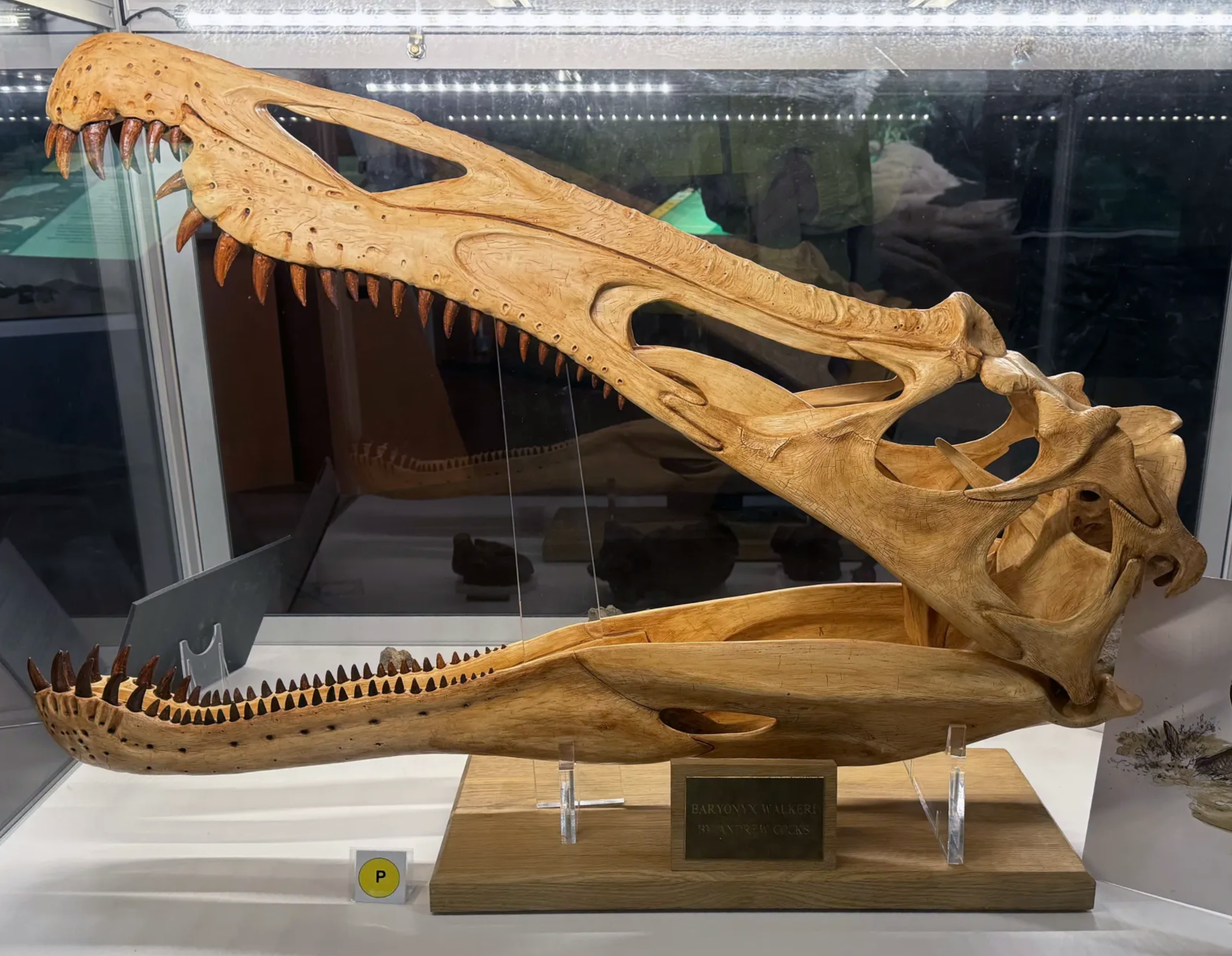
A reconstruction of the skull of Baryonyx on display at Dinosaur Isle

Baryonyx had a rudimentary secondary palate, similar to crocodiles but unlike most theropod dinosaurs. A rugose (roughly wrinkled) surface suggests the presence of a horny pad in the roof of the mouth. The nasal bones were fused, which distinguished Baryonyx from other spinosaurids, and a sagittal crest was present above the eyes, on the upper mid-line of the nasals. This crest was triangular, narrow, and sharp in its front part, and was distinct from those of other spinosaurids in ending hind wards in a cross-shaped process. The lacrimal bone in front of the eye appears to have formed a horn core similar to those seen, for example, in Allosaurus, and was distinct from other spinosaurids in being solid and almost triangular. The occiput was narrow, with the paroccipital processes pointing outwards horizontally, and the basipterygoid processes were lengthened, descending far below the basioccipital (the lowermost bone of the occiput). Sereno and colleagues suggested that some of Baryonyx's cranial bones had been misidentified by Charig and Milner, resulting in the occiput being reconstructed as too deep, and that the skull was instead probably as low, long and narrow as that of Suchomimus. The front 14 cm (5.5 in) of the dentary in the mandible sloped upwards towards the curve of the snout. The dentary was very long and shallow, with a prominent Meckelian groove on the inner side. The mandibular symphysis, where the two halves of the lower jaw connected at the front, was particularly short. The rest of the lower jaw was fragile; the hind third was much thinner than the front, with a blade-like appearance. The front part of the dentary curved outwards to accommodate the large front teeth, and this area formed the mandibular part of the rosette. The dentary–like the snout—had many foramina.

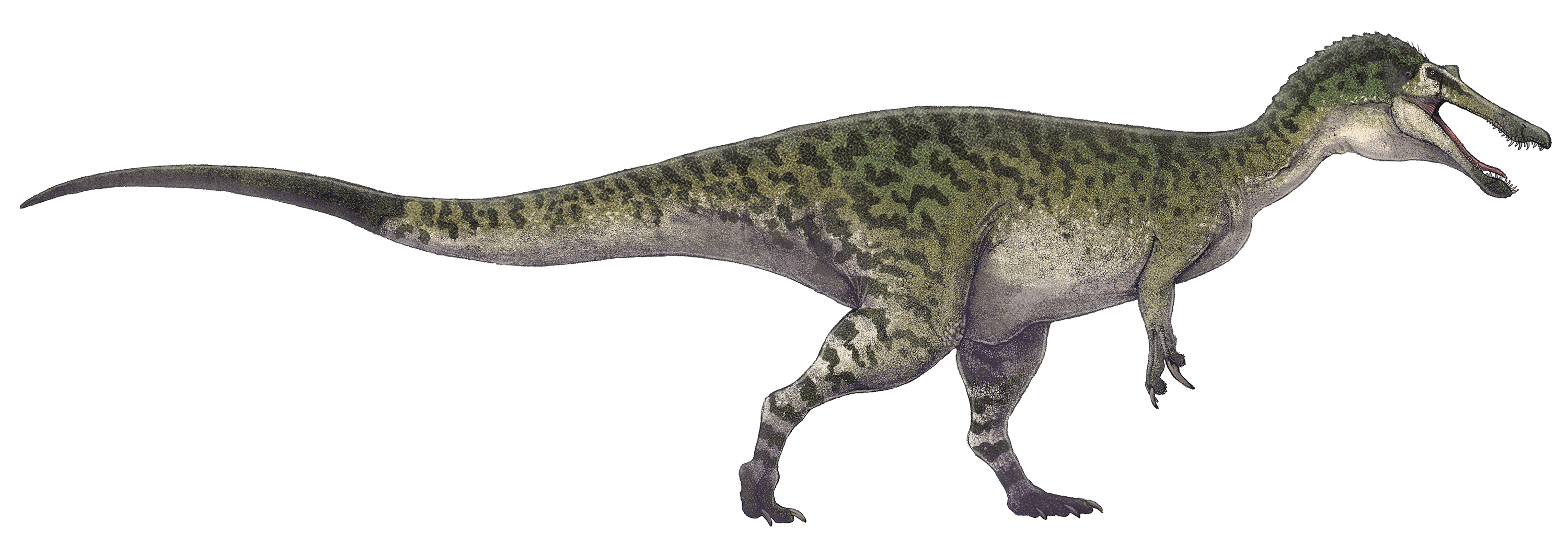
Life restoration

Most of the teeth found with the holotype specimen were not in articulation with the skull; a few remained in the upper jaw, and only small replacement teeth were still borne by the lower jaw. The teeth had the shape of recurved cones, where slightly flattened from sideways, and their curvature was almost uniform. The roots were very long, and tapered towards their extremity. The carinae (sharp front and back edges) of the teeth were finely serrated with denticles on the front and back, and extended all along the crown. There were around six to eight denticles per mm (0.039 in), a much larger number than in large-bodied theropods like Torvosaurus and Tyrannosaurus. Some of the teeth were fluted, with six to eight ridges along the length of their inner sides and fine-grained enamel (outermost layer of teeth), while others bore no flutes; their presence is probably related to position or ontogeny (development during growth). The inner side of each tooth row had a bony wall. The number of teeth was large compared to most other theropods, with six to seven teeth in each premaxilla and thirty-two in each dentary. Based on the closer packing and smaller size of the dentary teeth compared to those in the corresponding length of the premaxilla, the difference between the number of teeth in the upper and lower jaws appears to have been more pronounced than in other theropods. The terminal rosette in the upper jaw of the holotype had thirteen dental alveoli (tooth sockets), six on the left and seven on the right side, showing tooth count asymmetry. The first four upper teeth were large (with the second and third the largest), while the fourth and fifth progressively decreased in size. The diameter of the largest was twice that of the smallest. The first four alveoli of the dentary (corresponding to the tip of the upper jaw) were the largest, with the rest more regular in size. Small subtriangular interdental plates were present between the alveoli.

=== Postcranial skeleton ===
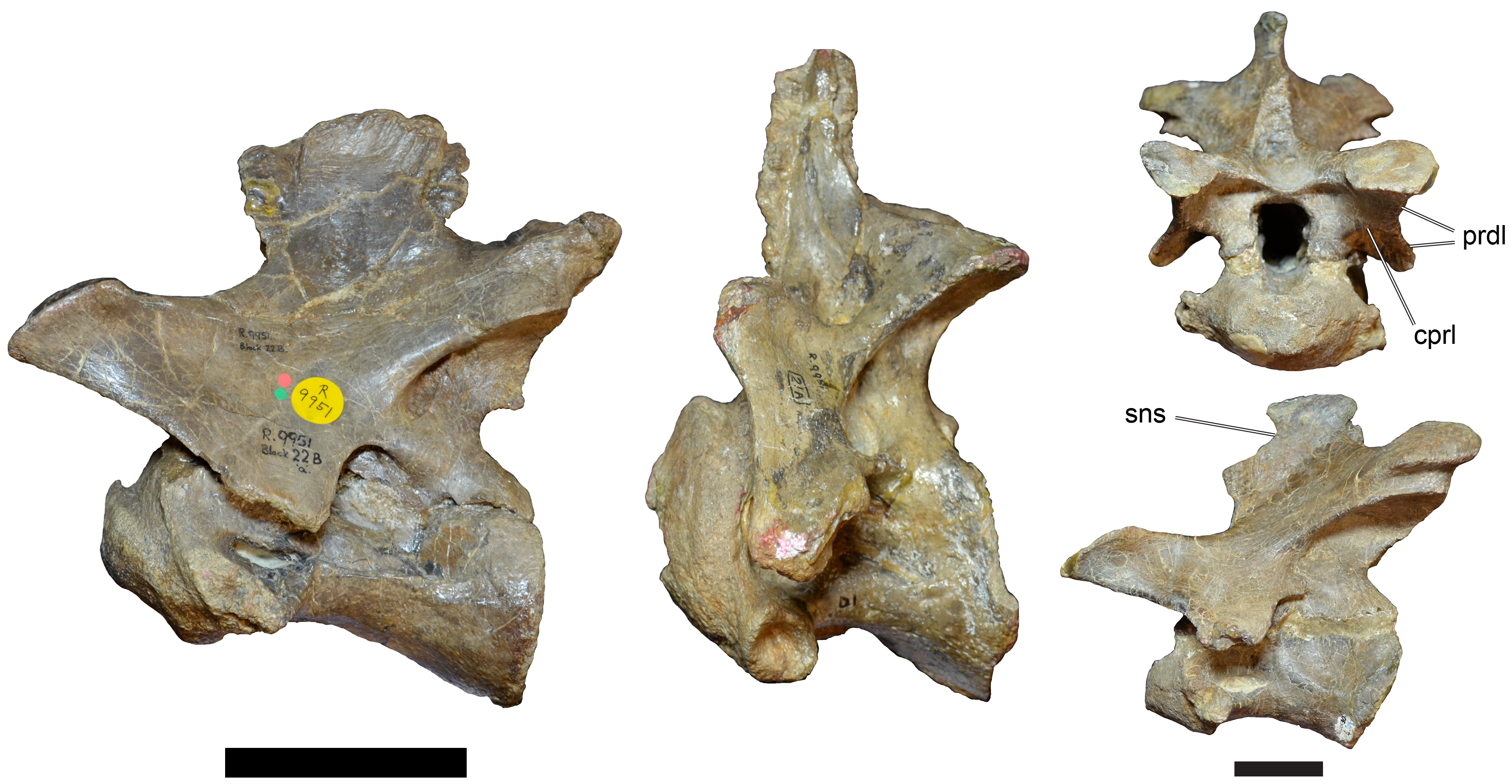
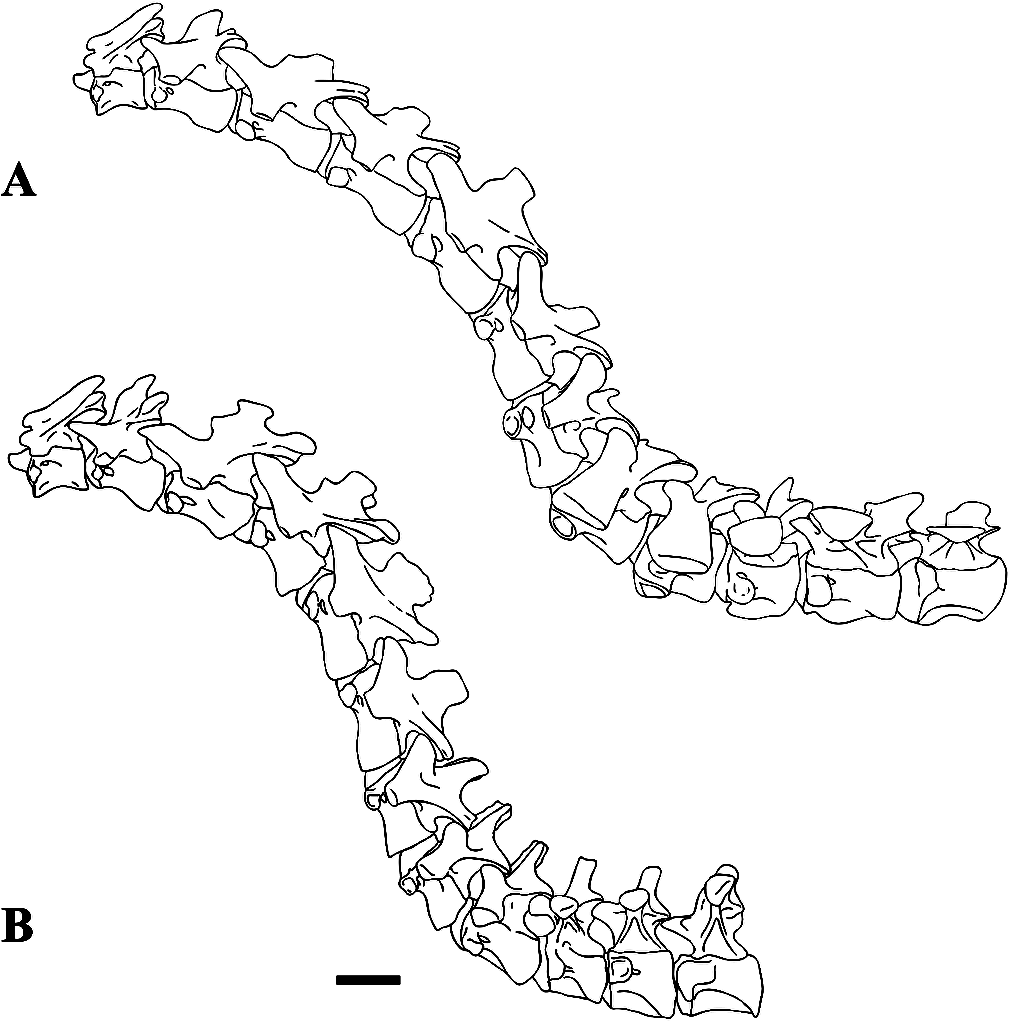
Three cervical vertebrae from the neck of the holotype in left side view, the third also shown from the front (left), and reconstructed necks of the spinosaurids Sigilmassasaurus (A) and Baryonyx (B), showing their curvature (right)

Initially thought to have lacked the sigmoid curve typical of theropods, the neck of Baryonyx does appear to have formed an S shape, though straighter than in other theropods. The cervical vertebrae of the neck tapered towards the head and became progressively longer front to back. Their zygapophyses (the processes that connected the vertebrae) were flat, and their epipophyses (processes to which neck muscles attached) were well developed. The axis (the second neck vertebra) was small relative to the size of the skull and had a well-developed hyposphene. The neural arches of the cervical vertebrae were not always sutured to the centra (the bodies of the vertebrae), and the neural spines there were low and thin. The cervical ribs were short, similar to those of crocodiles, and possibly overlapped each other somewhat. The centra of the dorsal vertebrae of the back were similar in size. Like in other theropods, the skeleton of Baryonyx showed skeletal pneumaticity, reducing its weight through fenestrae (openings) in the neural arches and pleurocoels (hollow depressions) in the centra (primarily near the transverse processes). From front to back, the neural spines of the dorsal vertebrae changed from short and stout to tall and broad. One isolated dorsal neural spine was moderately elongated and slender, indicating that Baryonyx may have had a hump or ridge along the centre of its back (though incipiently developed compared to those of other spinosaurids). Baryonyx was unique among spinosaurids in having a marked constriction from side to side in a vertebra that either belonged to the sacrum or front of the tail.

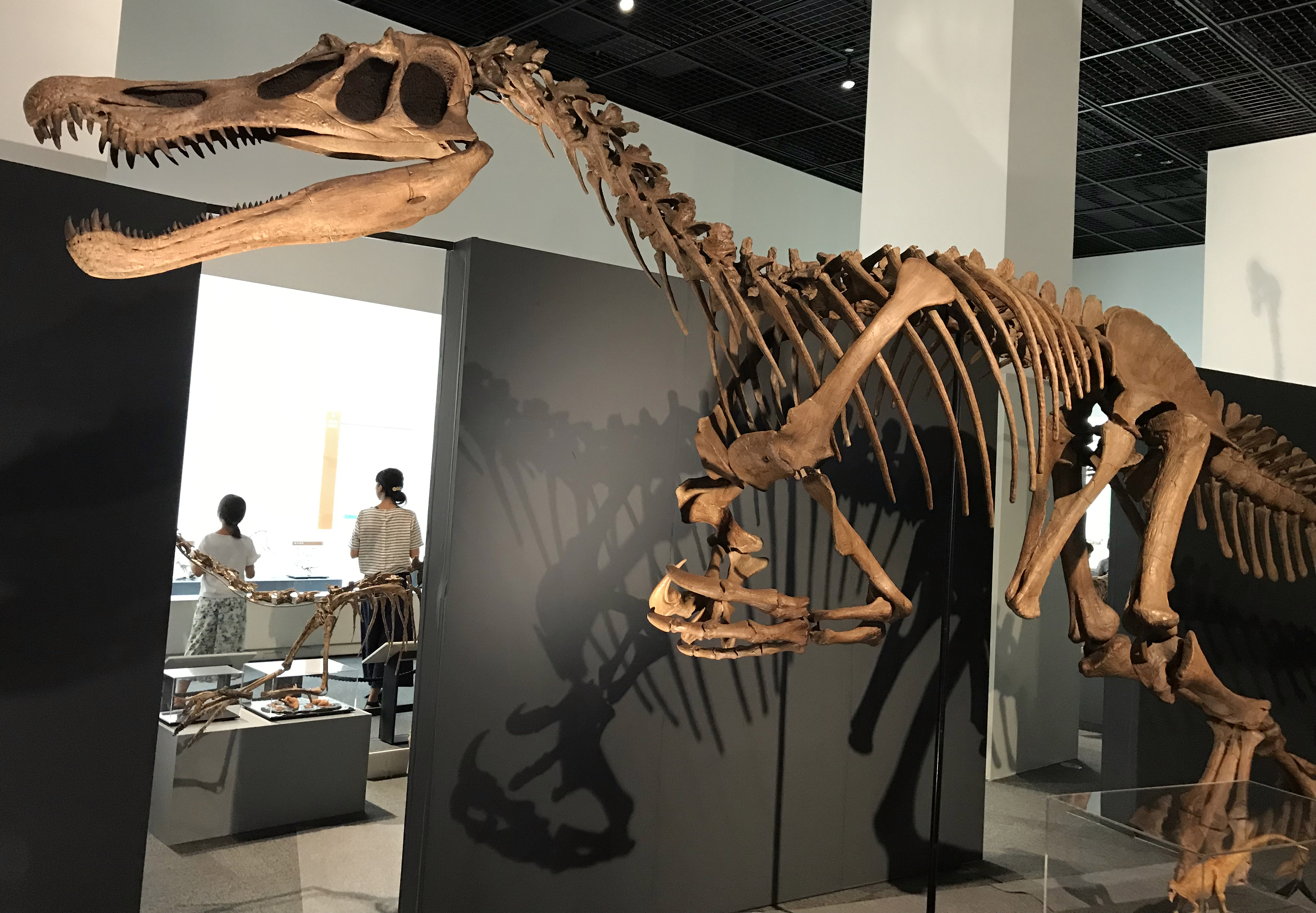
Reconstructed skeleton in Japan

The coracoid tapered hind-wards when viewed in profile, and, uniquely among spinosaurids, connected with the scapula in a peg-and-notch articulation. The scapulae were robust and the bones of the forelimb were short in relation to the animal's size, but broad and sturdy. The humerus was short and stout, with its ends broadly expanded and flattened—the upper side for the deltopectoral crest and muscle attachment and the lower for articulation with the radius and ulna. The radius was short, stout and straight, and less than half the length of the humerus, while the ulna was a little longer. The ulna had a powerful olecranon and an expanded lower end. The hands had three fingers; the first finger bore a large claw measuring about 31 cm (12 in) along its curve in the holotype specimen. The claw would have been lengthened by a keratin (horny) sheath in life. Apart from its size, the claw's proportions were fairly typical of a theropod, i.e. it was bilaterally symmetric, slightly compressed, smoothly rounded, and sharply pointed. A groove for the sheath ran along the length of the claw. The other claws of the hand were much smaller. The ilium (main hip bone) of the pelvis had a prominent supracetabular crest, an anterior process that was slender and vertically expanded, and a posterior process that was long and straight. The ilium also had a prominent brevis shelf and a deep grove that faced downwards. The acetabulum (the socket for the femur) was long from front to back. The ischium (lower and rearmost hip bone) had a well developed obturator process at the upper part. The margin of the pubic blade at the lower end was turned outward, and the pubic foot was not expanded. The femur lacked a groove on the fibular condyle, and, uniquely among spinosaurids, the fibula had a very shallow fibular fossa (depression).

== Classification ==
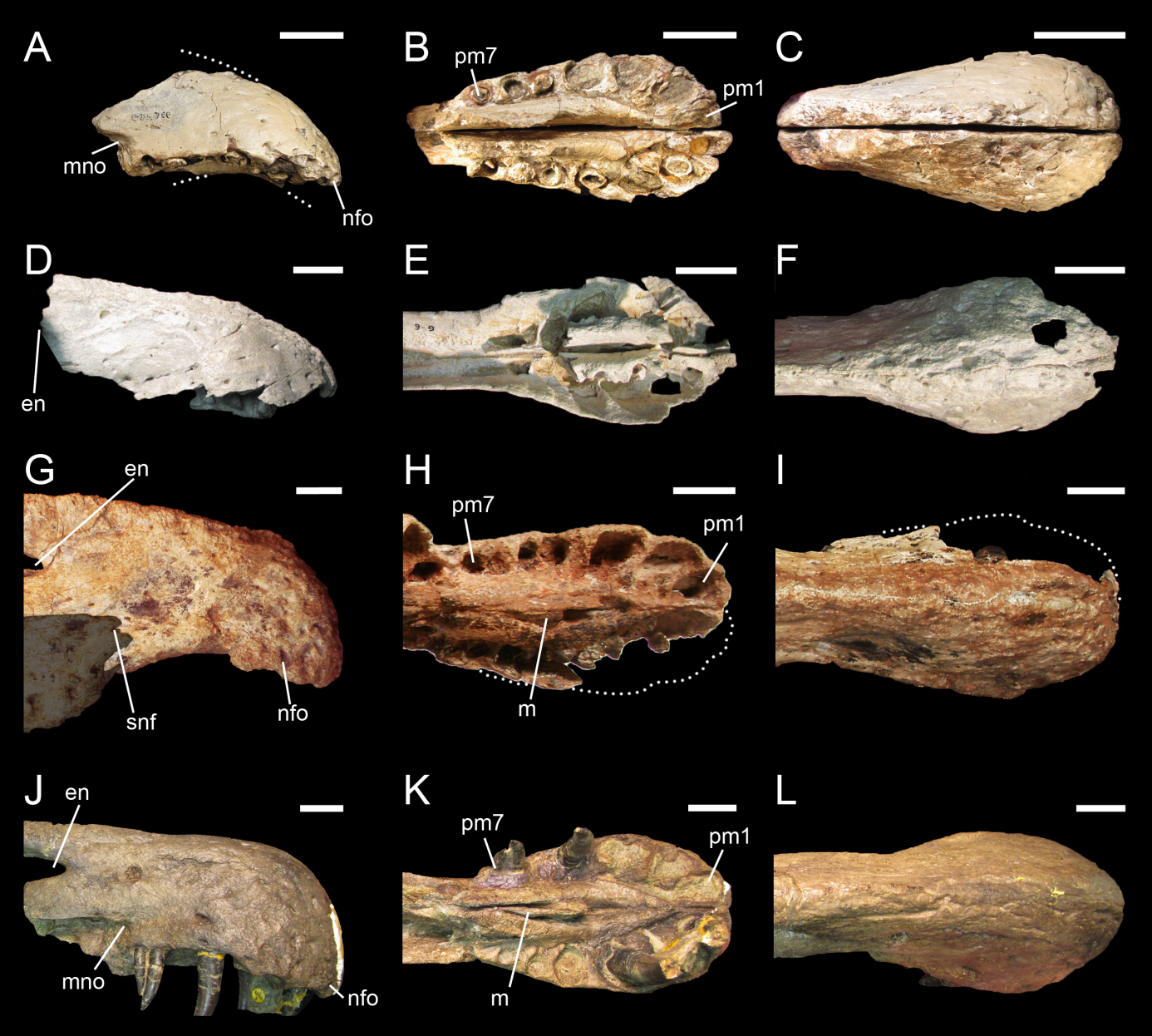
Snouts of Cristatusaurus (A–C), Suchomimus (D–I), and Baryonyx (J–L)

In their original description, Charig and Milner found Baryonyx unique enough to warrant a new family of theropod dinosaurs: Baryonychidae. They found Baryonyx to be unlike any other theropod group, and considered the possibility that it was a thecodont (a grouping of early archosaurs now considered unnatural), due to having apparently primitive features, but noted that the articulation of the maxilla and premaxilla was similar to that in Dilophosaurus. They also noted that the two snouts from Niger (which later became the basis of Cristatusaurus), assigned to the family Spinosauridae by Taquet in 1984, appeared almost identical to that of Baryonyx and they referred them to Baryonychidae instead. In 1988, the palaeontologist Gregory S. Paul agreed with Taquet that Spinosaurus, described in 1915 based on fragmentary remains from Egypt that were destroyed in World War II, and Baryonyx were similar and (due to their kinked snouts) possibly late-surviving dilophosaurs. Buffetaut also supported this relationship in 1989. In 1990, Charig and Milner dismissed the spinosaurid affinities of Baryonyx, since they did not find their remains similar enough. In 1997, they agreed that Baryonychidae and Spinosauridae were related, but disagreed that the former name should become a synonym of the latter, because the completeness of Baryonyx compared to Spinosaurus made it a better type genus for a family, and because they did not find the similarities between the two significant enough. Holtz and colleagues listed Baryonychidae as a synonym of Spinosauridae in 2004.

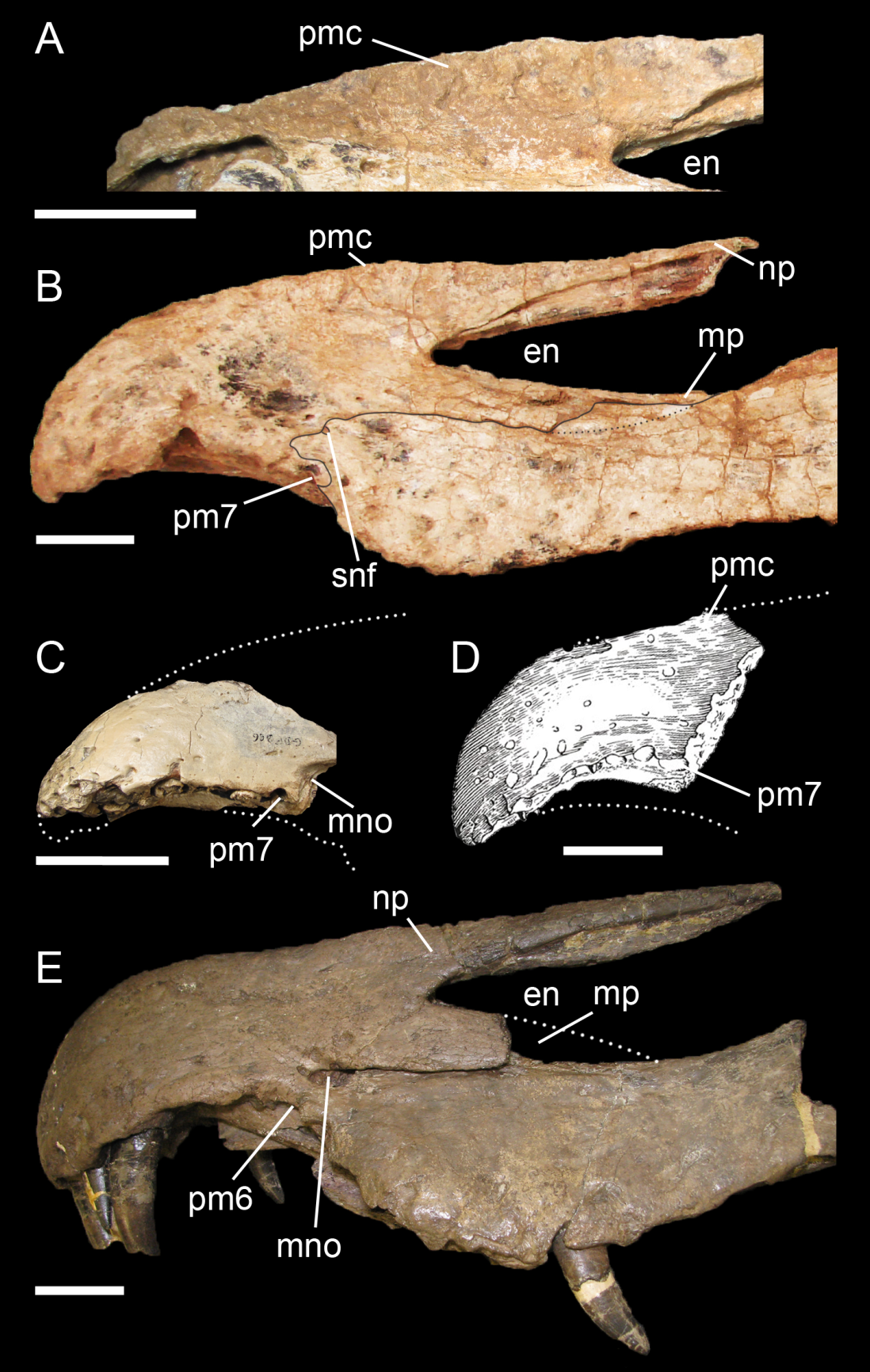
Comparison between the snouts of Suchomimus (A, B), Cristatusaurus (C, D), and Baryonyx (E)

Discoveries in the 1990s shed more light on the relationships of Baryonyx and its relatives. In 1996, a snout from Morocco was referred to Spinosaurus, and Irritator and Angaturama from Brazil (the two are possible synonyms) were named. Cristatusaurus and Suchomimus were named based on fossils from Niger in 1998. In their description of Suchomimus, Sereno and colleagues placed it and Baryonyx in the new subfamily Baryonychinae within Spinosauridae; Spinosaurus and Irritator were placed in the subfamily Spinosaurinae. Baryonychinae was distinguished by the small size and larger number of teeth in the dentary behind the terminal rosette, the deeply keeled front dorsal vertebrae, and by having serrated teeth. Spinosaurinae was distinguished by their straight tooth crowns without serrations, small first tooth in the premaxilla, increased spacing of teeth in the jaws, and possibly by having their nostrils placed further back and the presence of a deep neural spine sail. They also united the spinosaurids and their closest relatives in the superfamily Spinosauroidea, but in 2010, the palaeontologist Roger Benson considered this a junior synonym of Megalosauroidea (an older name). In a 2007 conference abstract, the palaeontologist Denver W. Fowler suggested that since Suchosaurus is the first named genus in its group, the clade names Spinosauroidea, Spinosauridae, and Baryonychinae should be replaced by Suchosauroidea, Suchosauridae, and Suchosaurinae, regardless of whether or not the name Baryonyx is retained. A 2017 study by the palaeontologists Marcos A. F. Sales and Cesar L. Schultz found that the clade Baryonychinae was not well supported, since serrated teeth may be an ancestral trait among spinosaurids.

Barker and colleagues found support for a Baryonychinae-Spinosaurinae split in 2021, and the following cladogram shows the position of Baryonyx within Spinosauridae according to their study:

- Megalosauridae
- Spinosauridae
  - Vallibonavenatrix
  - - Baryonychinae
      - - ML1190 (then cf. Baryonyx sp., now Iberospinus)
        - Baryonyx
      - Ceratosuchopsini
        - Suchomimus
        - - Riparovenator
          - Ceratosuchops
    - Spinosaurinae
      - Camarillasaurus
      - - Ichthyovenator
        - - Irritator
          - Spinosaurini
            - Sigilmassasaurus
            - - "Spinosaurus B"
              - - MSNM-V4047
                - - FSAC-KK11888
                  - Spinosaurus holotype

=== Evolution ===
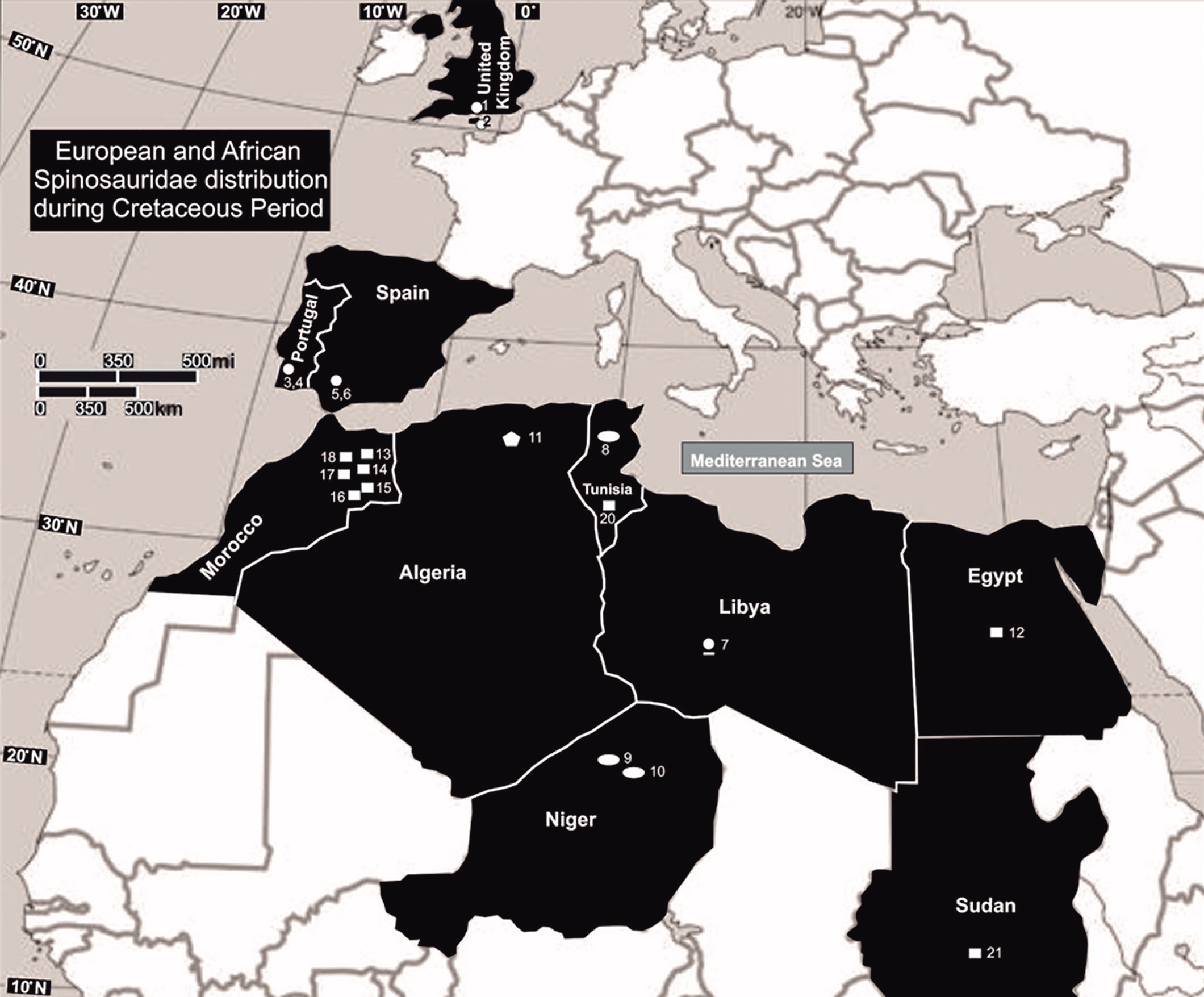
Distribution of spinosaurids in Europe and North Africa during the Cretaceous; 1, 3, 4, 5, 6 are Baryonyx

Spinosaurids appear to have been widespread from the Barremian to the Cenomanian stages of the Cretaceous period, about 130 to 95 million years ago, while the oldest known spinosaurid remains date to the Middle Jurassic. They shared features such as long, narrow, crocodile-like skulls; sub-circular teeth, with fine to no serrations; the terminal rosette of the snout; and a secondary palate that made them more resistant to torsion. In contrast, the primitive and typical condition for theropods was a tall, narrow snout with blade-like (ziphodont) teeth with serrated carinae. The skull adaptations of spinosaurids converged with those of crocodilians; early members of the latter group had skulls similar to typical theropods, later developing elongated snouts, conical teeth, and secondary palates. These adaptations may have been the result of a dietary change from terrestrial prey to fish. Unlike crocodiles, the post-cranial skeletons of baryonychine spinosaurids do not appear to have aquatic adaptations. Sereno and colleagues proposed in 1998 that the large thumb-claw and robust forelimbs of spinosaurids evolved in the Middle Jurassic, before the elongation of the skull and other adaptations related to fish-eating, since the former features are shared with their megalosaurid relatives. They also suggested that the spinosaurines and baryonychines diverged before the Barremian age of the Early Cretaceous.

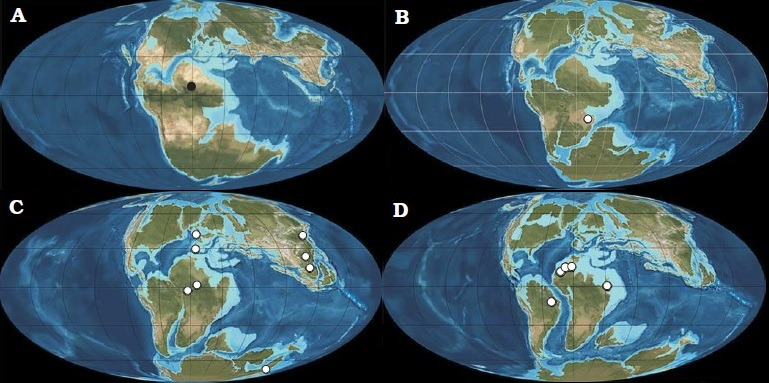
Palaeogeographic locations of spinosaurid fossils through time; C shows the Barremian−Aptian when Baryonyx lived

Several theories have been proposed about the biogeography of the spinosaurids. Since Suchomimus was more closely related to Baryonyx (from Europe) than to Spinosaurus—although that genus also lived in Africa—the distribution of spinosaurids cannot be explained as vicariance resulting from continental rifting. Sereno and colleagues proposed that spinosaurids were initially distributed across the supercontinent Pangea, but split with the opening of the Tethys Sea. Spinosaurines would then have evolved in the south (Africa and South America: in Gondwana) and baryonychines in the north (Europe: in Laurasia), with Suchomimus the result of a single north-to-south dispersal event. Buffetaut and the Tunisian palaeontologist Mohamed Ouaja also suggested in 2002 that baryonychines could be the ancestors of spinosaurines, which appear to have replaced the former in Africa. Milner suggested in 2003 that spinosaurids originated in Laurasia during the Jurassic, and dispersed via the Iberian land bridge into Gondwana, where they radiated. In 2007, Buffetaut pointed out that palaeogeographical studies had demonstrated that Iberia was near northern Africa during the Early Cretaceous, which he found to confirm Milner's idea that the Iberian region was a stepping stone between Europe and Africa, which is supported by the presence of baryonychines in Iberia. The direction of the dispersal between Europe and Africa is still unknown, and subsequent discoveries of spinosaurid remains in Asia and possibly Australia indicate that it may have been complex.

Candeiro and colleagues suggested in 2017 that spinosaurids of northern Gondwana were replaced by other predators, such as abelisauroids, since no definite spinosaurid fossils are known from after the Cenomanian anywhere in the world. They attributed the disappearance of spinosaurids and other shifts in the fauna of Gondwana to changes in the environment, perhaps caused by transgressions in sea level. Malafaia and colleagues stated in 2020 that Baryonyx remains the oldest unquestionable spinosaurid, while acknowledging that older remains had also been tentatively assigned to the group. Barker and colleagues found support for a European origin for spinosaurids in 2021, with an expansion to Asia and Gondwana during the first half of the Early Cretaceous. In contrast to Sereno, these authors suggested there had been at least two dispersal events from Europe to Africa, leading to Suchomimus and the African part of Spinosaurinae.

== Palaeobiology ==
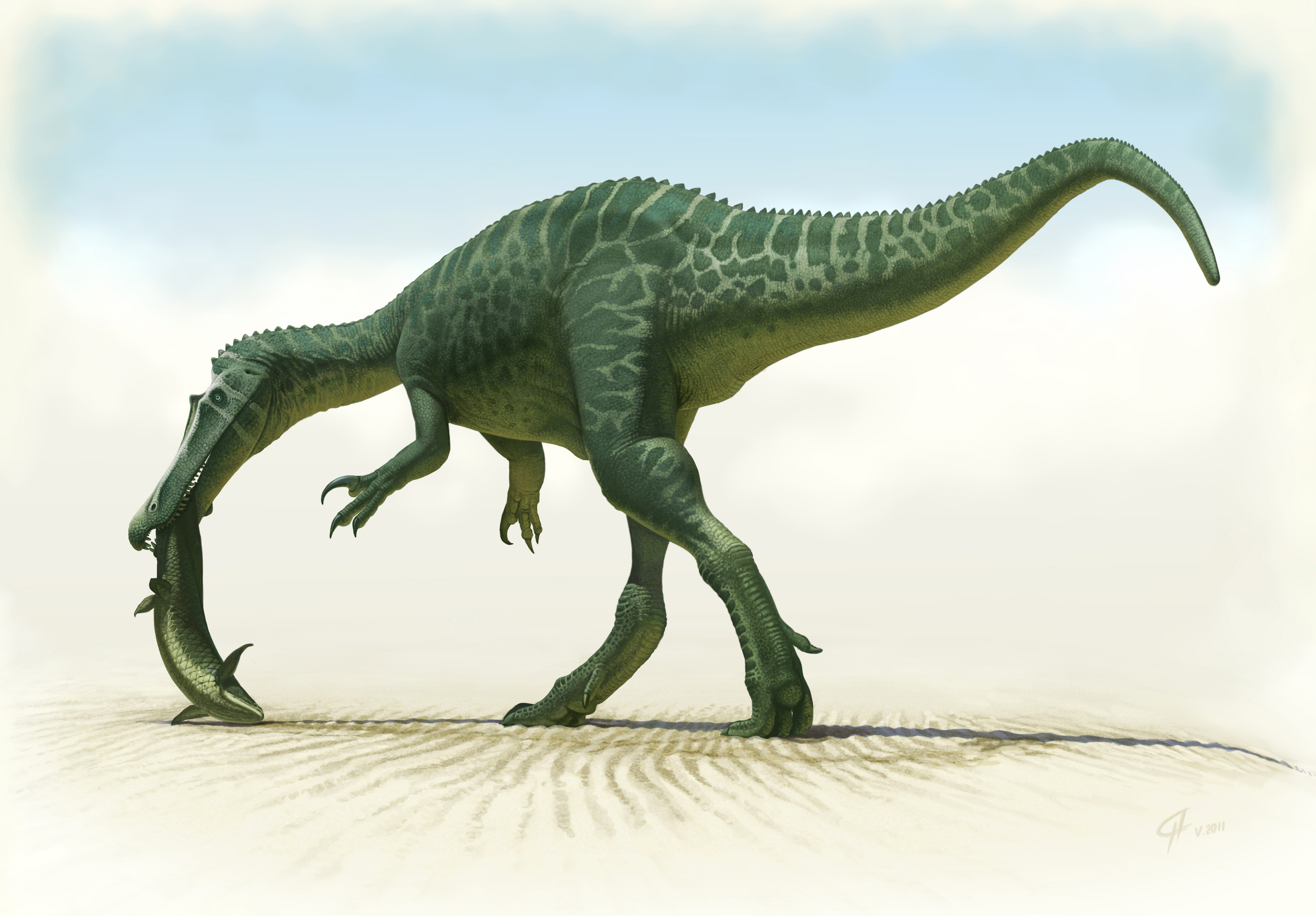
Restoration of Baryonyx eating a lungfish

=== Diet and feeding ===
In 1986, Charig and Milner suggested that its elongated snout with many finely serrated teeth indicated that Baryonyx was piscivorous (fish-eating), speculating that it crouched on a riverbank and used its claw to gaff fish out of the water (similar to the modern grizzly bear). Two years earlier, Taquet pointed out that the spinosaurid snouts from Niger were similar to those of the modern gharial and suggested a behaviour similar to herons or storks. In 1987, the biologist Andrew Kitchener disputed the piscivorous behaviour of Baryonyx and suggested that it would have been a scavenger, using its long neck to feed on the ground, its claws to break into a carcass, and its long snout (with nostrils far back for breathing) for investigating the body cavity. Kitchener argued that Baryonyx's jaws and teeth were too weak to kill other dinosaurs and too heavy to catch fish, with too many adaptations for piscivory. According to the palaeontologist Robin E. H. Reid, a scavenged carcass would have been broken up by its predator and large animals capable of doing so—such as grizzly bears—are also capable of catching fish (at least in shallow water).

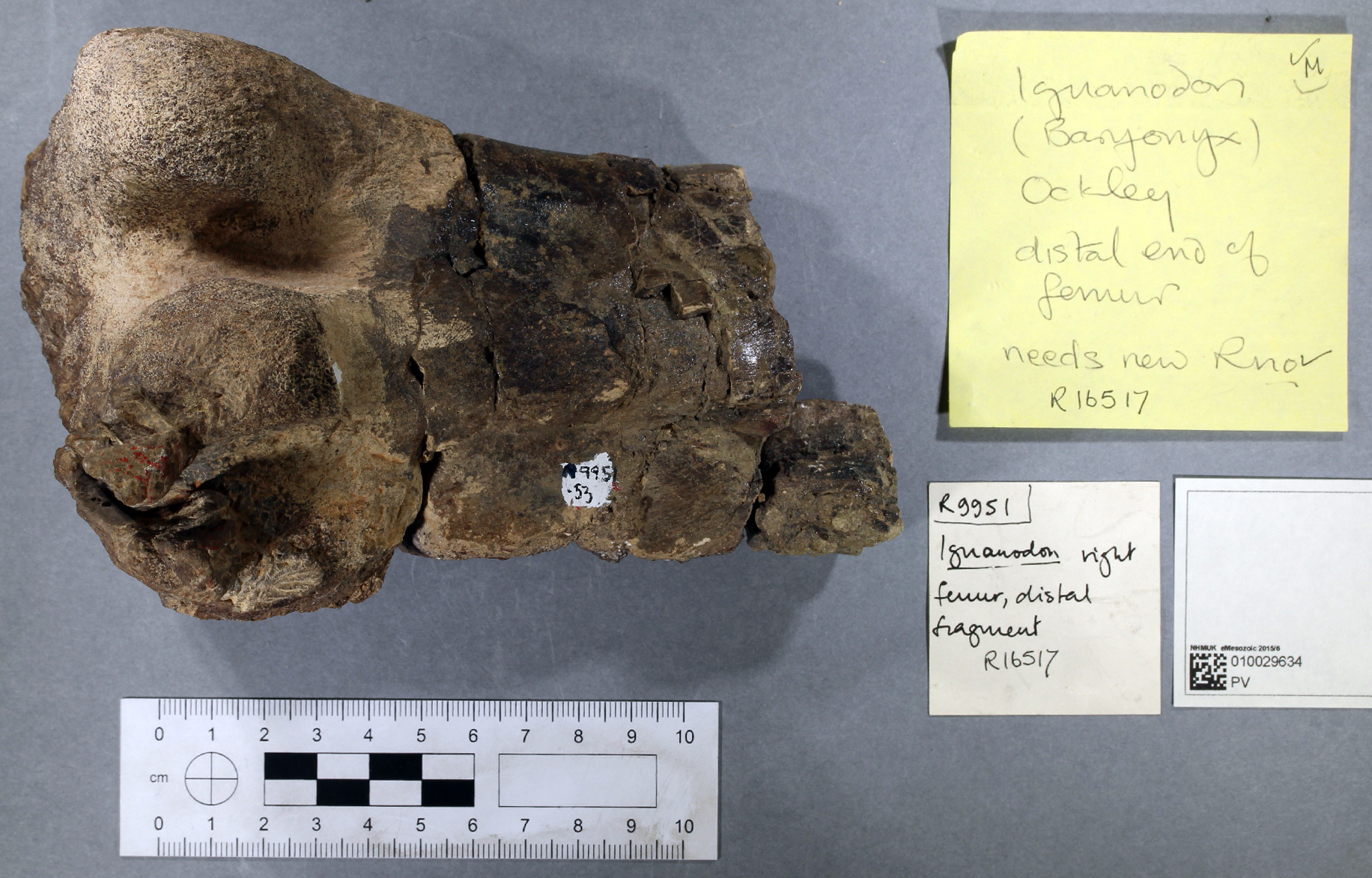
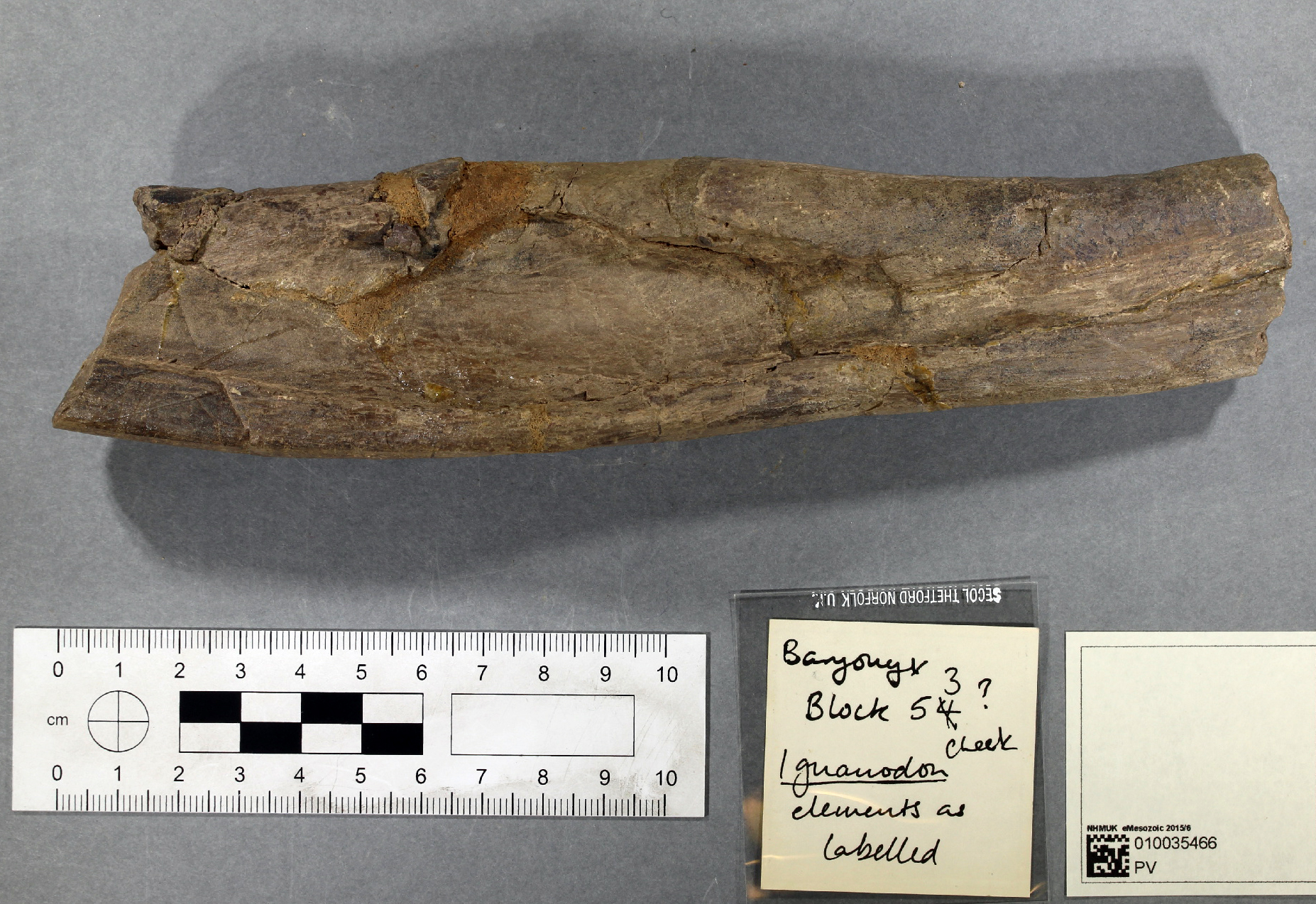
Abraded bones of a young iguanodontian found within the rib cage of the B. walkeri holotype

In 1997, Charig and Milner demonstrated direct dietary evidence in the stomach region of the B. walkeri holotype. It contained the first evidence of piscivory in a theropod dinosaur, acid-etched scales and teeth of the common fish Scheenstia mantelli (then classified in the genus Lepidotes), and abraded or etched bones of a young iguanodontian. They also presented circumstantial evidence for piscivory, such as crocodile-like adaptations for catching and swallowing prey: long, narrow jaws with their "terminal rosette", similar to those of a gharial, and the downturned tip and notch of the snout. In their view, these adaptations suggested that Baryonyx would have caught small to medium-sized fish in the manner of a crocodilian: gripping them with the notch of the snout (giving the teeth a "stabbing function"), tilting the head backwards, and swallowing them headfirst. Larger fish would be broken up with the claws. That the teeth in the lower jaw were smaller, more crowded and numerous than those in the upper jaw may have helped the animal grip food. Charig and Milner maintained that Baryonyx would primarily have eaten fish (although it would also have been an active predator and opportunistic scavenger), but it was not equipped to be a macro-predator like Allosaurus. They suggested that Baryonyx mainly used its forelimbs and large claws to catch, kill and tear apart larger prey. An apparent gastrolith (gizzard stone) was also found with the specimen. The palaeontologist Oliver Wings suggested in 2007 that the low number of stones found in theropods like Baryonyx and Allosaurus could have been ingested by accident. In 2004, a pterosaur neck vertebra from Brazil with a spinosaurid tooth embedded in it reported by Buffetaut and colleagues confirmed that the latter were not exclusively piscivorous.

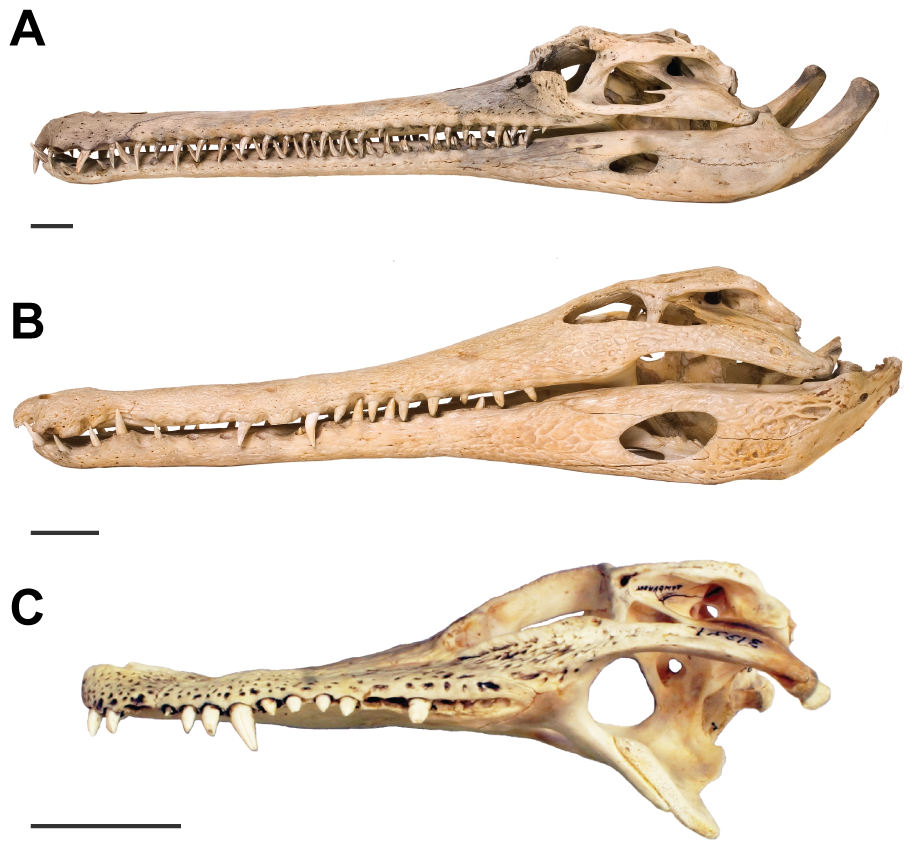
Video showing a CT scan 3D model of the holotype snout in rotation (left), and three skulls of extant crocodilians that were compared to those of spinosaurs in a 2013 study (right)

A 2005 beam-theory study by the palaeontologist François Therrien and colleagues was unable to reconstruct force profiles of Baryonyx, but found that the related Suchomimus would have used the front part of its jaws to capture prey, and suggested that the jaws of spinosaurids were adapted for hunting smaller terrestrial prey in addition to fish. They envisaged that spinosaurids could have captured smaller prey with the rosette of teeth at the front of the jaws, and finished it by shaking it. Larger prey would instead have been captured and killed with their forelimbs instead of their bite, since their skulls would not be able to resist the bending stress. They also agreed that the conical teeth of spinosaurids were well-developed for impaling and holding prey, with their shape enabling them to withstand bending loads from all directions. A 2007 finite element analysis of CT scanned snouts by the palaeontologist Emily J. Rayfield and colleagues indicated that the biomechanics of Baryonyx were most similar to those of the gharial and unlike those of the American alligator and more-conventional theropods, supporting a piscivorous diet for spinosaurids. Their secondary palate helped them resist bending and torsion of their tubular snouts. A 2013 beam-theory study by the palaeontologists Andrew R. Cuff and Rayfield compared the biomechanics of CT-scanned spinosaurid snouts with those of extant crocodilians, and found the snouts of Baryonyx and Spinosaurus similar in their resistance to bending and torsion. Baryonyx was found to have relatively high resistance in the snout to dorsoventral bending compared with Spinosaurus and the gharial. The authors concluded (in contrast to the 2007 study) that Baryonyx performed differently than the gharial; spinosaurids were not exclusive piscivores, and their diet was determined by their individual size.

In a 2014 conference abstract, the palaeontologist Danny Anduza and Fowler pointed out that grizzly bears do not gaff fish out of the water as was suggested for Baryonyx, and also ruled out that the dinosaur would not have darted its head like herons, since the necks of spinosaurids were not strongly S-curved, and their eyes were not well-positioned for binocular vision. Instead, they suggested the jaws would have made sideways sweeps to catch fish, like the gharial, with the hand claws probably used to stamp down and impale large fish, whereafter they manipulated them with their jaws, in a manner similar to grizzly bears and fishing cats. They did not find the teeth of spinosaurids suitable for dismembering prey, due to their lack of serrations, and suggested they would have swallowed prey whole (while noting they could also have used their claws for dismemberment).

A 2016 study by the palaeontologist Christophe Hendrickx and colleagues found that adult spinosaurs could displace their mandibular rami (halves of the lower jaw) sideways when the jaw was depressed, which allowed the pharynx (opening that connects the mouth to the oesophagus) to be widened. This jaw-articulation is similar to that seen in pterosaurs and living pelicans, and would likewise have allowed spinosaurids to swallow large prey such as fish and other animals. They also reported that some possible Portuguese Baryonyx fossils were found associated with isolated iguanodontian teeth, and listed it along with other such associations as support for opportunistic feeding behaviour in spinosaurs. Another 2016 study by the palaeontologist Romain Vullo and colleagues found that the jaws of spinosaurids were convergent with those of pike conger eels; these fish also have jaws that are compressed side to side (whereas the jaws of crocodilians are compressed from top to bottom), an elongated snout with a "terminal rosette" that bears enlarged teeth, and a notch behind the rosette with smaller teeth. Such jaws likely evolved for grabbing prey in aquatic environments with low light, and may have helped in prey detection.

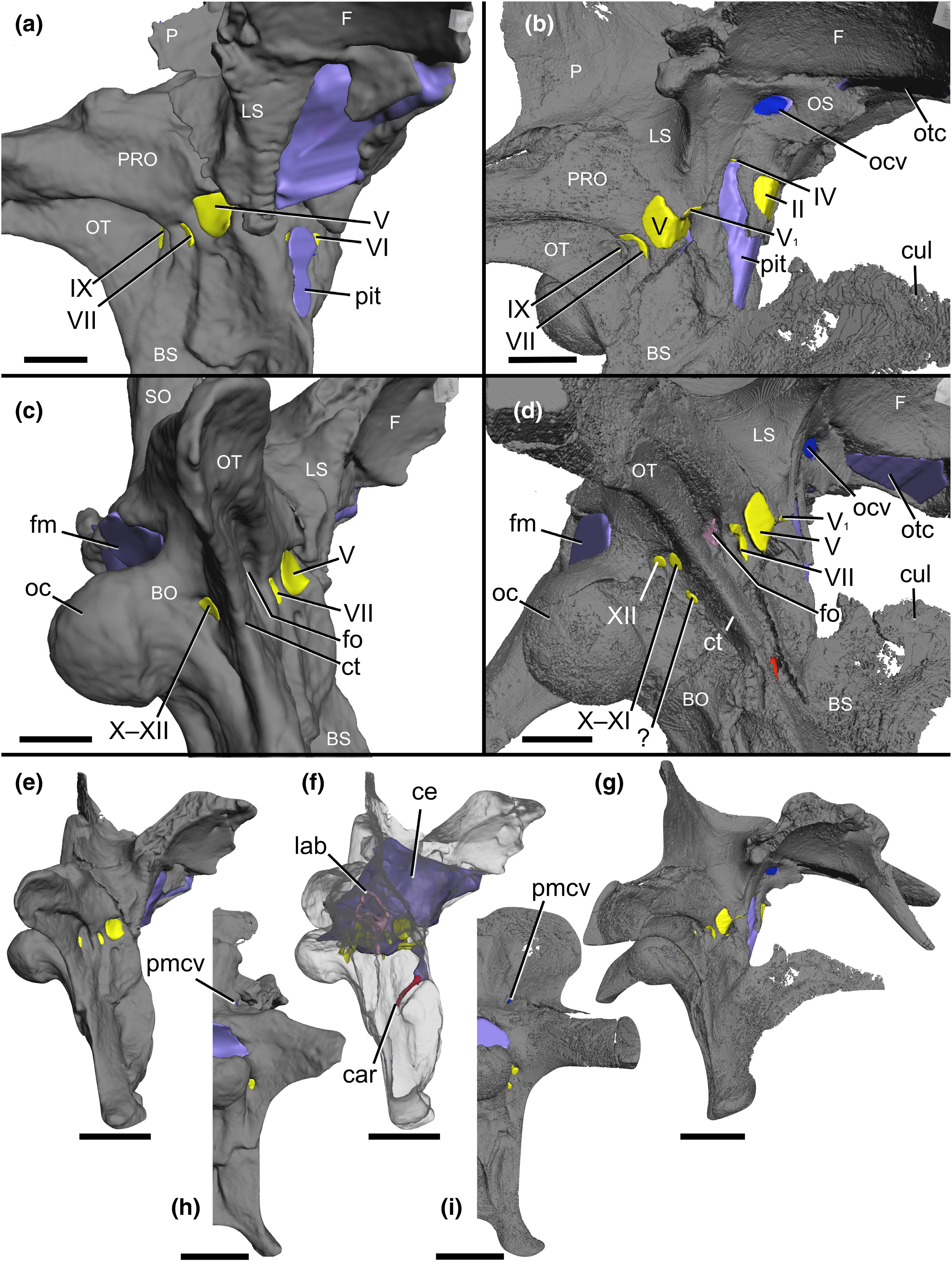
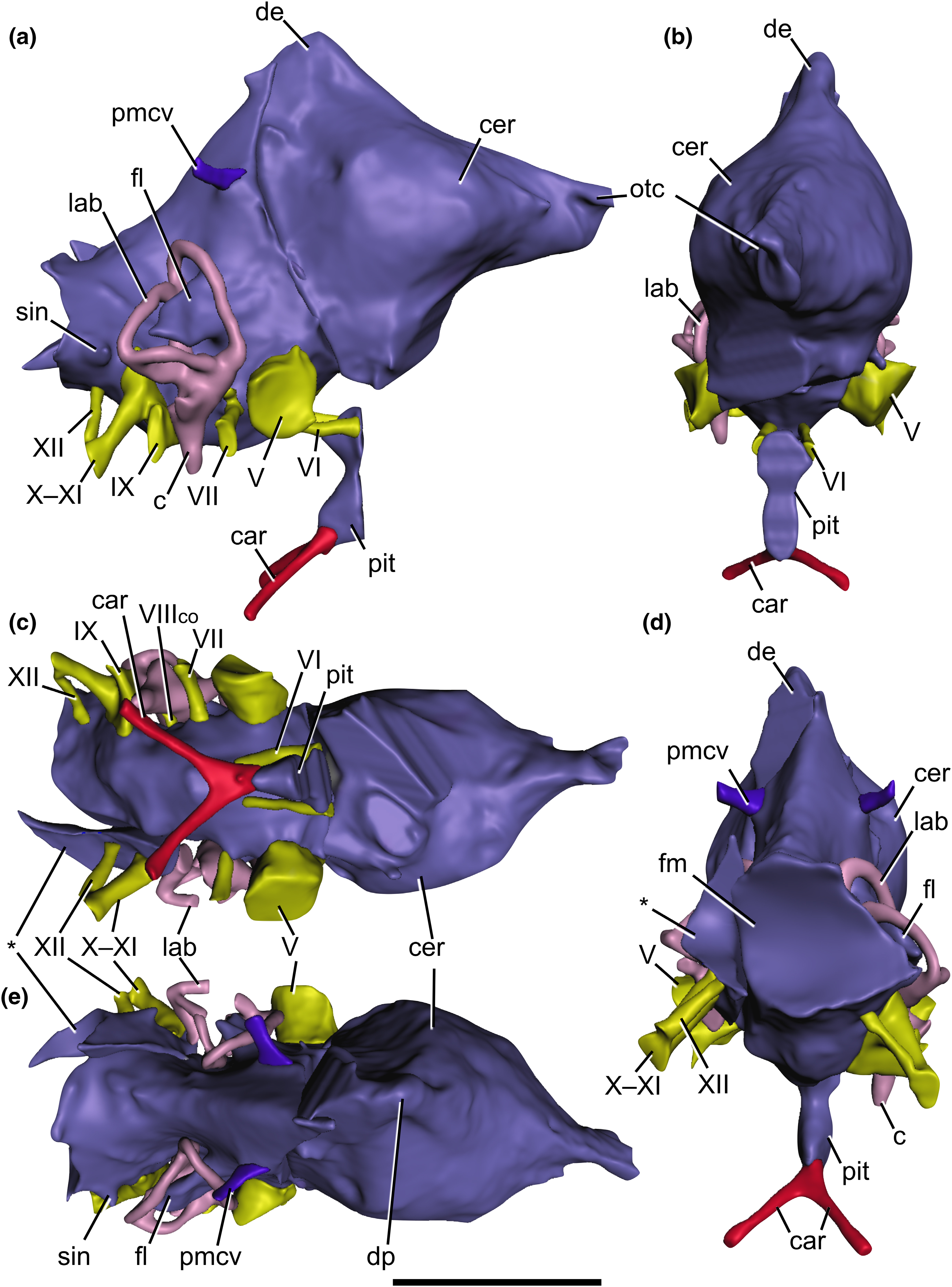
CT scan 3D models of the braincase of Baryonyx and Ceratosuchops (left), and 3D endocast of the brain of Baryonyx (right)

A 2023 study by Barker and colleagues based on CT scans of the braincases of Baryonyx and Ceratosuchops found that the brain anatomy of these baryonychines was similar to that of other non-maniraptoriform theropods. Their neurosensory capabilities such as hearing and olfaction (sense of smell) were unexceptional, and their gaze stabilisation less developed than those of spinosaurines, so their behavioural adaptations were probably comparable to those of other large-bodied terrestrial theropods. This suggests that their transition from terrestrial hypercarnivores to semi-aquatic "generalists" during their evolution did not require substantial modification of their brain and sensory systems. This could mean that spinosaurids were either pre-adapted for detection and capture of aquatic prey, or that their transition to semi-aquatic lifestyles only required modifications to the bones associated with the mouth. Their reptile encephalization quotient values imply that the cognitive capacity and behavioural sophistication of baryonychines did not deviate much from that of other basal theropods.

=== Motion and semi-aquatic habits ===
In their original description, Charig and Milner did not consider Baryonyx to be aquatic (due to its nostrils being on the sides of its snout—far from the tip—and the form of the post-cranial skeleton), but thought it was capable of swimming, like most land vertebrates. They speculated that the elongated skull, long neck, and strong humerus of Baryonyx indicated that the animal was a facultative quadruped, unique among theropods. In their 1997 article they found no skeletal support for this, but maintained that the forelimbs would have been strong enough for a quadrupedal posture and it would probably have caught aquatic prey while crouching—or on all fours—near (or in) water. A 2014 re-description of Spinosaurus by the palaeontologist Nizar Ibrahim and colleagues based on new remains suggested that it was a quadruped, based on its anterior centre of body mass. The authors found quadrupedality unlikely for Baryonyx, since the better-known legs of the closely related Suchomimus did not support this posture.

In 2017, the palaeontologists David E. Hone and Holtz hypothesized that the head crests of spinosaurids were probably used for sexual or threat display. The authors also pointed out that (like other theropods) there was no reason to believe that the forelimbs of Baryonyx were able to pronate (crossing the radius and ulna bones of the lower arm to turn the hand), and thereby make it able to rest or walk on its palms. Resting on or using the forelimbs for locomotion may have been possible (as indicated by tracks of a resting theropod), but if this was the norm, the forelimbs would probably have shown adaptations for this. Hone and Holtz furthermore suggested that the forelimbs of spinosaurids do not seem optimal for trapping prey, but instead appear similar to the forelimbs of digging animals. They suggested that the ability to dig would have been useful when excavating nests, digging for water, or to reach some kinds of prey. Hone and Holtz also believed that spinosaurids would have waded and dipped in water rather than submerging themselves, due to their sparsity of aquatic adaptations.

A 2010 study by the palaeontologist Romain Amiot and colleagues proposed that spinosaurids were semi-aquatic, based on the oxygen isotope composition of spinosaurid teeth from around the world compared with that of other theropods and extant animals. Spinosaurids probably spent much of the day in water, like crocodiles and hippopotamuses, and had a diet similar to the former; both were opportunistic predators. Since most spinosaurids do not appear to have anatomical adaptations for an aquatic lifestyle, the authors proposed that submersion in water was a means of thermoregulation similar to that of crocodiles and hippopotamuses. Spinosaurids may also have turned to aquatic habitats and piscivory to avoid competition with large, more-terrestrial theropods.

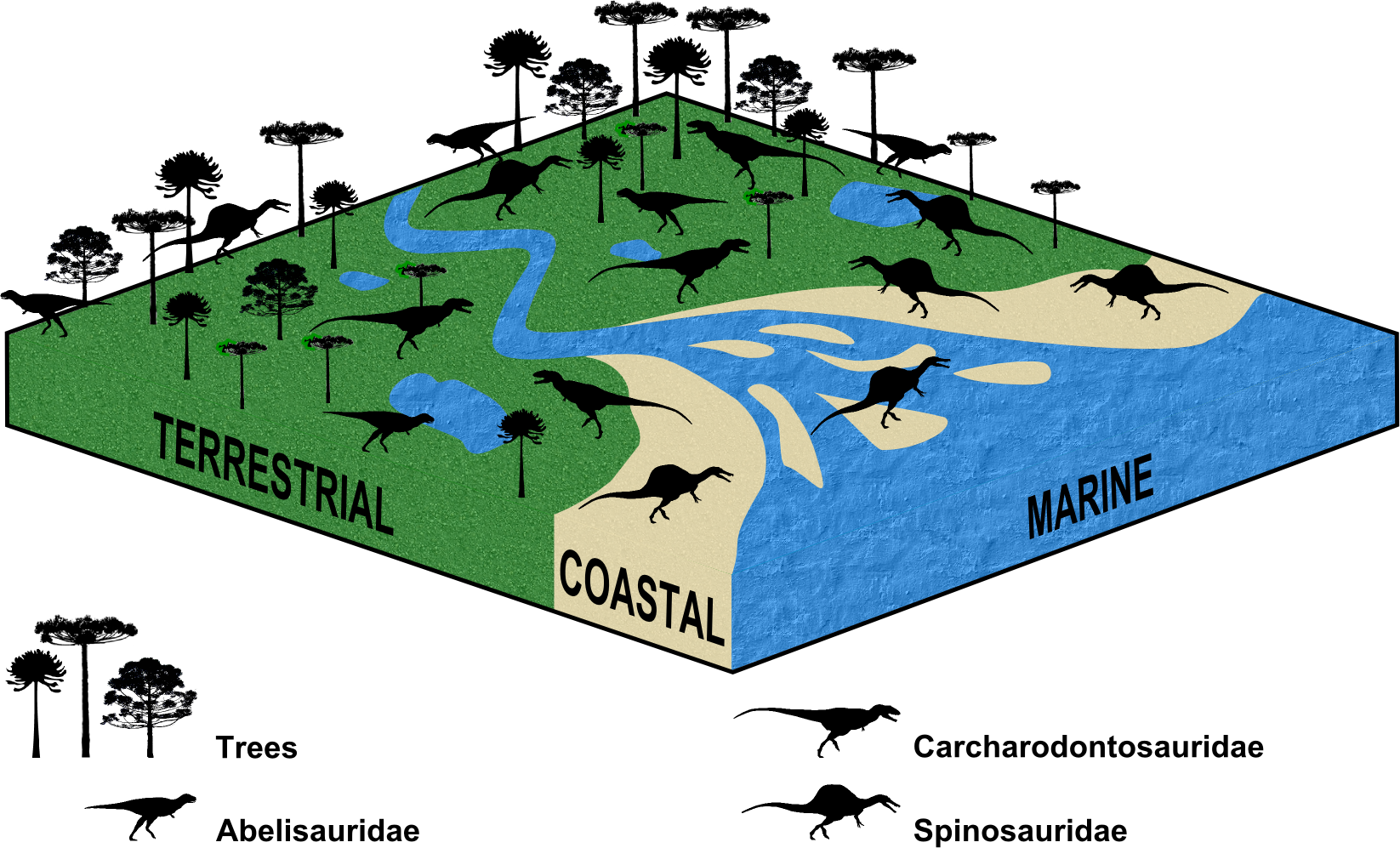
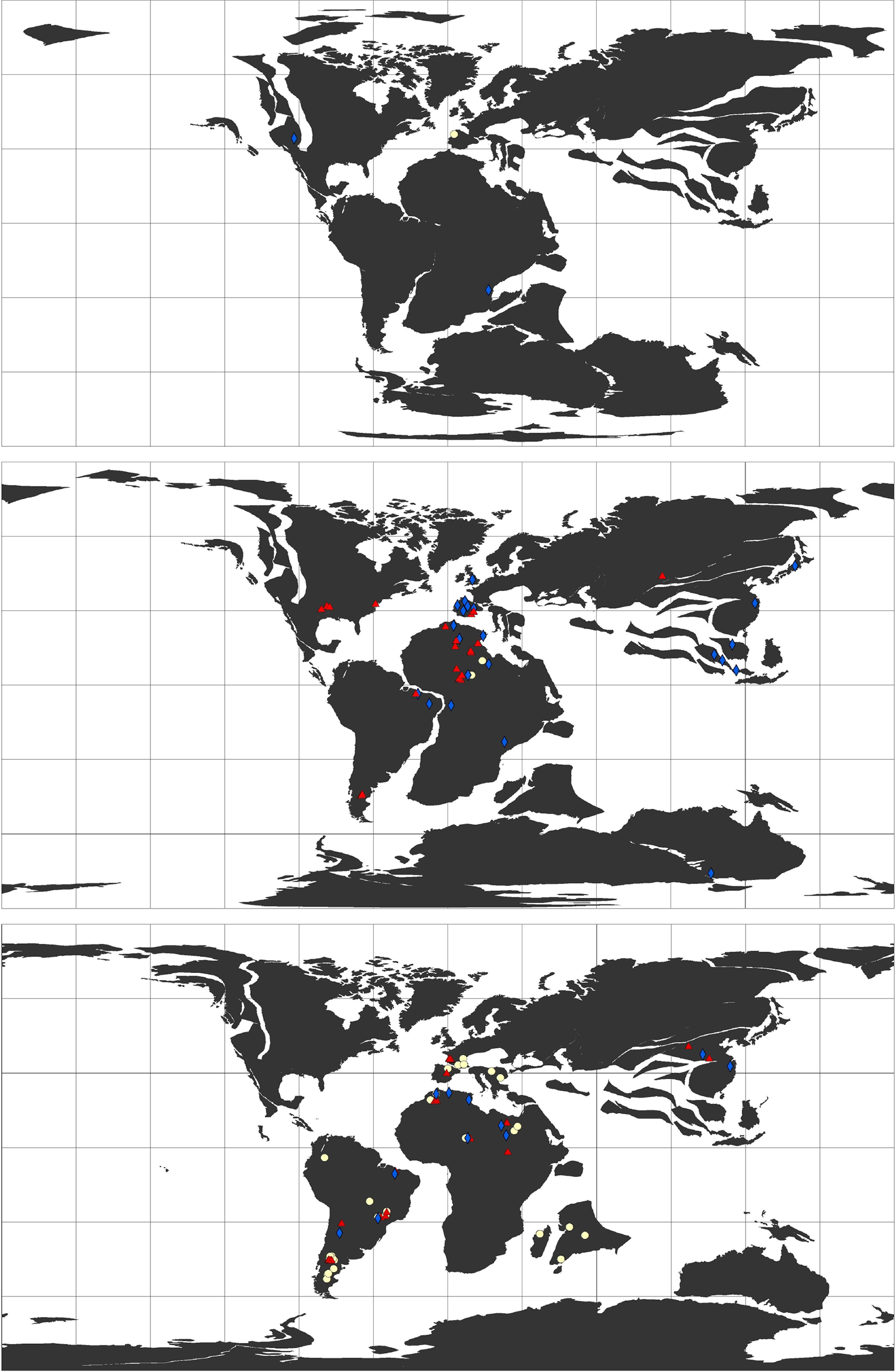
Spatial distribution of abelisaurids, carcharodontosaurids, and spinosaurids (the latter strongly associated with coastal environments), and their global occurrences through time (right)

In 2016, Sales and colleagues statistically examined the fossil distribution of spinosaurids, abelisaurids, and carcharodontosaurids, and concluded that spinosaurids had the strongest support for association with coastal palaeoenvironments. Spinosaurids also appear to have inhabited inland environments (with their distribution there being comparable to carcharodontosaurids), which indicates they may have been more generalist than usually thought. Sales and Schultz agreed in 2017 that spinosaurids were semi-aquatic and partially piscivorous, based on skull features such as conical teeth, snouts that were compressed from side to side, and retracted nostrils. They interpreted the fact that histological data indicates some spinosaurids were more terrestrial than others as reflecting ecological niche partitioning among them. As some spinosaurids have smaller nostrils than others, their olfactory abilities were presumably lesser, as in modern piscivorous animals, and they may instead have used other senses (such as vision and mechanoreception) when hunting fish. Olfaction may have been more useful for spinosaurids that also fed on terrestrial prey, such as baryonychines.

A 2022 study by the palaeontologist Matteo Fabbri and colleagues found that Baryonyx possessed dense bones that would have allowed it to dive underwater. This same adaptation was revealed in the related Spinosaurus, and they believed them to have been subaqueous foragers that dived after aquatic prey, while Suchomimus was better adapted to a non-diving lifestyle by comparison according to the provided analysis. This discovery also showcases the unique and ecologically disparate lifestyles spinosaurids had, with more hollow-boned genera preferring to hunt in shallower water. The scientist Nathan P. Myhrvold and colleagues reexamined the results of Fabbri and colleagues in 2024, finding problems with their methods. That study’s analysis required hard categorisation between aquatic behaviours (divers, waders, etc.), which is problematic because ecology hosts a wide array of animals with nuanced behaviours that do not fit into such confines. Furthermore, the study only recorded bone densities of each animal, whether that be the spinosaurids or modern day animals, by one point. Myhrvold and colleagues therefore concluded that the lifestyle of these spinosaurids was better covered by earlier studies.

== Palaeoenvironment ==
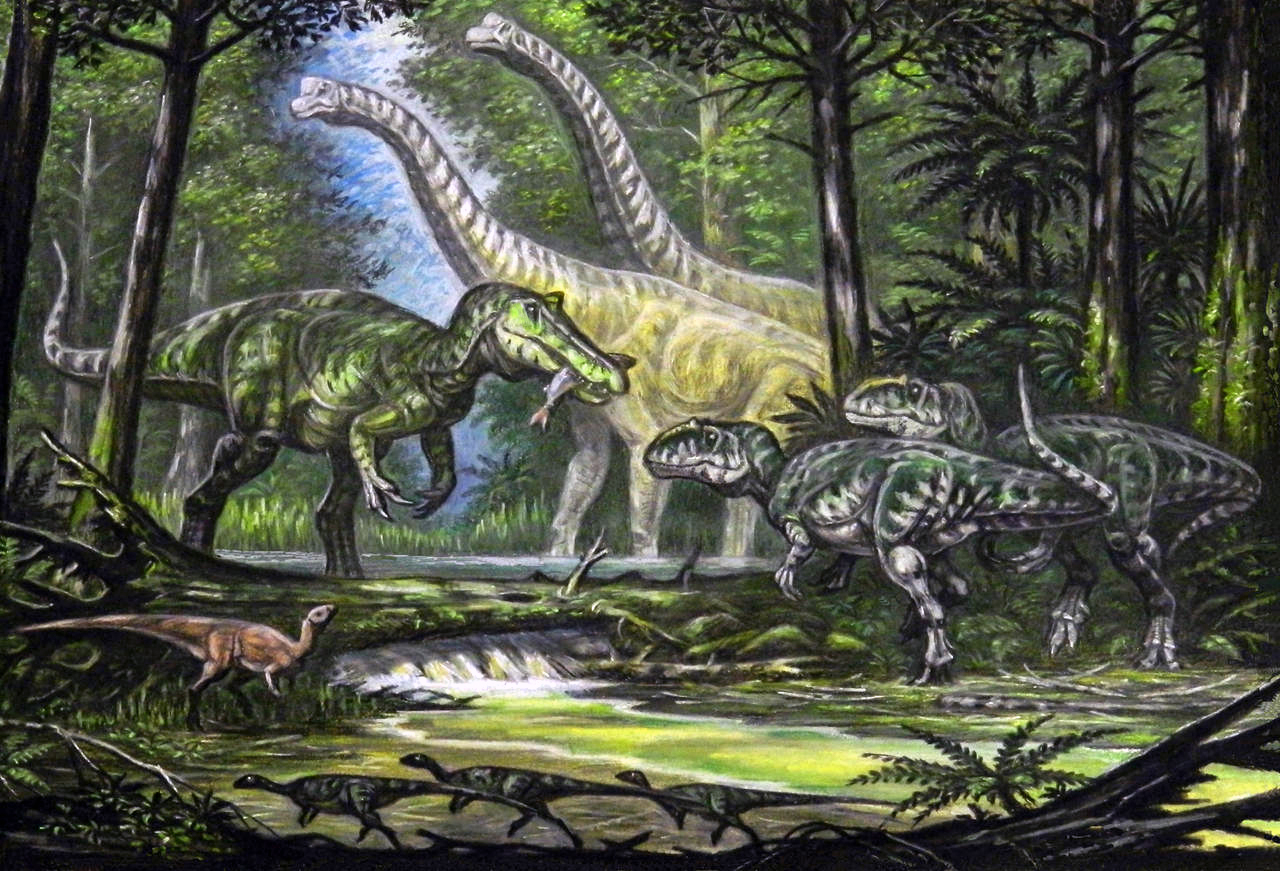
Restoration of Baryonyx with a fish (left) along contemporary dinosaurs of the Wessex Formation

The Weald Clay Formation consists of sediments of Hauterivian (Lower Weald Clay) to Barremian (Upper Weald Clay) age, about 130–125 million years old. The original Baryonyx specimen was found in the latter, in clay representing non-marine still water, which has been interpreted as a fluvial or mudflat environment with shallow water, lagoons, and marshes. During the Early Cretaceous, the Weald area of Surrey, Sussex, and Kent was partly covered by the large, fresh-to-brackish water Wealden Lake. Two large rivers drained the northern area (where London now stands), flowing into the lake through a river delta; the Anglo-Paris Basin was in the south. Its climate was sub-tropical, similar to the present Mediterranean region. Since the Smokejack Clay Pit consists of different stratigraphic levels, fossil taxa found there are not necessarily contemporaneous. Dinosaurs from the locality include the ornithopods Mantellisaurus, Paludohadros, and small sauropods. Other vertebrates from the Weald Clay include crocodiles, pterosaurs, lizards (such as Dorsetisaurus), amphibians, sharks (such as Hybodus), and bony fishes (including Scheenstia). Members of ten orders of insects have been identified, including Valditermes, Archisphex, and Pterinoblattina. Other invertebrates include ostracods, isopods, conchostracans, and bivalves. The plants Weichselia and the aquatic, herbaceous Bevhalstia were common. Other plants found include ferns, horsetails, club mosses, and conifers.

Other dinosaurs from the Wessex Formation of the Isle of Wight where Baryonyx may have occurred include the theropods Riparovenator, Ceratosuchops, Neovenator, Eotyrannus, Aristosuchus, Thecocoelurus, Calamospondylus, and Ornithodesmus; the ornithopods Brighstoneus, Hypsilophodon, and Valdosaurus; the sauropods Ornithopsis, Eucamerotus, and Chondrosteosaurus; and the ankylosaur Polacanthus. Barker and colleagues stated in 2021 that the identification of the two additional spinosaurids from the Wealden Supergroup, Riparovenator and Ceratosuchops, has implications for potential ecological separation within Spinosauridae if these and Baryonyx were contemporary and interacted. They cautioned that it is possible the Upper Weald Clay and Wessex Formations and the spinosaurids known from them were separated in time and distance.

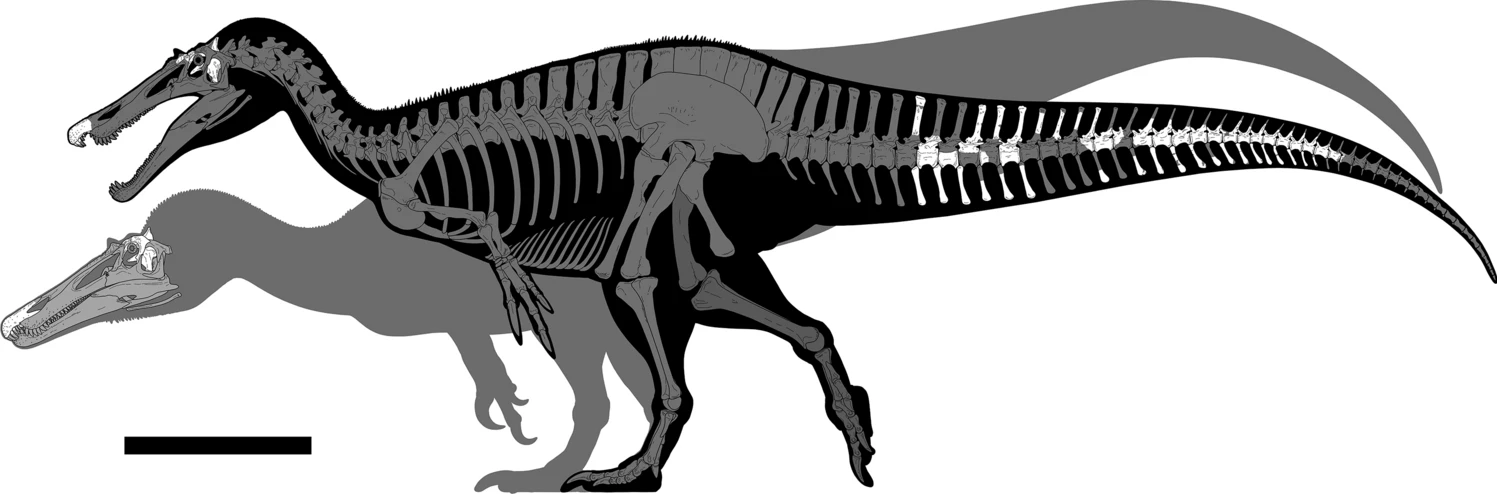
Diagram showing known material of Riparovenator (front) and Ceratosuchops (rear), spinosaurids from the Wessex Formation which may have lived alongside Baryonyx

It is generally thought that large predators occur with small taxonomic diversity in any area due to ecological demands, yet many Mesozoic assemblages include two or more sympatric theropods that were comparable in size and morphology, and this also appears to have been the case for spinosaurids. Barker and colleagues suggested that high diversity within Spinosauridae in a given area may have been the result of environmental circumstances benefiting their niche. While it has been generally assumed that only identifiable anatomical traits related to resource partitioning allowed for coexistence of large theropods, Barker and colleagues noted that this does not preclude that similar and closely related taxa could coexist and overlap in ecological requirements. Possible niche partitioning could be in time (seasonal or daily), in space (between habitats in the same ecosystems), or depending on conditions, and they could also have been separated by their choice of habitat within their regions (which may have ranged in climate).

=== Taphonomy ===
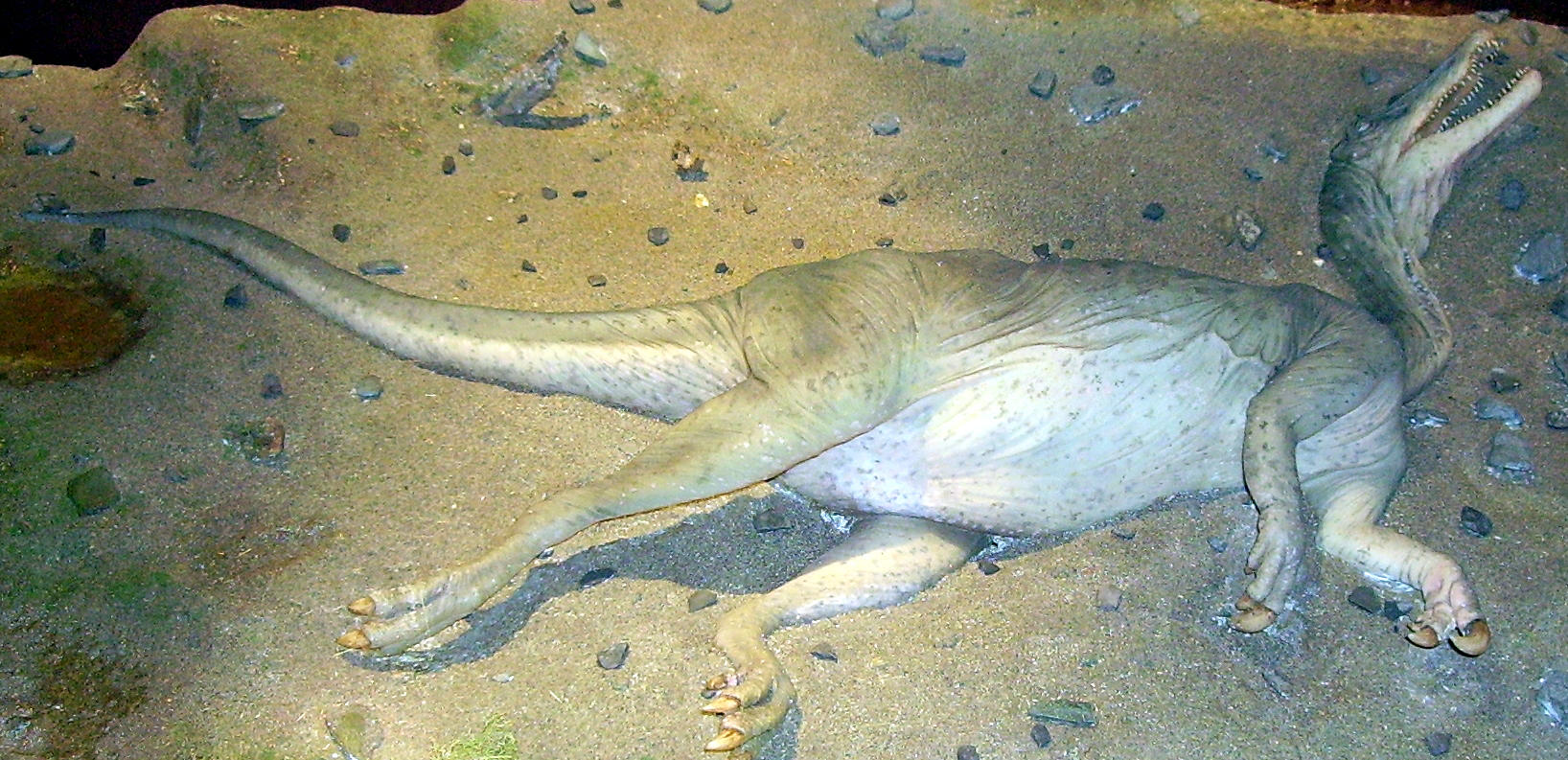
Model carcass based on the position of the holotype bones, NHM

Charig and Milner presented a possible scenario explaining the taphonomy (changes during decay and fossilisation) of the B. walkeri holotype specimen. The fine-grained sediments around the skeleton, and the fact that the bones were found close together (skull and forelimb elements at one end of the excavation area and the pelvis and hind-limb elements at the other), indicates that the environment was quiet at the time of deposition, and water currents did not carry the carcass far—possibly because the water was shallow. The area where the specimen died seems to have been suitable for a piscivorous animal. It may have caught fish and scavenged on the mud plain, becoming mired before it died and was buried. Since the bones are well-preserved and had no gnaw marks, the carcass appears to have been undisturbed by scavengers (suggesting that it was quickly covered by sediment).

The disarticulation of the bones may have been the result of soft-tissue decomposition. Parts of the skeleton seem to have weathered to different degrees, perhaps because water levels changed or the sediments shifted (exposing parts of the skeleton). The girdle and limb bones, the dentary, and a rib were broken before fossilisation, perhaps from trampling by large animals while buried. Most of the tail appears to have been lost before fossilisation, perhaps due to scavenging, or having rotted and floated off. The orientation of the bones indicates that the carcass lay on its back (perhaps tilted slightly to the left, with the right side upwards), which may explain why all the lower teeth had fallen out of their sockets and some upper teeth were still in place.
