= Wealden =

Wealden may refer to:

- Wealden District, a local government district in the county of East Sussex, England
- Wealden Group, a group of rock strata in southern England, occasionally also referred to as the Wealden Supergroup
- Wealden iron industry, was located in the Weald of south-eastern England.
- Wealden (UK Parliament constituency), East Sussex constituency in the British House of Commons
- Wealden hall house, is a type of vernacular medieval timber-framed hall house traditional in the south east of England.
- Wealden Lake, a lake that existed during the Cretaceous
- Wealden Line

== See also ==
- Weald (disambiguation)
