= Weald (disambiguation) =

The Weald is an intermittently wooded area in South East England.

Weald may also refer to:

== Places in England ==
- Lower Weald, Middle Weald and Upper Weald, hamlets in Calverton, Buckinghamshire
- Wealden District, East Sussex
- Harrow Weald, London, a suburb
- Weald, Oxfordshire, a village
- North Weald Bassett, a village in Essex
- South Weald in Essex
- Weald Country Park, Essex
- Kentish High Weald landscape area; see High Weald Landscape Trail
- Sevenoaks Weald, a village also known as Weald
- Weald of Kent Grammar School in Tonbridge
- Weald of Kent (UK Parliament constituency), a UK parliament constituency

== Literature ==
- The Weald, the fictional setting of Lois McMaster Bujold's The Hallowed Hunt

== See also ==
- Wield, Hampshire
- Wold (disambiguation)
- Wealden (disambiguation)
