= Smokejack Clay Pit =

Protected area in Surrey, England

Coordinates: 51.125°N 0.415°W

- Site of Special Scientific Interest
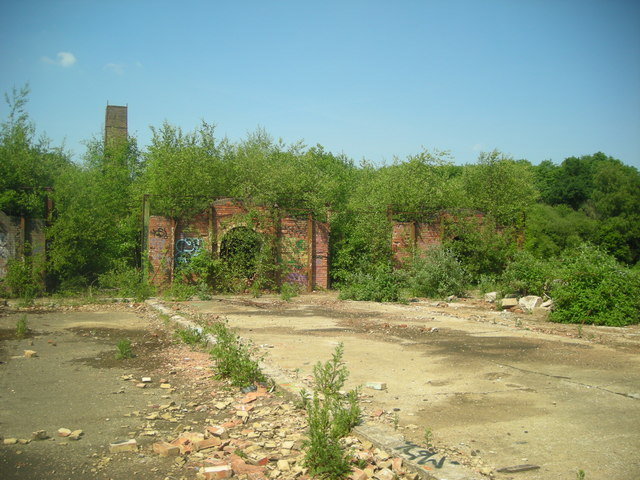
- Location of Smokejack Clay Pit.
- Area of search: Surrey
- Grid reference: TQ 110 374
- Interest: Geological
- Area: 56.0 hectares (138 acres)
- Notification date: 1992
- Location map: Magic Map

Smokejack Clay Pit is a 56-hectare (140-acre) geological Site of Special Scientific Interest east of Cranleigh in Surrey. It is a Geological Conservation Review site.

This site exposes Lower Cretaceous rocks of the Weald Clay Group, which have been studied since 1983. Fossils of six orders of insects have been recorded and an unusual level of details has been preserved. It is the best Weald Clay reptile site, with crocodile teeth, coprolites and part of an Iguanodon. The holotype specimen of the fish eating theropod dinosaur, Baryonyx walkeri was discovered on the site in January 1983.

== Ewhurst Brickworks ==
The ruins of Ewhurst Brickworks exist near the Smokejack Clay Pit, of which clay was extracted for the Ewhurst Brickworcks as early as the 1940s under A. Hone & Sons Ltd. The surviving ruins date back to the 1960s and were previously known as the Smokejack Brickworks, which closed down during the 1980s. The brickwork company moved to a new building in 2017 or 2018 which is 1 kilometre (0.62 mi) south of Walliswood.
