= Wealden Lake =

Wealden Lake was a shallow freshwater to brackish lake which existed over the lands of what is now northern France and southern England during the Berriasian to Barremian ages of the Early Cretaceous epoch (approximately 145 to 125 mya). The sediments that deposited at the bottom of the lake over the course of its 20 ma existence form the Wealden Supergroup, a stratigraphic unit that paints a complex picture of climate change, marine transgressions and regressions and geological processes.

== Palaeogeographical setting ==
Alluvial plains and deltas spread from the uplands surrounding the area where London now stands and eventually ran into this lake.
