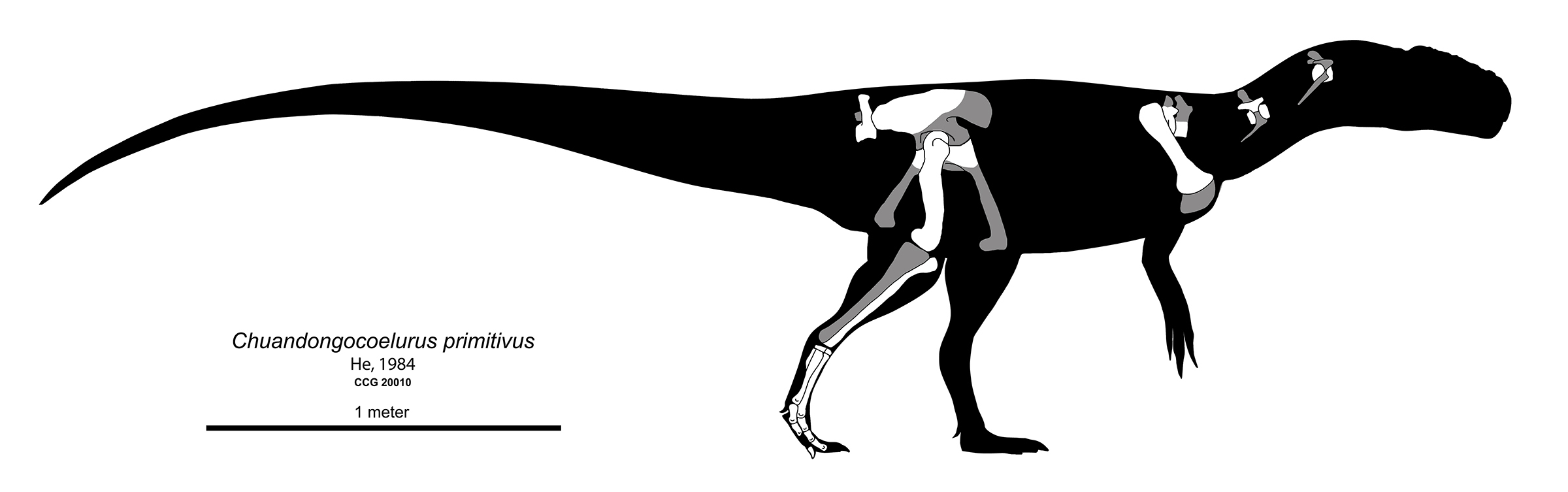
- Skeletal diagram showing known remains

Scientific classification
- Kingdom: Animalia
- Phylum: Chordata
- Class: Reptilia
- Clade: Dinosauria
- Clade: Saurischia
- Clade: Theropoda
- Genus: †Chuandongocoelurus; He, 1984
- Species: †C. primitivus

Binomial name
- †Chuandongocoelurus primitivus He, 1984

= Chuandongocoelurus =

Chuandongocoelurus Temporal range: Middle Jurassic, 165 Ma

Extinct genus of dinosaurs

Chuandongocoelurus (/tʃwɑːnˌdɒŋəsɪˈljʊərəs/ chwahn-DONG-ə-si-LURE-əs) is a genus of carnivorous tetanuran theropod dinosaur from the Jurassic of China.

== Discovery and naming ==
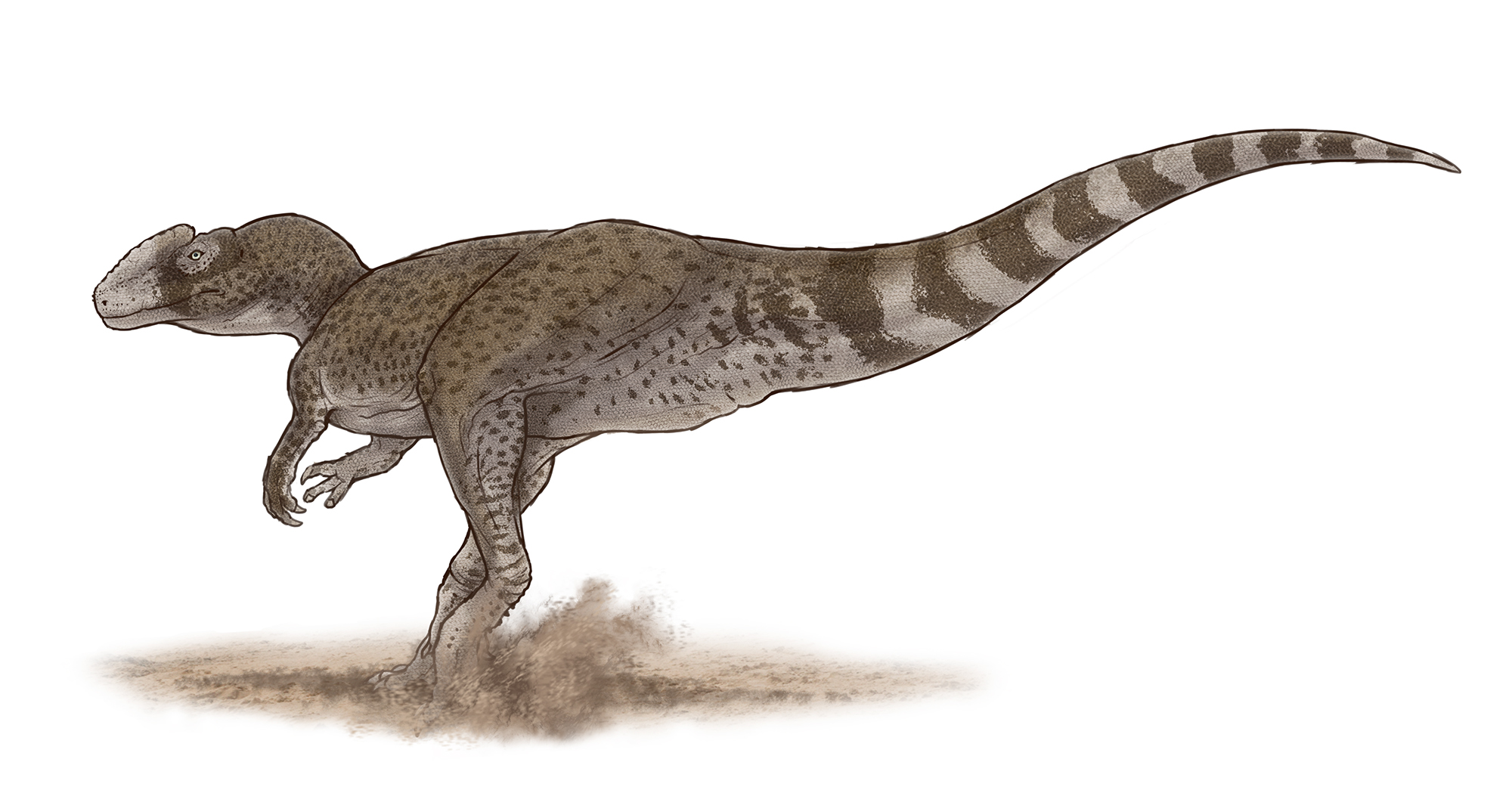
Life restoration of Chuandongocoelurus primitivus

The type species Chuandongocoelurus primitivus was first described and named by Chinese paleontologist He Xinlu in 1984. The generic name combines references to the Chuandong in Sichuan Province and the theropod genus Coelurus, itself named after the Greek κοῖλος, koilos, meaning "hollow" and οὐρά, oura, meaning "tail". The specific name means "the primitive one" in Latin, a reference to the great age of the find.

He assigned two partial skeletons to Chuandongocoelurus. The holotype, a thighbone, is part of specimen CCG 20010. Vertebrae, pelvic bones and hindlimb elements, also catalogued under this inventory number, may belong to the same individual. The specimen has unfused neurocentral sutures in its vertebrae, meaning that the animal was immature at the time of death. The second specimen, CCG 20011, is a set of neck vertebrae from a much larger individual. In 2012, it was concluded that both specimens represent different taxa, probably not even closely related. CCG 20011 was found to instead share similarities with the ceratosaur Elaphrosaurus. The formation in which it was discovered was the Lower Shaximiao Formation, meaning Chuandongocoelurus dates to the Bathonian or Callovian stage of the Middle Jurassic.

The holotype thighbone has a length of 201 millimetres.

== Classification ==
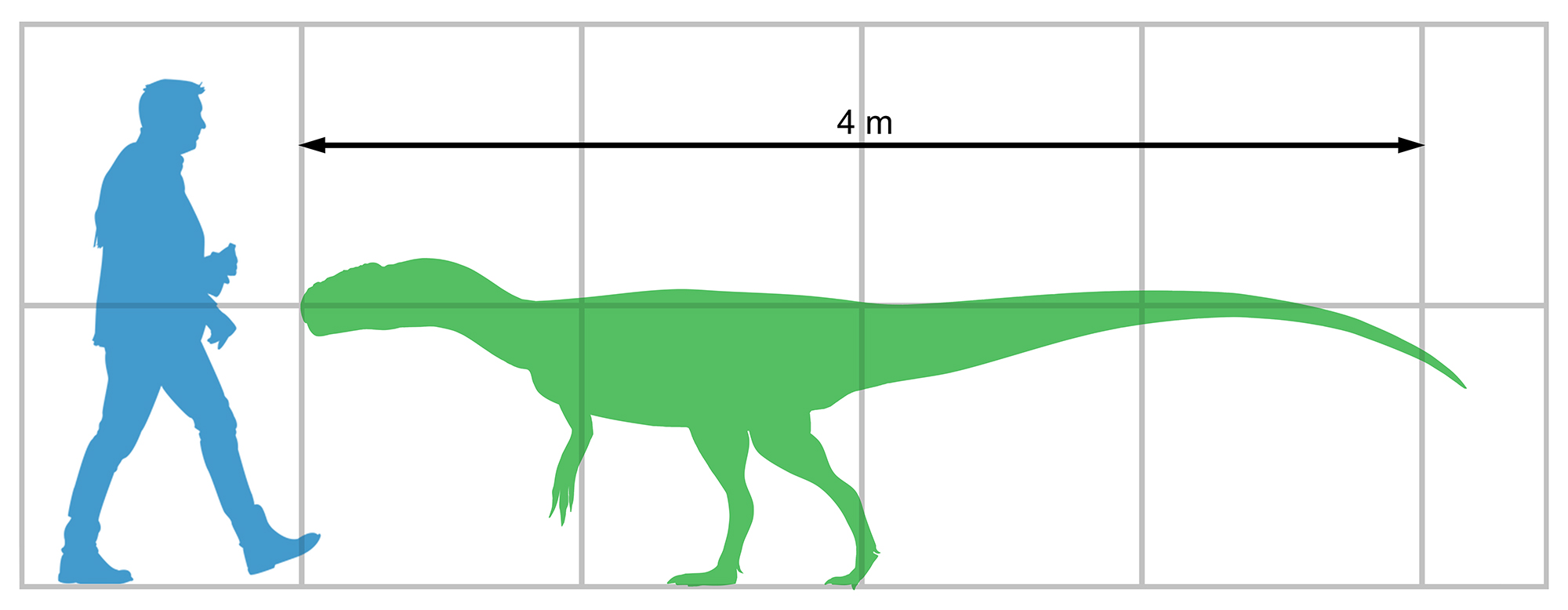
Size comparison of Chuandongocoelurus to a human

He placed Chuandongocoelurus in the Coeluridae, at the time a wastebasket taxon including almost all small theropods. David Bruce Norman in 1990 considered it to be an indeterminate theropod. More recently, Roger Benson (2008, 2010) and Benson et al. (2010) found it to be the sister taxon of Monolophosaurus, together forming a clade belonging either to Megalosauroidea or outside of Megalosauroidea in the Tetanurae. In 2012, Matthew Carrano et al. found Chuandongocoelurus outside of the Megalosauroidea.

The cladogram below follows Rauhut and Pol (2019):

- Averostra
  - Ceratosauria
  - Tetanurae
    - Chuandongocoelurus
    - - Coelurosauria
      - Carnosauria
        - Monolophosaurus
        - - Spinosauridae
          - - Megalosauridae
            - Allosauroidea
              - Xuanhanosaurus
              - - Piatnitzkysauridae
                - - Asfaltovenator
                  - - Metriacanthosauridae
                    - - Allosaurus
                      - Carcharodontosauria
