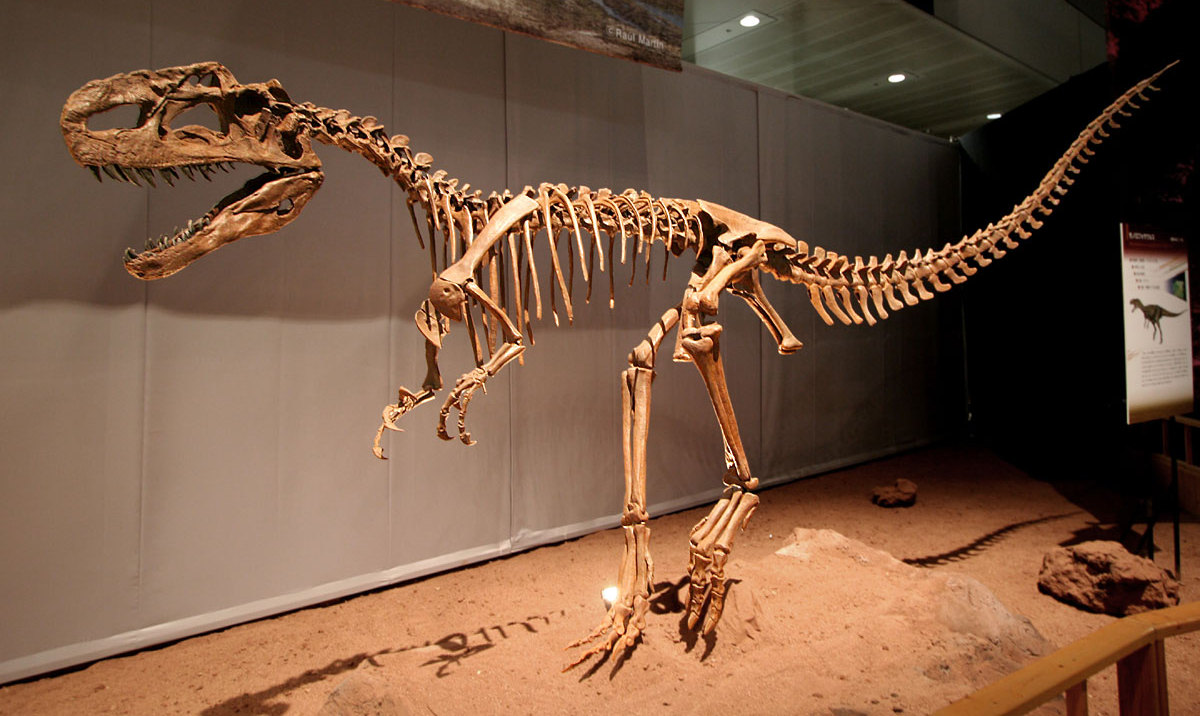
- Mounted skeleton in Japan

Scientific classification
- Kingdom: Animalia
- Phylum: Chordata
- Class: Reptilia
- Clade: Dinosauria
- Clade: Saurischia
- Clade: Theropoda
- Clade: Tetanurae
- Genus: †Monolophosaurus; Zhao & Currie 1993
- Species: †M. jiangi

Binomial name
- †Monolophosaurus jiangi Zhao & Currie 1993

= Monolophosaurus =

Monolophosaurus Temporal range: Middle Jurassic, 163–161 Ma

Extinct genus of dinosaurs

Monolophosaurus (/ˌmɒnoʊˌlɒfoʊˈsɔːrəs/ MON-oh-LOF-oh-SOR-əs; meaning "single-crested lizard") is an extinct genus of tetanuran theropod dinosaur from the Middle Jurassic Shishugou Formation in what is now Xinjiang, China. It was named for the single crest on top of its skull. Monolophosaurus was a mid-sized theropod at about 5–5.5 metres (16–18 ft) long and weighed 475 kilograms (1,047 lb).

== Discovery and naming ==
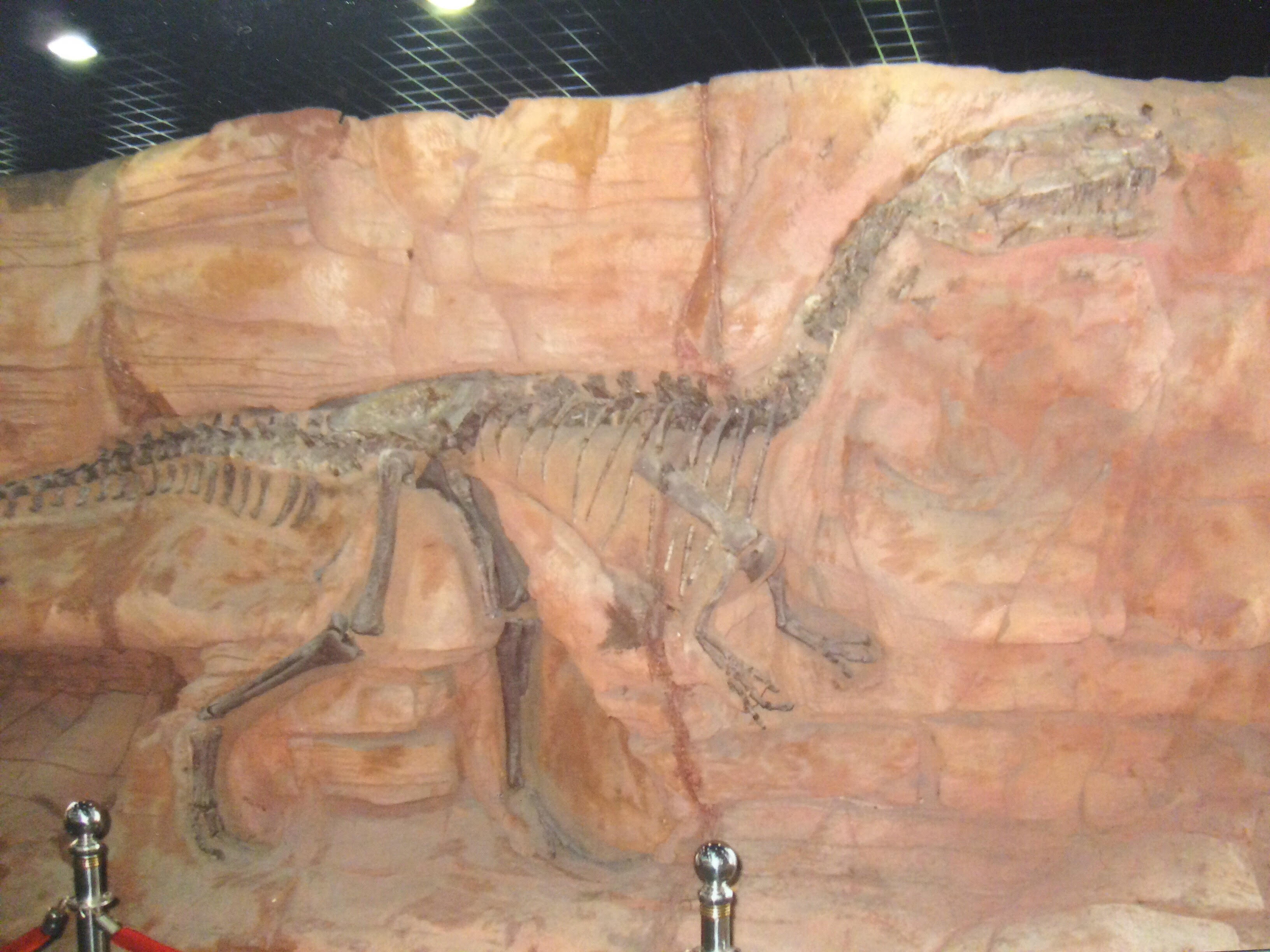
The restored holotype of M. jiangi, on display at the Paleozoological Museum of China

A nearly complete skeleton of a theropod new to science was discovered by Dong Zhiming in 1981, during stratigraphic exploration for the benefit of the oil industry. The fossil was not unearthed until 1984. In 1987, before description in the scientific literature, it was referred to in the press as Jiangjunmiaosaurus, an invalid nomen nudum. In 1992 it was mentioned by Dong Zhiming as Monolophosaurus jiangjunmiaoi, and in 1993 by Wayne Grady as Monolophosaurus dongi. These latter names also lacked a description and therefore were nomina nuda as well.

In 1993/1994, Zhao Xijin and Philip John Currie named and described the type species Monolophosaurus jiangi. The generic name is derived from Greek μόνος, monos, "single", λόφος or λόφη, lophos/lophè, "crest", and σαῦρος sauros, "lizard", in reference to the single crest on the snout. The specific name refers to Jiangjunmiao, an abandoned desert inn near which the fossil was found. Jiangjunmiao means "the temple (miao) of the general (jiangjun)"; local legend has it that a general was buried here.

The holotype IVPP 84019 was discovered in the Junggar Basin, in layers of the Wucaiwan Formation dating from the Bathonian-Callovian. It consists of a rather complete skeleton including the skull, lower jaws, vertebral column and pelvis. The rear of the tail, the shoulder girdle and the limbs are lacking. It represents an adult or subadult individual. The type specimen was restored with plaster to be used in a travelling exhibit. Its left side was encased in foam which has hindered subsequent study. A reconstruction was made of the missing elements to create casts of complete skeletal mounts. In 2010, two studies by Stephen Brusatte et al. redescribed the holotype, at the time still the only specimen known, in detail.

In 2006, Thomas Carr suggested that Guanlong, another theropod with a large, thin, and fenestrated midline crest and from the same formation, was in fact a subadult individual of Monolophosaurus. Usually Guanlong had been considered a proceratosaurid tyrannosauroid, but Carr had performed an analysis in which both specimens clustered and were allosauroids. More conservatively, in 2010 Gregory S. Paul renamed Guanlong into a Monolophosaurus species, Monolophosaurus wucaii, presuming the taxa might be sister species. In 2010, Brusatte et al. rejected the identity, pointing out that the Guanlong holotype was actually a fully adult individual.

== Description ==
Size comparison

The type and only known individual has been estimated at five metres (16.4 ft). In 2010, Paul estimated the length at 5.5 metres (18 ft) and the weight at 475 kilograms (1,047 lb).

Several distinguishing traits have been established. The snout on its midline bears a large crest, the front of which is formed by the praemaxillan. It continues to behind over the nasals and lacrimals; its rear touches the frontals. The top of the crest runs parallel to the upper jaw edge. The ascending branches of the praemaxillae each have a forked rear. The side of the praemaxilla features a deep groove running from an opening in the ascending branch towards an opening below the nostril. Within the depression around the upper rear side of the nostril two pneumatic openings are present, of unequal size. The rear branch of the lacrimal, above the eye socket, has a distinctive hatchet-shaped process pointing upwards. The combined frontals are rectangular and elongated with a length:width ratio of 1.67.

=== Skull ===
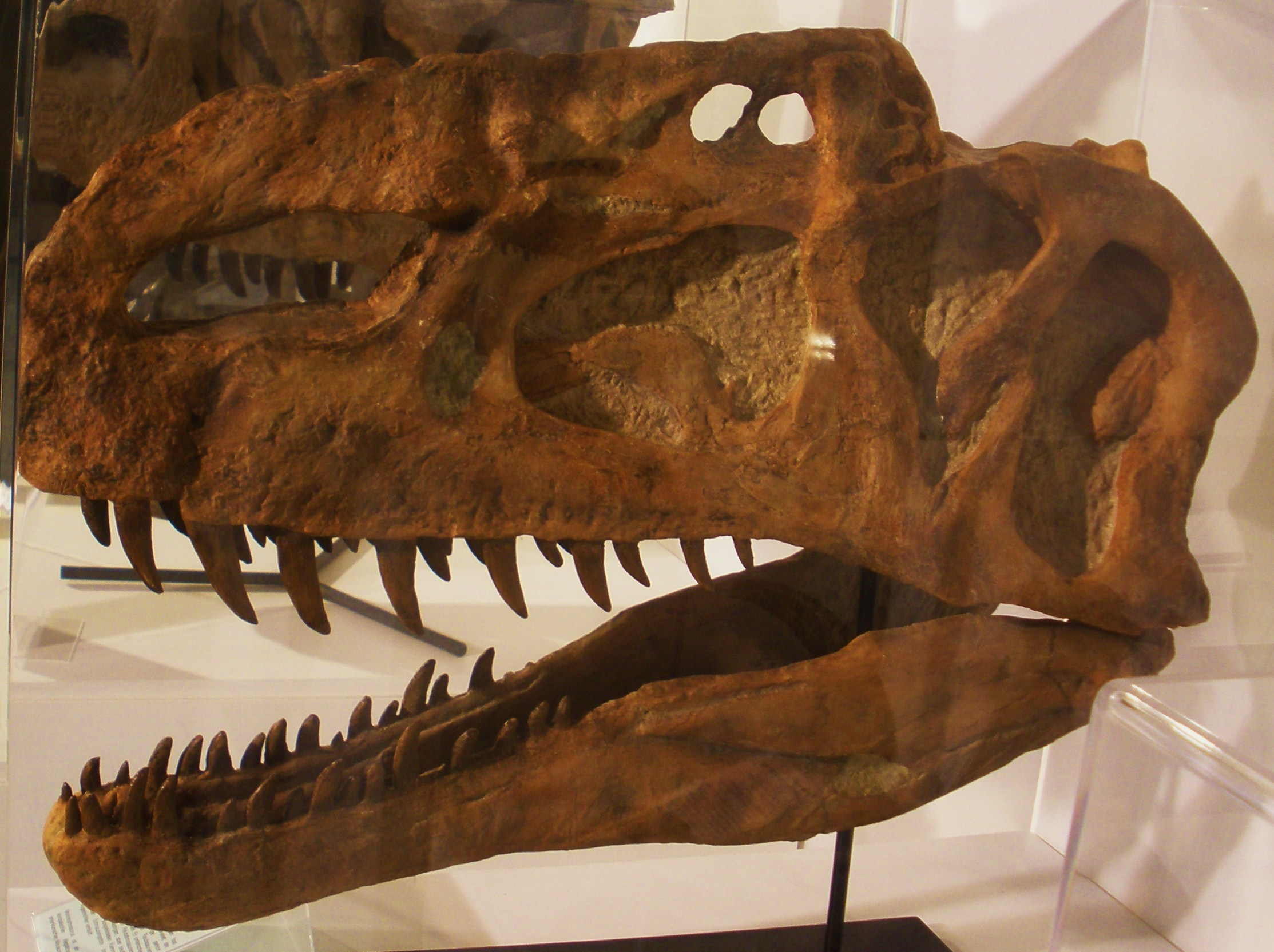
Profile view of skull cast

The holotype skull has a length of eighty centimetres. It is as such rather flat but this is obscured by the presence of a large snout crest occupying about three quarters of the skull length, reaching the level of the eye sockets. Sprouting from the praemaxillae at the snout tip, the crest is largely formed by the nasal bones. Transversely it has a triangular cross-section with a broad base and a more narrow top; this does not form a ridge, however, but has a flat upper surface. The nasal crest side is very rugose with a series of bosses and swellings. The nasal bone contributes to the upper rear part of the depression around the antorbital fenestra. This area shows a number of pneumatic openings or pneumatopores, where diverticula of the air sacs entered the bone. In the front two small foramina are present, more to the rear two large horizontal oval openings. CAT scans showed that internally the nasal bone is heavily pneumatised, with large air chambers. Also the jugal bone is pneumatised. The lacrimal is I-shaped. It has an ascending branch forming the vertical rear edge of the crest; due to the triangular cross-section this branch is inclined towards the midline of the skull. The upper outer side of this branch forms a rectangular boss. Behind the eye socket, on the postorbital another, smaller, horn is present. The frontal bones do not contribute to the crest; they are unique among Theropoda in having a combined rectangular instead of triangular shape, due to the posterior position of the crest rear.

The praemaxilla has a narrow ascending branch, forming the front of the crest. The rear of this branch is forked and embraces a lateral point of the nasal, a feature not recognised in the original description of 1994. At the base of the branch a small opening is present. A larger opening is located below the nostril. Both openings are connected by a distinct groove, curving around the underside of the nostril. The function of this unique trait is unknown. The praemaxilla bears four teeth. The maxilla bears thirteen teeth. The maxilla has a short depression around the lower front of the antorbital fenestra. Within this area a smaller hollowing is located, closed at the inside, perhaps representing the fenestra promaxillaris, of which it has the usual position, or the fenestra maxillaris, the normal identity of a single opening.

In the braincase, the channel of the nervus trigeminus, the fifth brain nerve, is not bifurcated. The palatine bone is pneumatised, as shown by the presence of a pneumatopore. In the lower jaw, the external mandibular fenestra is rather small for a basal tetanuran. The holotype shows eighteen teeth in the right dentary, seventeen in the left dentary; such an asymmetry is not rare among large theropods. A row of foramina is present below and on the outer side of the tooth row. These openings are relatively large below the first four teeth; more to behind, they become smaller and their row curves downwards. From the ninth tooth onwards, the foramina merge into a groove. A second row of openings runs parallel to the lower jaw edge and ends at the thirteenth tooth position, which is exceptionally far. At the inside of the dentary, the Meckelian groove at the level of the third tooth extends to the front into two superimposed narrow slits. The rear of the lower jaw shows a unique combination of a kinked suture between the angular and the surangular, and the basal trait of the surangular reaching the rear jaw edge. The rather small foramen surangulare posterior is not overhung by a thick bone shelf, which is rare among large theropods.

=== Postcranial skeleton ===
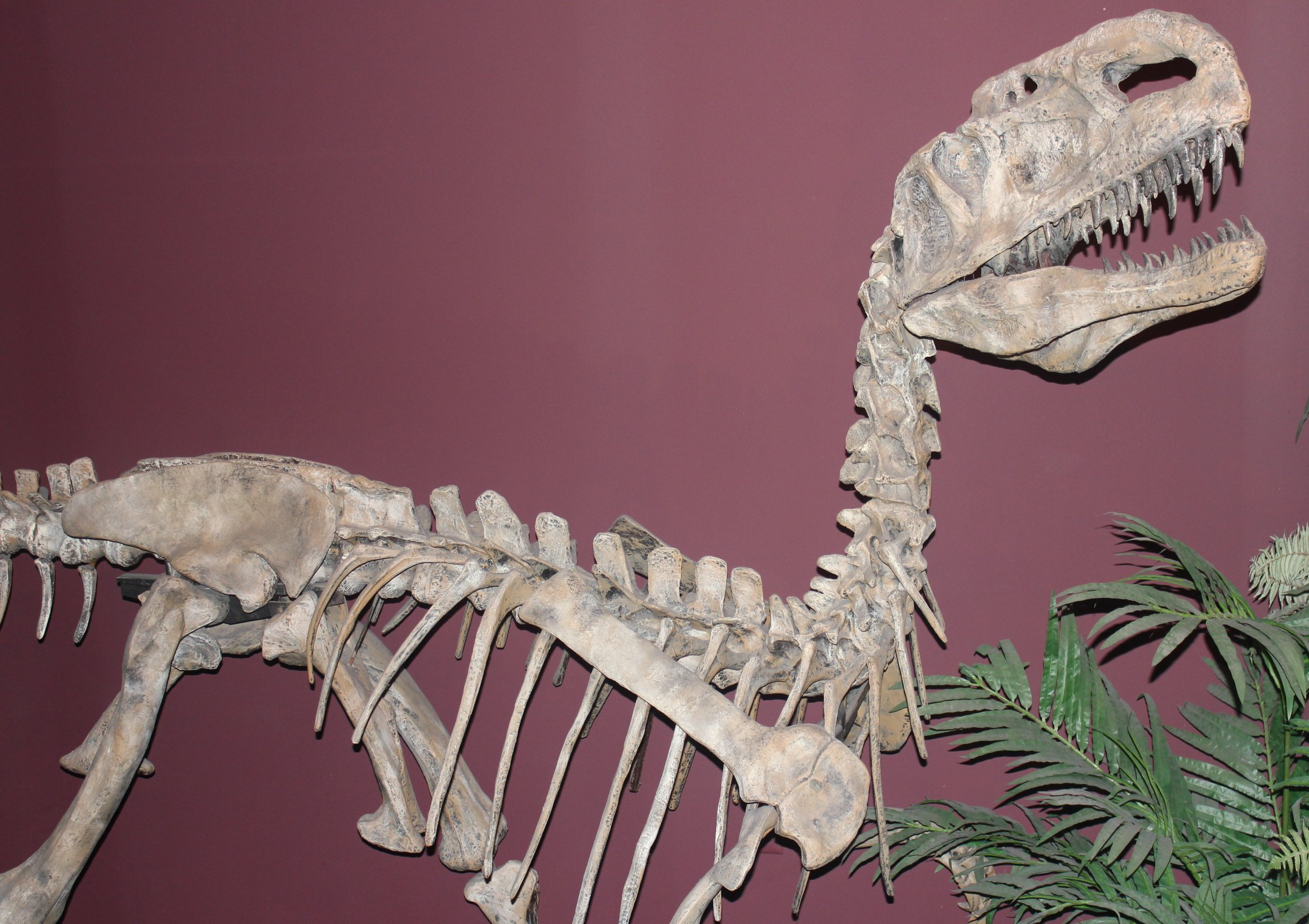
Mounted skeleton at the Milwaukee Public Museum, clearly showing the hood-shaped antitrochanter above the hip joint

The vertebral column consists of nine cervical vertebrae, fourteen dorsals and five sacrals. The number of tail vertebrae is unknown. The cervical vertebrae of the neck are strongly pneumatised. They possess pleurocoels at their sides and their insides are hollowed out by large air chambers. The neural spines of the cervical vertebrae are narrow in side view and decreased in width towards the rear: those of the eighth and ninth vertebrae were rod-like. At least the first three dorsal vertebrae of the back have pleurocoels as well. The dorsals are connected by robust hyposphene-hypantrum complexes. From the sixth vertebra onwards the neural spines abruptly become wider. The neural spines of the sacral vertebrae are not fused into a supraneural plate. The tail base is slightly oriented downwards. The caudal vertebrae of the tail base also show hyposphene-hypantrum complexes.

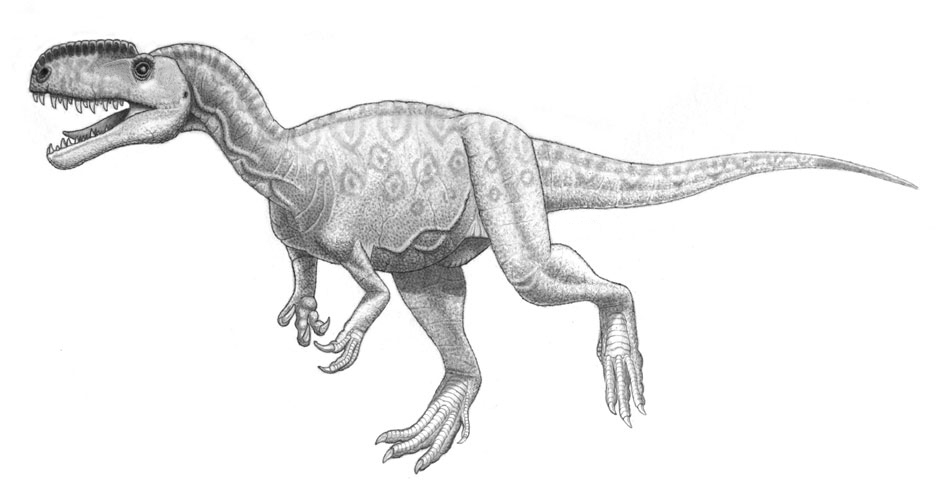
Restoration

In the pelvis, the ilium has a slightly convex upper profile. Its front blade has a pending, hook-shaped point. The edge of the base of the front blade is incised by a groove. The ilium has some basal traits. The process to which the pubic bone is attached, has two facets, one directed to below, the other obliquely pointing to the front, instead of a single facet. Also basal is the fact that the hip joint is overhung by a hood-shaped extension of the antitrochanter; the front of this hood reaches further to below and to the outer side. There is no clear brevis shelf. The pubic bones and the ischia resemble each other in having a "foot" and being per pair connected via bony skirts, pierced by a foramen.

== Classification ==
Monolophosaurus was originally termed a "megalosaur" and has often since been suggested to be an allosauroid. Smith et al. (2007) was the first publication to find Monolophosaurus to be a non-neotetanuran tetanuran, by noting many characters previously thought to be exclusive of Allosauroidea to have a wider distribution. Also, Zhao et al. (2010) noted various primitive features of the skeleton suggesting that Monolophosaurus could be one of the most basal tetanuran dinosaurs instead. Benson (2008, 2010) placed Monolophosaurus in a clade with Chuandongocoelurus that is more basal than Megalosauridae and Spinosauridae in the Megalosauroidea. Later, Benson et al. (2010) found the Chuandongocoelurus/Monolophosaurus clade to be outside of Megalosauroidea and Neotetanurae, near the base of Tetanurae. A 2012 phylogeny found Monolophosaurus and Chuandongocoelurus, while not sister taxa, to form a group outside more derived groups at the base of Tetanurae.

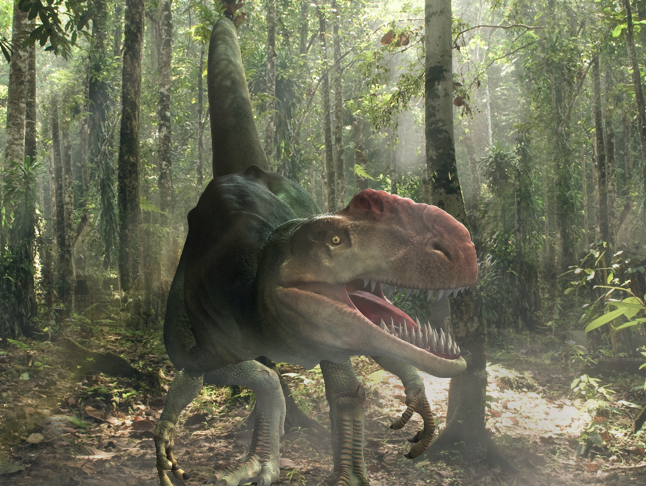
Digital restoration

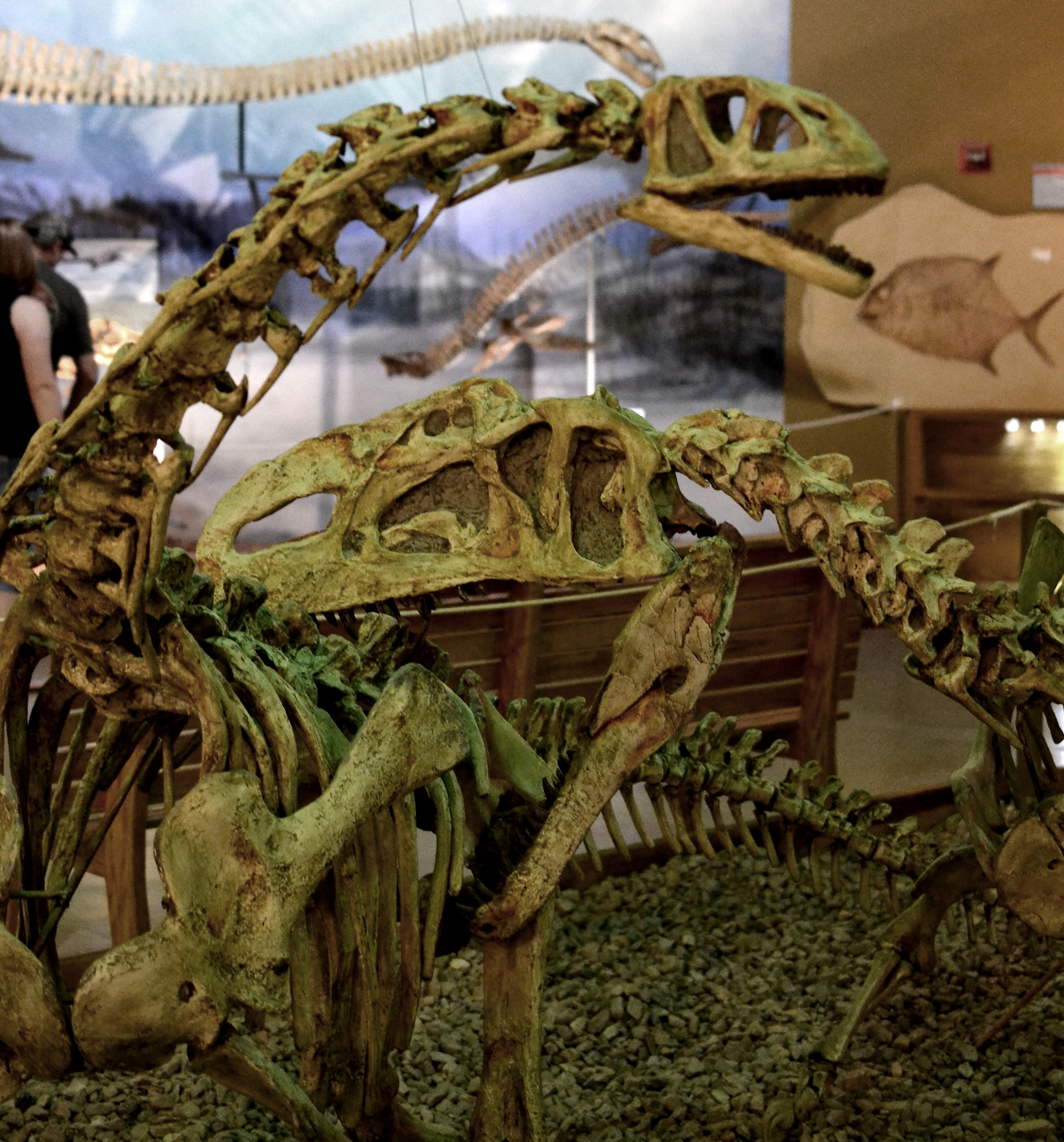
Mounted skeleton of a Monolophosaurus attacking a Bellusaurus, Wyoming Dinosaur Center. The two taxa are from the same formation.

The following cladogram is based on the phylogenetic analysis conducted by Carrano in 2012, showing the relationships of Monolophosaurus:

- Neotheropoda
  - Coelophysoidea
    - Dilophosaurus
    - - Coelophysis bauri
      - Coelophysis rhodesiensis
  - Averostra
    - Ceratosauria
      - Elaphrosaurus
      - - Ceratosaurus
        - - Majungasaurus
          - Masiakasaurus
    - Tetanurae
      - Cryolophosaurus
      - Sinosaurus
      - - Chuandongocoelurus
        - - Monolophosaurus
          - Orionides
            - Megalosauroidea
            - Avetheropoda

In 2019, Rauhut found Monolophosaurus to be the most basal member of Carnosauria.

- Tetanurae
  - - Chuandongocoelurus
    - - Coelurosauria
      - Carnosauria
        - Monolophosaurus
        - - Spinosauridae
          - - Megalosauridae
            - Allosauroidea
              - Piatnitzkysauridae
              - - Asfaltovenator
                - - Metriacanthosauridae
                  - Allosauria
                    - Allosauridae
                    - Carcharodontosauria
                      - Neovenatoridae
                        - Neovenator
                        - Chilantaisaurus
                      - Carcharodontosauridae
                        - Eocarcharia
                        - Concavenator
                        - Acrocanthosaurus
                        - Carcharodontosaurinae

A 2023 examination of Irritator challengeri found Monolophosaurus to be a sister taxon to Spinosauridae as part of a larger, monophyletic Carnosauria. Similarly, the describers of Alpkarakush included Monolophosaurus within Spinosauridae based on their phylogenetic analysis in 2024.

Cau (2024) recovered Monolophosaurus as a basal member of Allosauroidea. A simplified version of the cladogram is shown below.

- Allosauroidea
  - Monolophosaurus
  - - Metriacanthosauridae
    - - Lourinhanosaurus
      - Aorun
      - - Allosaurus
        - Carcharodontosauridae

== Paleobiology ==
The type specimen (IVPP 84019) had its tenth and possibly eleventh neural spines fractured. They are fused together. A series of parallel ridges on one of the specimen's dentaries may represent tooth marks.

== Paleoecology ==
Monolophosaurus lived in an area with a warm, semi-arid and highly seasonal climate. There were many wetlands and well-drained distal floodplains. The general area in China was home to many types of conifers, ginkgos and ferns. It coexisted with smaller dinosaurs such as Hualianceratops, Yinlong, Aorun and Guanlong. It also lived alongside much larger dinosaurs such as Sinraptor, Mamenchisaurus, Klamelisaurus and Jiangjunosaurus.
