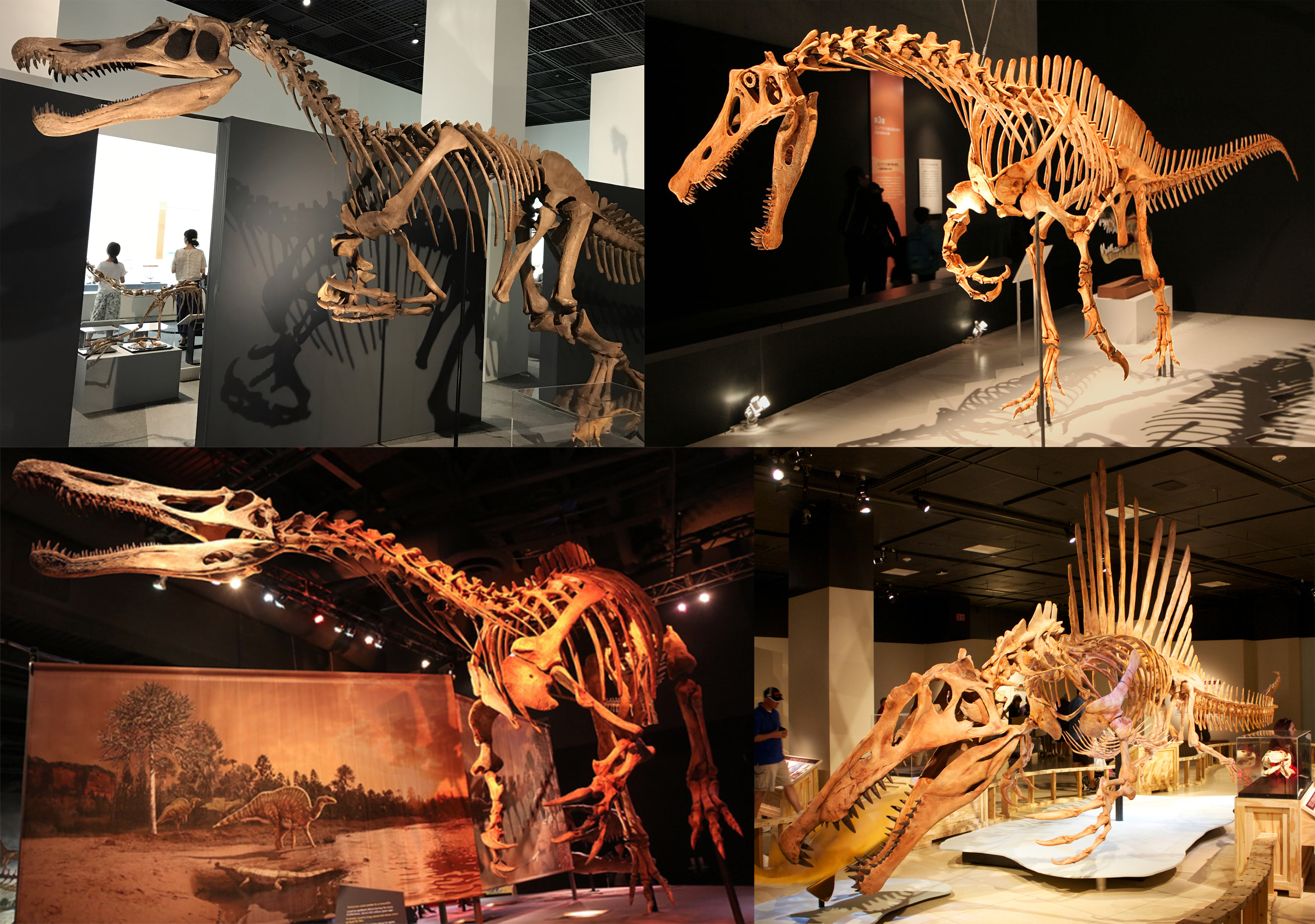
- Montage of four spinosaurids, clockwise from top left: Baryonyx, Irritator, Spinosaurus and Suchomimus

Scientific classification
- Kingdom: Animalia
- Phylum: Chordata
- Class: Reptilia
- Clade: Dinosauria
- Clade: Saurischia
- Clade: Theropoda
- Clade: †Carnosauria (?)
- Superfamily: †Megalosauroidea
- Family: †Spinosauridae; Stromer, 1915

Type species
- †Spinosaurus aegyptiacus Stromer, 1915

Subgroups and genera
- †Cristatusaurus; †Iberospinus; †Monolophosaurus?; †Ostafrikasaurus?; †Spinosauria Olshevsky, 1991; †Baryonychinae; †Baryonyx; †Cristatusaurus?; †Eocarcharia?; †Iberospinus?; †Protathlitis?; †Riojavenatrix; †Suchosaurus; †Ceratosuchopsini; †Ceratosuchops; †Eocarcharia?; †Riparovenator; †Suchomimus; †Spinosaurinae; †Camarillasaurus?; †Iberospinus?; †Ichthyovenator; †Irritator; †Siamosaurus?; †Vallibonavenatrix; †Spinosaurini; †Oxalaia*; †Sigilmassasaurus*; †Spinosaurus; *disputed validity; =Spinosaurus?

Synonyms
- Baryonychidae Charig & Milner, 1986; Irritatoridae Martill et al., 1996; Sigilmassasauridae Russell, 1996

= Spinosauridae =

Spinosaurids Temporal range: Early Cretaceous–Late Cretaceous (Berriasian–Cenomanian), 140–94 Ma Possible Bathonian record

Family of dinosaurs

Spinosauridae (or spinosaurids) is a clade or family of tetanuran theropod dinosaurs comprising ten to seventeen known genera. Spinosaurid fossils have been recovered worldwide, including Africa, Europe, South America, and Asia. Their remains have generally been attributed to the Early to Late Cretaceous.

Spinosaurids were large bipedal carnivores. Their crocodilian-like skulls were long, low, and narrow, bearing conical teeth with reduced or absent serrations. The tips of their upper and lower jaws fanned out into a spoon-shaped structure similar to a rosette, behind which there was a notch in the upper jaw that the expanded tip of the lower jaw fit into. The nostrils of spinosaurids were retracted to a position further back on the head than in most other theropods, and they had bony crests on their heads along the midline of their skulls. Their robust shoulders wielded stocky forelimbs, with three-fingered hands that bore an enlarged claw on the first digit. In many species, the upwards-projecting neural spines of the vertebrae (backbones) were significantly elongated and formed a sail on the animal's back (hence the family's etymology), which supported either a layer of skin or a fatty hump.

The genus Spinosaurus, from which the family, one of its subfamilies (Spinosaurinae) and tribe (Spinosaurini) take their names, is among the largest known terrestrial predators from the fossil record, with an estimated length of up to 14 meters (46 ft) and body mass of up to 7.4 metric tons (8.2 short tons). The closely related genus Sigilmassasaurus may have reached a similar or greater size, though its taxonomy is disputed. Direct fossil evidence and anatomical adaptations indicate that spinosaurids were at least partially piscivorous (fish-eating), with additional fossil finds indicating they also fed on other dinosaurs and pterosaurs. The osteology of spinosaurid teeth and bones has suggested a semiaquatic lifestyle for some members of this clade. This is further indicated by various anatomical adaptations, such as retracted eyes and nostrils; and the deepening of the tail in some taxa, which has been suggested to have aided in underwater propulsion akin to that of modern crocodilians. Spinosaurs are proposed to be closely related to the megalosaurid theropods of the Jurassic. This is due to both groups sharing many features such an enlarged claw on their first manual ungual and an elongated skull. However, some propose that this group (which is known as the Megalosauroidea) is paraphyletic and that spinosaurs represent either the most basal tetanurans or the basal carnosaurs which are less derived than the megalosaurids. Some have proposed a combination of the two ideas with spinosaurs being in a monophyletic Megalosauroidea inside a more inclusive Carnosauria that is made up of both allosauroids and megalosauroids.

== History of discovery ==
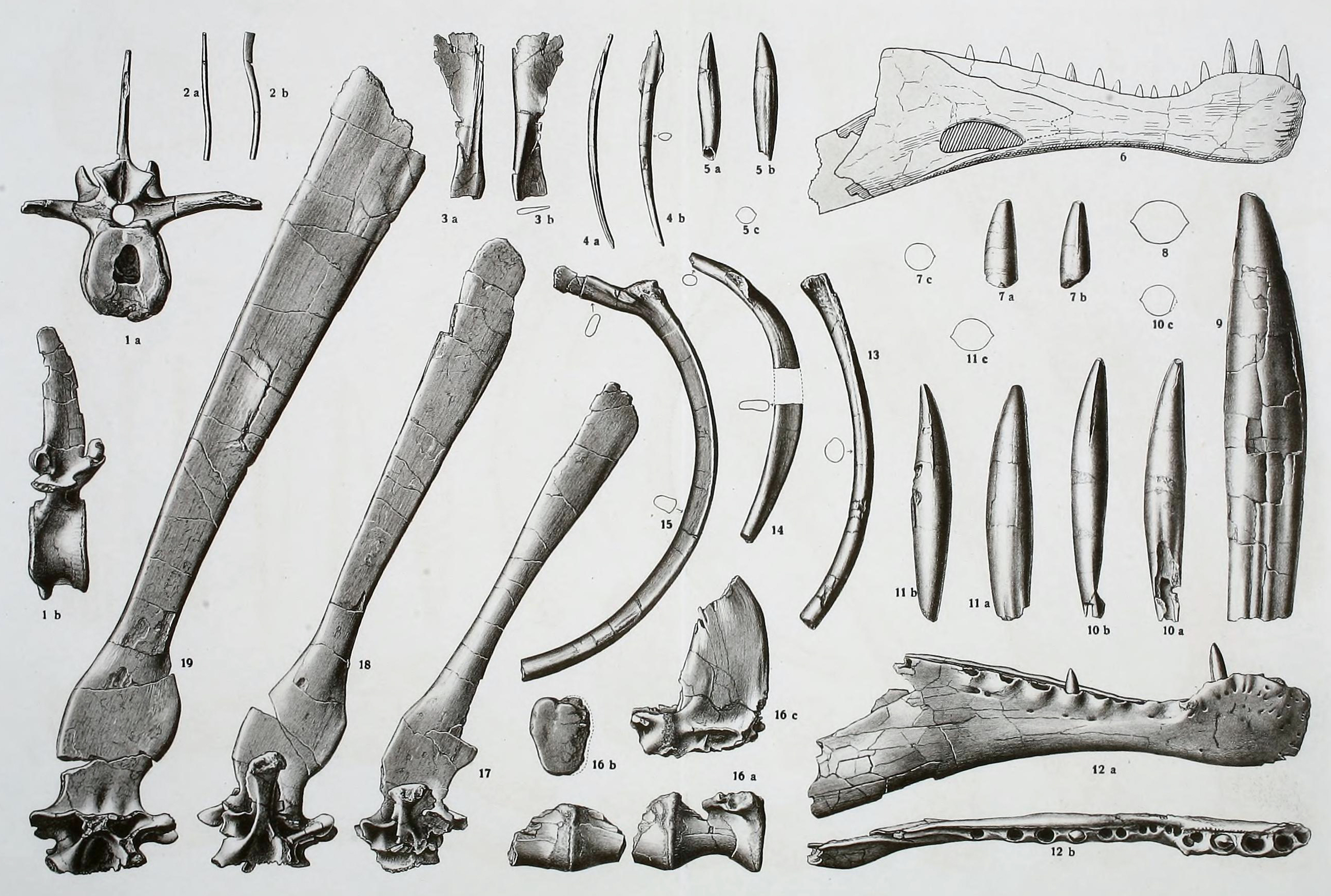
Elements of the holotype specimen of Spinosaurus aegyptiacus, as illustrated by Ernst Stromer in 1915

The first spinosaurid fossil, a single conical tooth, was discovered circa 1820 by British paleontologist Gideon Mantell in the Wadhurst Clay Formation. In 1841, naturalist Sir Richard Owen mistakenly assigned it to a crocodilian he named Suchosaurus (meaning "crocodile lizard"). A second species, S. girardi, was later named in 1897. However, the spinosaurid nature of Suchosaurus was not recognized until a 1998 redescription of Baryonyx.

The first fossils referred to a spinosaurid were discovered in 1912 at the Bahariya Formation in Egypt. Consisting of vertebrae, skull fragments, and teeth, these remains became the holotype specimen of the new genus and species Spinosaurus aegyptiacus in 1915, when they were described by German paleontologist Ernst Stromer. The dinosaur's name meant "Egyptian spine lizard", in reference to the unusually long neural spines not seen previously in any other theropod. In April 1944, the holotype of S. aegyptiacus was destroyed during an allied bombing raid in World War II. In 1934, Stromer referred a partial skeleton also from the Bahariya Formation to a new species of Spinosaurus; the specimen has since been alternatively assigned to another African spinosaurid, Sigilmassasaurus.

In 1983, a relatively complete skeleton was excavated from the Smokejacks pit in Surrey, England. These remains were described by British paleontologists Alan J. Charig and Angela C. Milner in 1986 as the holotype of a new species, Baryonyx walkeri. After the discovery of Baryonyx, many new genera have since been described, with the majority from very incomplete remains. However, other finds bear enough fossil material and distinct anatomical features to be assigned with confidence. Paul Sereno and colleagues described Suchomimus in 1998, a baryonychine from Niger, on the basis of a partial skeleton found in 1997. In 2004, partial jaw bones were recovered from the Alcântara Formation, these were referred to a new genus of spinosaurine named Oxalaia in 2011 by Alexander Kellner.

Fragmentary remains belonging to a large spinosaurid were collected in 2021 from the Vectis Formation on the Isle of Wight. The material lacks distinct characteristics that would prompt the erection of a new species. However, the size of the bones is comparable to the size of Spinosaurus, making the "White Rock spinosaurid" one of the largest theropods ever found in Europe in addition to the first theropod identified in the Vectis Formation.

In 2024, Riojavenatrix lacustris became the fifth spinosaurid species to be named from material found in the Iberian Peninsula, following Camarillasaurus, Iberospinus, Protathlitis, and Vallibonavenatrix. The fossils hail from the Early Cretaceous Enciso Group of La Rioja, Spain.

In 2026, Paul Sereno and colleagues described Spinosaurus mirabilis, a new species of Spinosaurus from the Farak Formation of Niger.

== Description ==
Size comparison of spinosaurid genera (from left to right) Irritator, Baryonyx, Oxalaia, Spinosaurus, Suchomimus, and Ichthyovenator with a human

Although reliable size and weight estimates for most known spinosaurids are hindered by the lack of good material, all known spinosaurids were large animals. The smallest genus known from good material is Irritator, which was between 6 and 8 meters (20 and 26 feet) long and around 1 metric ton (1.1 short tons; 0.98 long tons) in weight. Ichthyovenator, Baryonyx, and Suchomimus ranged from 7.5 to 11 m (25 to 36 ft) long, and weighed between 1 and 5.2 t (1.1 and 5.7 short tons; 0.98 and 5.12 long tons). Oxalaia may have reached a length of between 12 and 14 m (39 and 46 ft) and a weight of 5 to 7 t (5.5 to 7.7 short tons; 4.9 to 6.9 long tons). The largest known genus is Spinosaurus, which was capable of reaching lengths of 14 m (46 ft) and weighed around 7.4 t (8.2 short tons; 7.3 long tons), making it among the largest known theropod dinosaurs and terrestrial predators. The closely allied Sigilmassasaurus may have grown to a similar or greater length, though its taxonomic relationship with Spinosaurus is uncertain. This consistency in large body size among spinosaurids could have evolved as a byproduct of their preference for semiaquatic lifestyles, as without the need to compete with other large theropod dinosaurs for food, they would have been able to grow to massive lengths.

=== Skull ===
Annotated skull diagram of Spinosaurus

Spinosaurid skulls—similar in many respects to those of crocodilians—were long, low and narrow. As in other theropods, various fenestrae (openings) in the skull aided in reducing its weight. In spinosaurs however, the antorbital fenestrae were greatly reduced, akin to those of crocodilians. The tips of the premaxillae (frontmost snout bones) were expanded in a spoon shape, forming what has been called a "terminal rosette" of enlarged teeth. Behind this expansion, the upper jaw had a notch bearing significantly smaller teeth, into which the also expanded tips of the dentaries (tooth bearing bones of the mandible) fit into, with a notch behind the expansion of the dentary. The maxillae (main upper jaw bones) were long and formed a low branch under the nostrils that connected to the rear of the premaxillae. The teeth at the frontmost part of the maxillae were small, becoming significantly larger soon after and then gradually decreasing in size towards the back of the jaw. Analysis of the teeth of spinosaurids and their comparison to the teeth of tyrannosaurids suggest that the deep roots of spinosaurids helped to better anchor the teeth of these animals and distribute the stress against lateral forces generated during bites in predation and feeding scenarios.

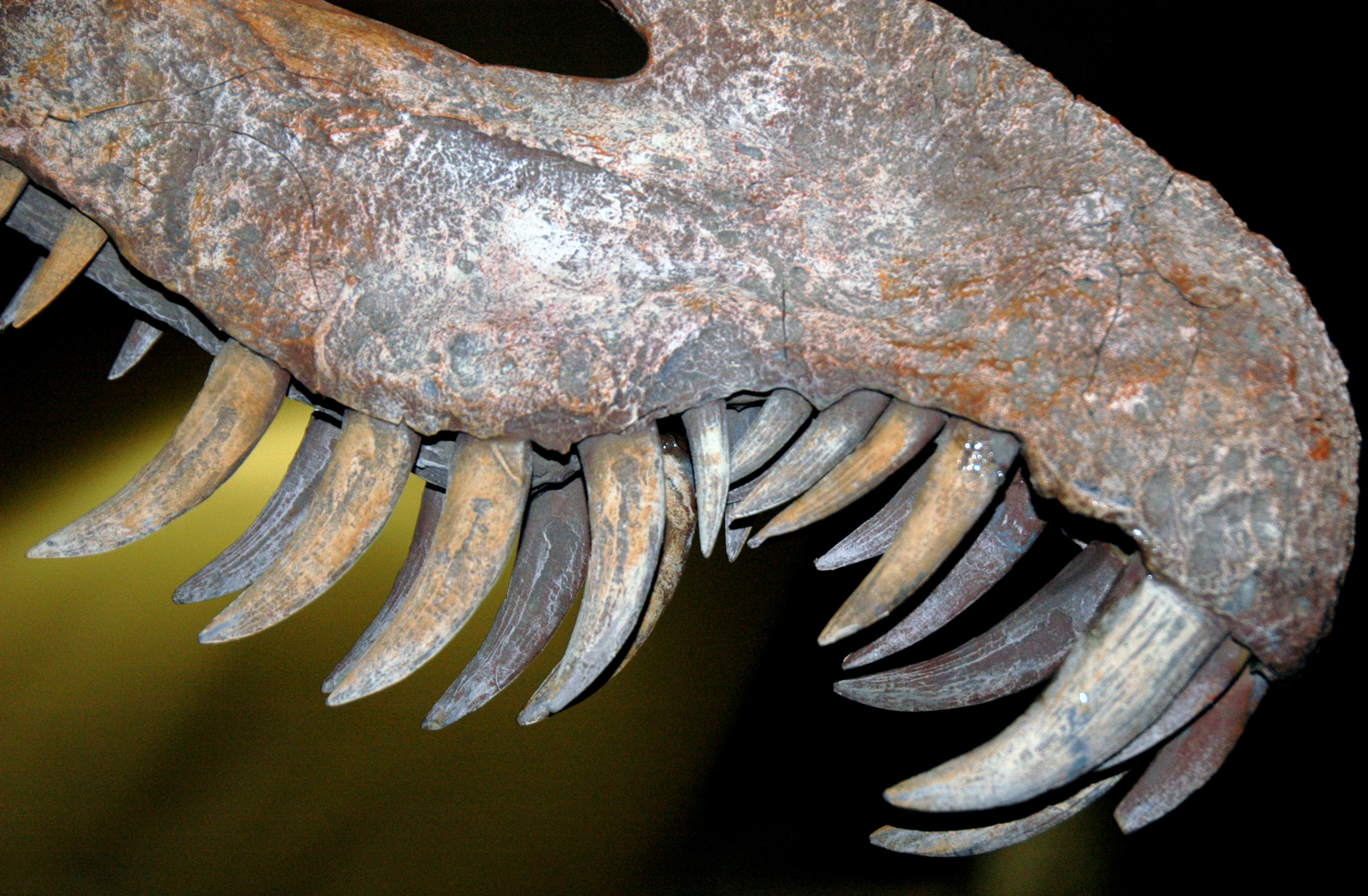
Closeup of the teeth of Suchomimus

Despite their highly modified skulls, analysis of the endocasts of Baryonyx walkeri and Ceratosuchops inferodios reveals spinosaurid brains shared a high degree of similarity with those of other non-maniraptoriform theropods.

Lengthwise atop their skulls ran a thin and shallow sagittal crest that was usually tallest near or above the eyes, either becoming shorter or disappearing entirely towards the front of the head. Spinosaurus's head crest was comb-shaped and bore distinct vertical grooves, while those of Baryonyx and Suchomimus looked like small triangular bumps. Irritator's median crest stopped above and behind the eyes in a bulbous, flattened shape. However, given that no fully preserved skulls are known for the genus, the complete shape of Irritator's crest is unknown. Cristatusaurus and Suchomimus (a possible synonym of the former) both had narrow premaxillary crests. Angaturama (a possible synonym of Irritator) had an unusually tall crest on its premaxillae that nearly overhung the tip of the snout with a small forward protrusion.

Spinosaurid nostrils were set far back on the skull, at least behind the teeth of the premaxillae, instead of at the front of the snout as in most theropods. Those of Baryonyx and Suchomimus were large and started between the first and fourth maxillary teeth, while Spinosaurus's nostrils were far smaller and more retracted. Irritator's nostrils were positioned similarly to those of Baryonyx and Suchomimus, and were between those of Spinosaurus and Suchomimus in size. Spinosaurids had long secondary palates, bony and rugose structures on the roof of their mouths that are also found in extant crocodilians, but not in most theropod dinosaurs. Oxalaia had a particularly elaborate secondary palate, while most spinosaurs had smoother ones. The teeth of spinosaurids were conical, with an oval to circular cross section and either absent or very fine serrations. Their teeth ranged from slightly recurved, such as those of Baryonyx and Suchomimus, to straight, such as those of Spinosaurus and Siamosaurus, and the crown was often ornamented with longitudinal grooves or ridges.

A 2026 study which analyzed the cranial material referred two controversial spinosaurid taxa (Cristatusaurus and Spinosaurus maroccanus), in which the data was interpreted as consistent with a higly developed neurovascular system on the premaxilla (tip of the snout) as well as a high tooth replacement rate from a young age.

=== Postcranial skeleton ===
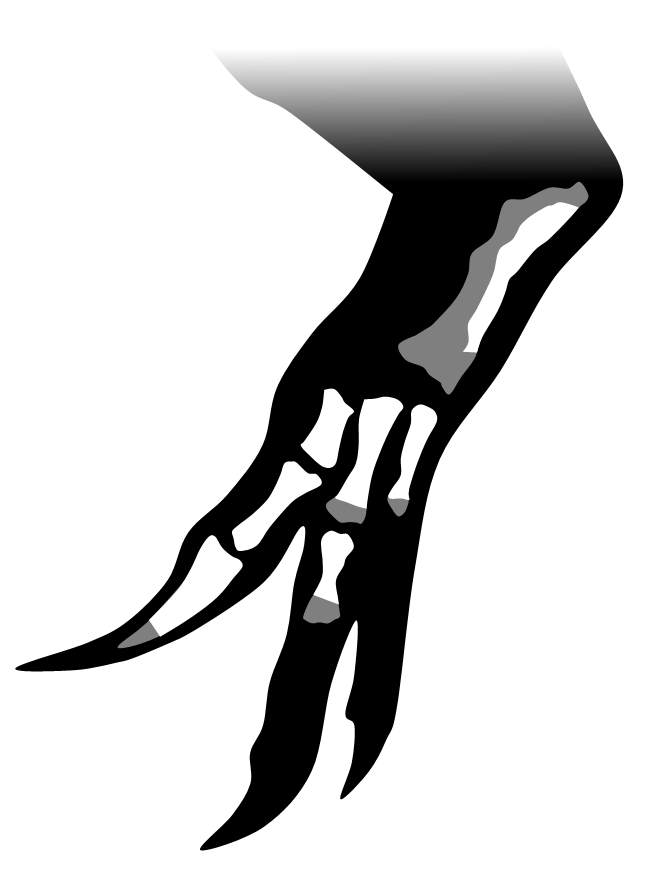
Hand of spinosaurid specimen MN-4819-V (possibly belonging to Angaturama); note the enlarged condition of the first claw

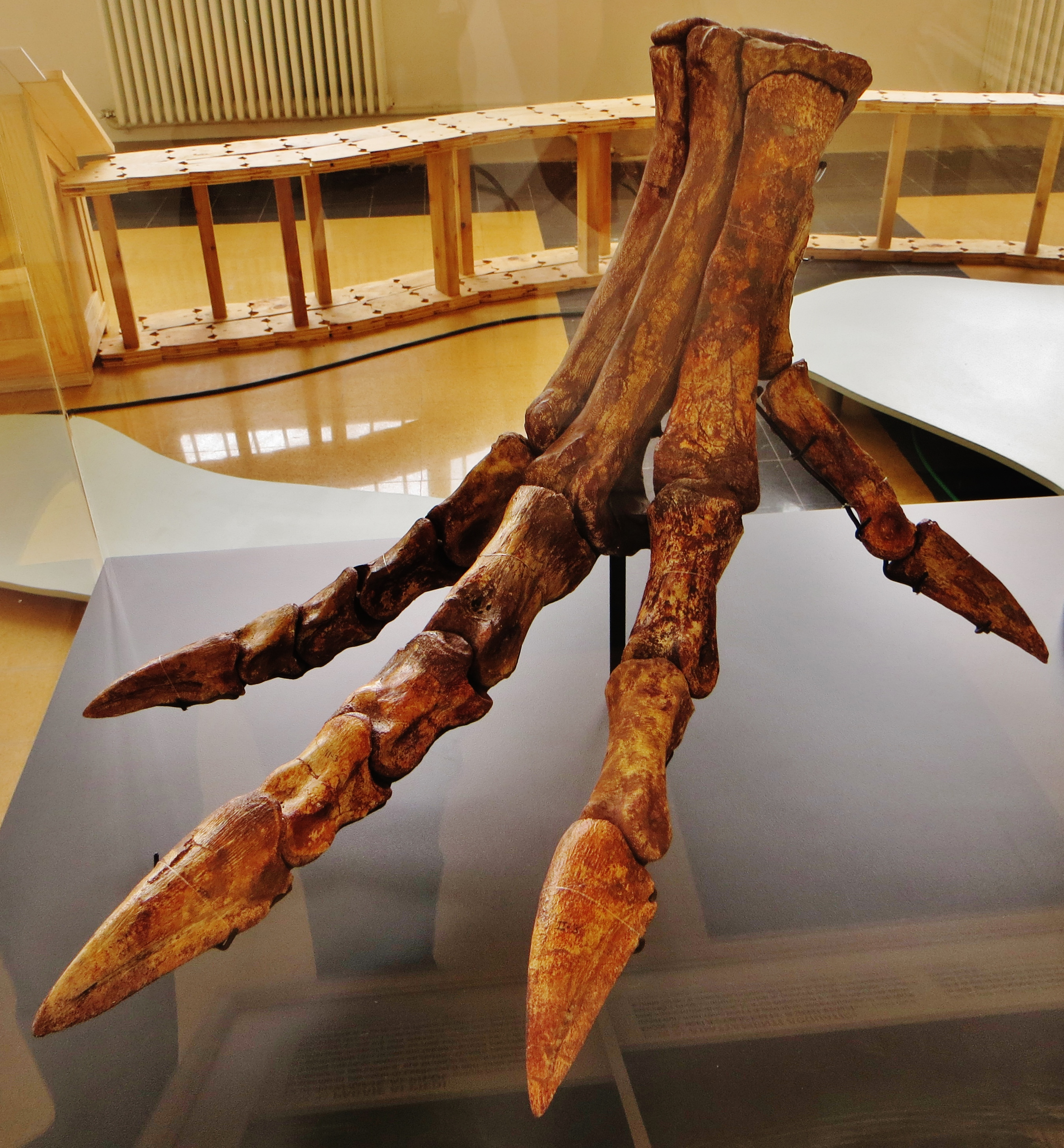
Reconstructed foot bones of Spinosaurus; note the straight claws and enlarged hallux (first toe) touching the ground

The coracoid bones of the shoulders in spinosaurids were robust and hook shaped. The arms were relatively large and well-built; the radius (long bone of the forearm) was stout and usually only half as long as the humerus (upper arm bone). Suchomimus is the only spinosaur known to have preserved a furcula (wishbone), which shows that spinosaurs had a V-shaped furcula. Spinosaurid hands had three fingers, typical of tetanurans, and wielded an enlarged ungual on the first finger (or "thumb"), which formed the bony core of a keratin claw. In genera like Baryonyx and Suchomimus, the phalanges (finger bones) were of conventional length for large theropods, and bore hook-shaped, strongly curved hand claws. Based on fragmentary material from the forelimbs of Spinosaurus, it appears to have had longer, more gracile hands and straighter claws than other spinosaurids.

The hindlimbs of Suchomimus and Baryonyx were somewhat short and mostly conventional of other megalosauroid theropods. Ichthyovenator's hip region was reduced, having the shortest pubis (pubic bone) and ischium (lower and rearmost hip bone) in proportion to the ilium (main hip bone) of any other known theropod. Spinosaurus had an even smaller pelvis and hindlimbs in proportion to its body size; its legs composed just over 25 percent of the total body length. Substantially complete spinosaurid foot remains are only known from Spinosaurus. Unlike most theropods—which walk on three toes, with the hallux (first toe) being reduced and elevated off the ground—Spinosaurus walked on four functional toes, with an enlarged hallux that came in contact with the ground. The unguals of its feet, in contrast with the deeper, smaller and recurved unguals of other theropods, were shallow, long, large in relation to the foot, and had flat bottoms. Based on comparisons with those of modern shorebirds, it is theorized to be probable that the Spinosaurus's feet were webbed.

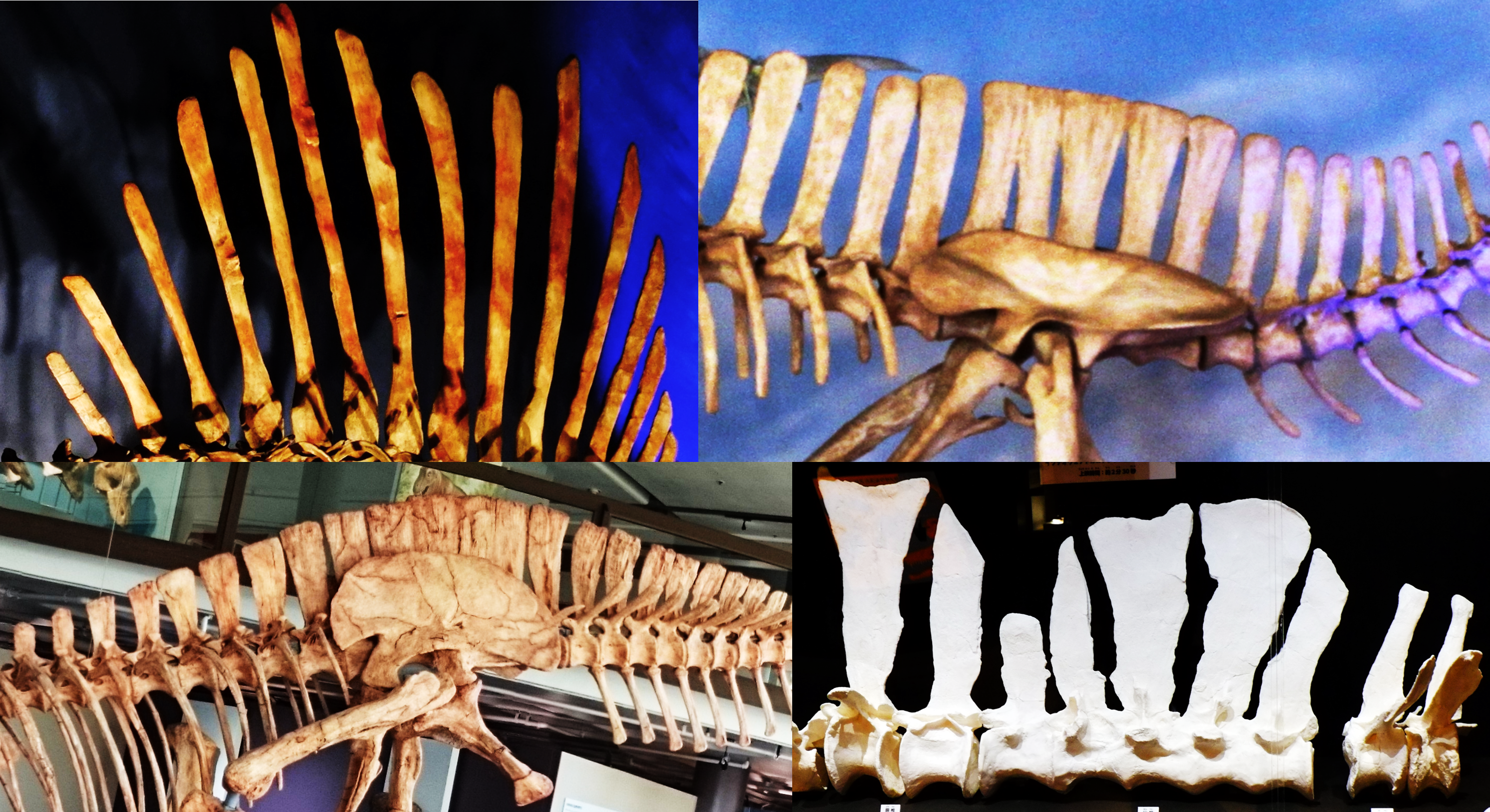
Reconstructed neural spine sails of four spinosaurids; clockwise from top left: Spinosaurus, Irritator, Ichthyovenator, and Suchomimus.

The upward-projecting neural spines of spinosaurid vertebrae (backbones) were very tall, more so than in most theropods. In life, these spines would have been covered in skin or fat tissue and formed a sail down the animal's back, a condition that has also been observed in some carcharodontosaurid and ornithopod dinosaurs. The eponymous neural spines of Spinosaurus were extremely tall, measuring over 1 m (3 ft 3 in) in height on some of the dorsal (back) vertebrae. Suchomimus had a lower, ridge-like sail across the majority of its back, hip, and tail region. Baryonyx showed a reduced sail, with a few of the rearmost vertebral spines being somewhat elongated. Ichthyovenator had a sinusoidal (wave-like) sail that was separated in two over the hips, with the upper ends of some neural spines being broad and fan-shaped. A neural spine from the holotype of Vallibonavenatrix shows a similar morphology to those of Ichthyovenator, indicating the presence of a sail in this genus as well. One partial skeleton possibly referable to Angaturama also had elongated neural spines on its hip region. The presence of a sail in fragmentary taxa like Sigilmassasaurus is unknown. In members of the subfamily Spinosaurinae, like Ichthyovenator and Spinosaurus, the neural spines of the caudal (tail) vertebrae were tall and reclined, accompanied by also elongated chevrons—long, thin bones that form the underside of the tail. This was most pronounced in Spinosaurus, in which the spines and chevrons formed a large paddle-like structure, deepening the tail significantly along most of its length.

== Classification ==
Diagram illustrating various spinosaurids

The family Spinosauridae was named by Stromer in 1915 to include the single genus Spinosaurus. The clade was expanded as more close relatives of Spinosaurus were uncovered. The first cladistic definition of Spinosauridae was provided by Paul Sereno in 1998 (as "All spinosauroids closer to Spinosaurus than to Torvosaurus").

Traditionally, Spinosauridae is divided into two subfamilies: Spinosaurinae, which contains the genera Icthyovenator, Irritator, Oxalaia, Sigilmassasaurus and Spinosaurus, is marked by unserrated, straight teeth, and external nares which are further back on the skull than in baryonychines, and Baryonychinae, which contains the genera Baryonyx, Cristatusaurus, Suchosaurus, Suchomimus, Ceratosuchops, and Riparovenator, which is marked by serrated, slightly curved teeth, smaller size, and more teeth in the lower jaw behind the terminal rosette than in spinosaurines. Others, such as Siamosaurus, may belong to either Baryonychinae or Spinosaurinae, but are too incompletely known to be assigned with confidence. Siamosaurus was classified as a spinosaurine in 2018, but the results are provisional and not entirely conclusive.

The subfamily Spinosaurinae was named by Sereno in 1998, and defined by Thomas Holtz and colleagues in 2004 as all taxa closer to Spinosaurus aegyptiacus than to Baryonyx walkeri. The subfamily Baryonychinae was named by Charig & Milner in 1986. They erected both the subfamily and the family Baryonychidae for the newly discovered Baryonyx, before it was referred to Spinosauridae. Their subfamily was defined by Holtz and colleagues in 2004, as the complementary clade of all taxa closer to Baryonyx walkeri than to Spinosaurus aegyptiacus. Examinations in 2017 by Marcos Sales and Cesar Schultz suggested that the South American spinosaurids Angaturama and Irritator may be intermediate between Baronychinae and Spinosaurinae based on their craniodental features and cladistic analysis. A study by Arden et al. (2018) named the tribe Spinosaurini to include Spinosaurus and Sigilmassasaurus. The results of the 2018 phylogenetic analysis by Arden and colleagues, which included many unnamed taxa, are displayed in the cladogram below:

- Spinosauridae
  - Praia das Aguncheiras taxon (Iberospinus)
  - Baryonychinae
    - Baryonyx walkeri
    - Suchomimus tenerensis
  - Spinosaurinae
    - Siamosaurus suteethorni
    - - Eumeralla taxon
      - - Ichthyovenator laosensis
        - - Irritator challengeri
          - Oxalaia quilombensis
          - Spinosaurini
            - Gara Samani taxon
            - Sigilmassasaurus brevicollis
            - Spinosaurus aegyptiacus

In 2021, Barker et al. described two new spinosaurid species, Ceratosuchops inferodios and Riparovenator milnerae as part of a newly proposed Ceratosuchopsini. In the paper, they performed a phylogenetic analysis focused on Spinosauridae. The results of their analysis appear below:

- - Megalosauridae
  - Spinosauridae
    - Vallibonavenatrix
    - - Baryonychinae
        - - Iberospinus
          - Baryonyx
        - Ceratosuchopsini
          - Suchomimus
          - - Riparovenator
            - Ceratosuchops
      - Spinosaurinae
        - Camarillasaurus
        - - Ichthyovenator
          - - Irritator
            - Spinosaurini
              - Sigilmassasaurus
              - - "Spinosaurus B"
                - - MSNM V4047
                  - - FSAC-KK 11888
                    - Spinosaurus holotype

=== Evolution ===
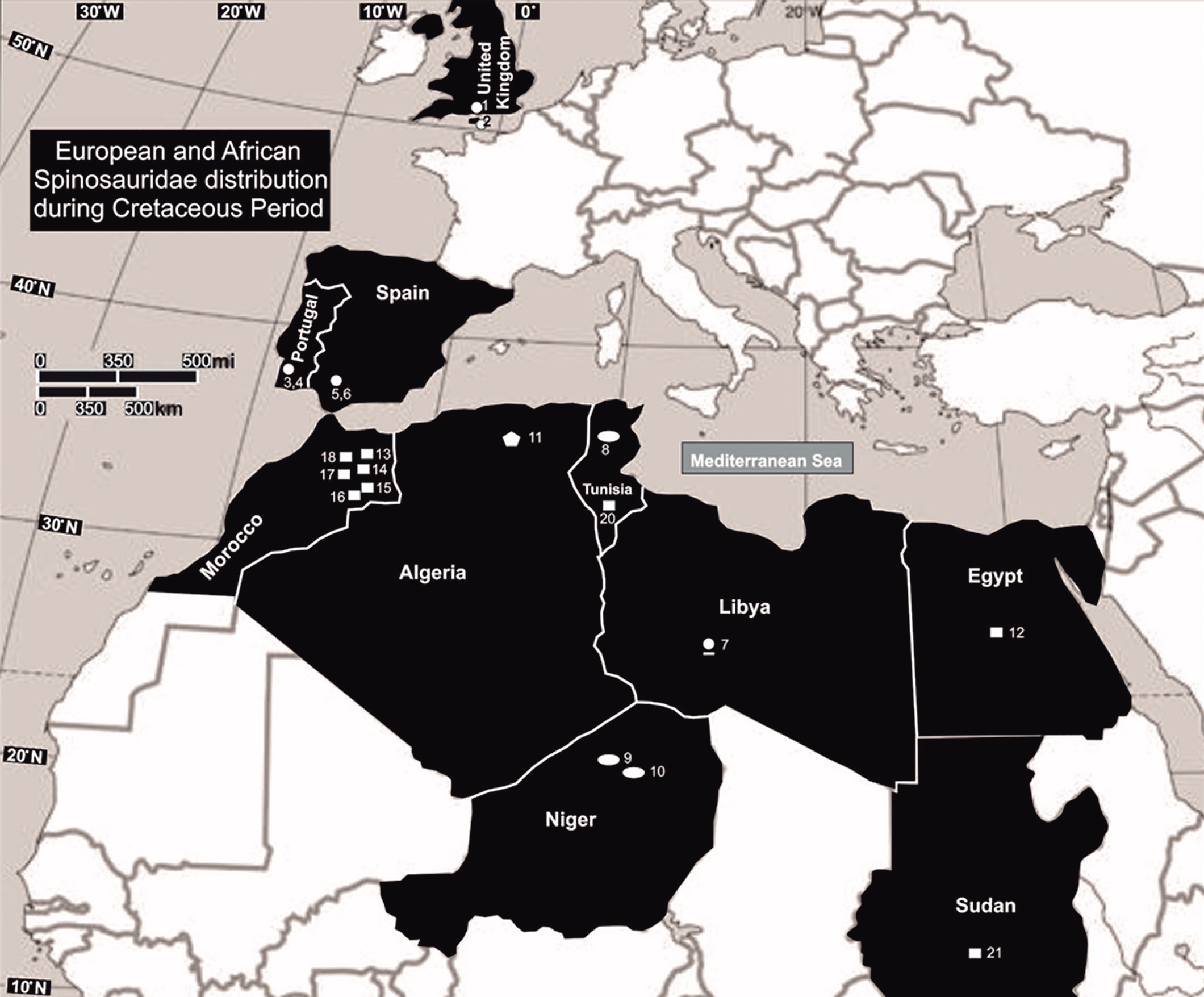
Distribution of spinosaurids in Europe and North Africa during the Cretaceous; 1, 3, 4, 5, 6 are Baryonyx

Spinosaurids appear to have been widespread from the Barremian to the Cenomanian stages of the Cretaceous period, about 130 to 95 million years ago. Possibly the earliest remains of spinosaurids are known from the Middle Jurassic of Niger and India, the latter of which otherwise has no remains of spinosaurids. They shared features such as long, narrow, crocodile-like skulls; sub-circular teeth, with fine to no serrations; the terminal rosette of the snout; and a secondary palate that made them more resistant to torsion. In contrast, the primitive and typical condition for theropods was a tall, narrow snout with blade-like (ziphodont) teeth with serrated carinae. The skull adaptations of spinosaurids converged with those of crocodilians; early members of the latter group had skulls similar to typical theropods, later developing elongated snouts, conical teeth, and secondary palates. These adaptations may have been the result of a dietary change from terrestrial prey to fish. Unlike crocodiles, the post-cranial skeletons of baryonychine spinosaurids do not appear to have aquatic adaptations. Sereno and colleagues proposed in 1998 that the large thumb-claw and robust forelimbs of spinosaurids evolved in the Middle Jurassic, before the elongation of the skull and other adaptations related to fish-eating, since the former features are shared with their megalosaurid relatives. They also suggested that the spinosaurines and baryonychines diverged before the Barremian age of the Early Cretaceous.

Several theories have been proposed about the biogeography of the spinosaurids. Since Suchomimus was more closely related to Baryonyx (from Europe) than to Spinosaurus—although that genus also lived in Africa—the distribution of spinosaurids cannot be explained as vicariance resulting from continental rifting. Sereno and colleagues proposed that spinosaurids were initially distributed across the supercontinent Pangea, but split with the opening of the Tethys Sea. Spinosaurines would then have evolved in the south (Africa and South America: in Gondwana) and baryonychines in the north (Europe: in Laurasia), with Suchomimus the result of a single north-to-south dispersal event. Buffetaut and the Tunisian palaeontologist Mohamed Ouaja also suggested in 2002 that baryonychines could be the ancestors of spinosaurines, which appear to have replaced the former in Africa. Milner suggested in 2003 that spinosaurids originated in Laurasia during the Jurassic, and dispersed via the Iberian land bridge into Gondwana, where they radiated. In 2007, Buffetaut pointed out that palaeogeographical studies had demonstrated that Iberia was near northern Africa during the Early Cretaceous, which he found to confirm Milner's idea that the Iberian region was a stepping stone between Europe and Africa, which is supported by the presence of baryonychines in Iberia. The direction of the dispersal between Europe and Africa is still unknown, and subsequent discoveries of spinosaurid remains in Asia and possibly Australia indicate that it may have been complex.

In 2016, the Spanish palaeontologist Alejandro Serrano-Martínez and colleagues reported the oldest known spinosaurid fossil, a tooth from the Middle Jurassic of Niger, which they found to suggest that spinosaurids originated in Gondwana, since other known Jurassic spinosaurid teeth are also from Africa, but they found the subsequent dispersal routes unclear. Some later studies instead suggested this tooth belonged to a megalosaurid. Candeiro and colleagues suggested in 2017 that spinosaurids of northern Gondwana were replaced by other predators, such as abelisauroids, since no definite spinosaurid fossils are known from after the Cenomanian anywhere in the world. They attributed the disappearance of spinosaurids and other shifts in the fauna of Gondwana to changes in the environment, perhaps caused by transgressions in sea level. Malafaia and colleagues stated in 2020 that Baryonyx remains the oldest unquestionable spinosaurid, while acknowledging that older remains had also been tentatively assigned to the group. Barker and colleagues found support for a European origin for spinosaurids in 2021, with an expansion to Asia and Gondwana during the first half of the Early Cretaceous. In contrast to Sereno, these authors suggested there had been at least two dispersal events from Europe to Africa, leading to Suchomimus and the African part of Spinosaurinae.

== Paleobiology ==
=== Diet and feeding ===
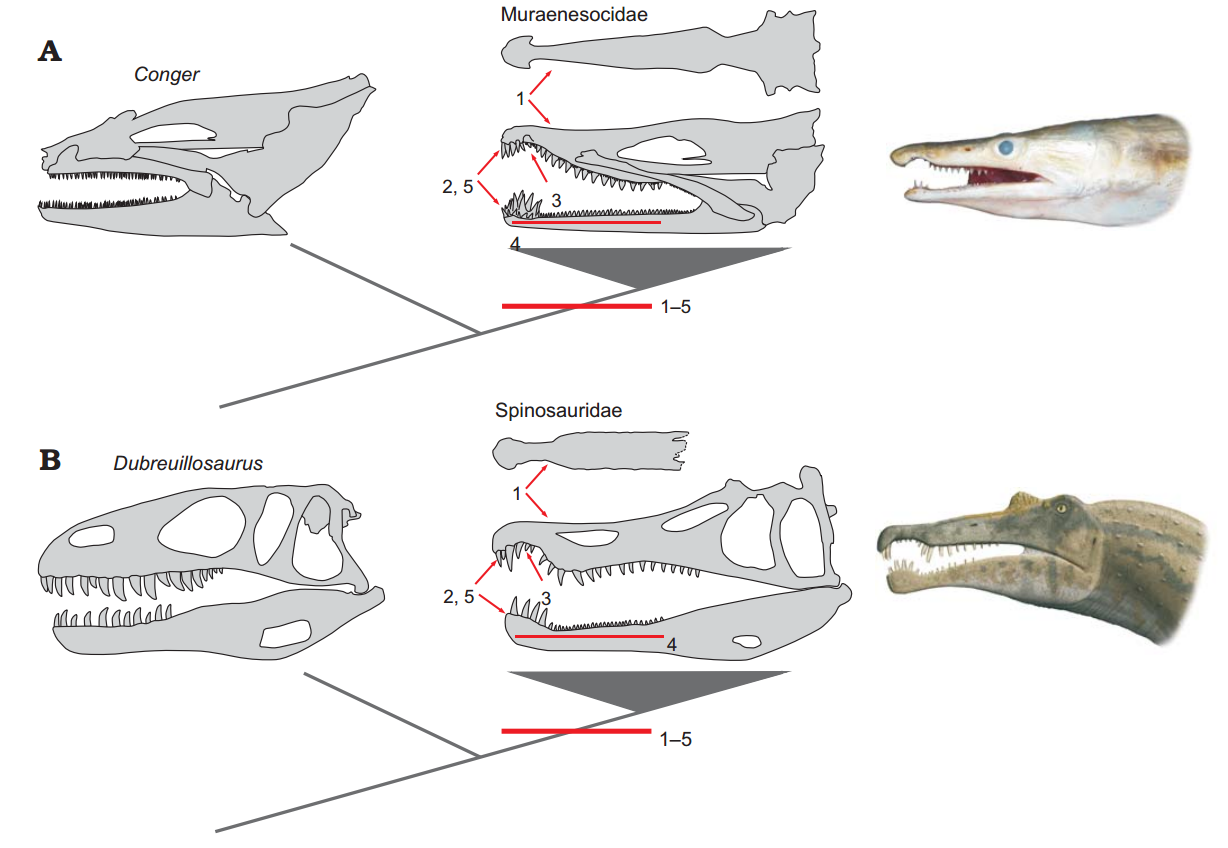
Comparison of a spinosaurid skull with that of Dubreuillosaurus and two extant pike conger eels

Spinosaurid teeth resemble those of crocodiles, which are used for piercing and holding prey. Therefore, teeth with small or no serrations, such as in spinosaurids, were not good for cutting or ripping into flesh but instead helped to ensure a strong grip on a struggling prey animal. However, some have argued that spinosaurids converge more with phytosaurs in terms of craniodental anatomy and that phytosaurs are a better analogue for inferring their life modes. Spinosaurid jaws were likened by Romain Vullo and colleagues to those of the pike conger eel, in what they hypothesized was convergent evolution for aquatic feeding. Both kinds of animals have some teeth in the end of the upper and lower jaws that are larger than the others and an area of the upper jaw with smaller teeth, creating a gap into which the enlarged teeth of the lower jaw fit, with the full structure called a terminal rosette.

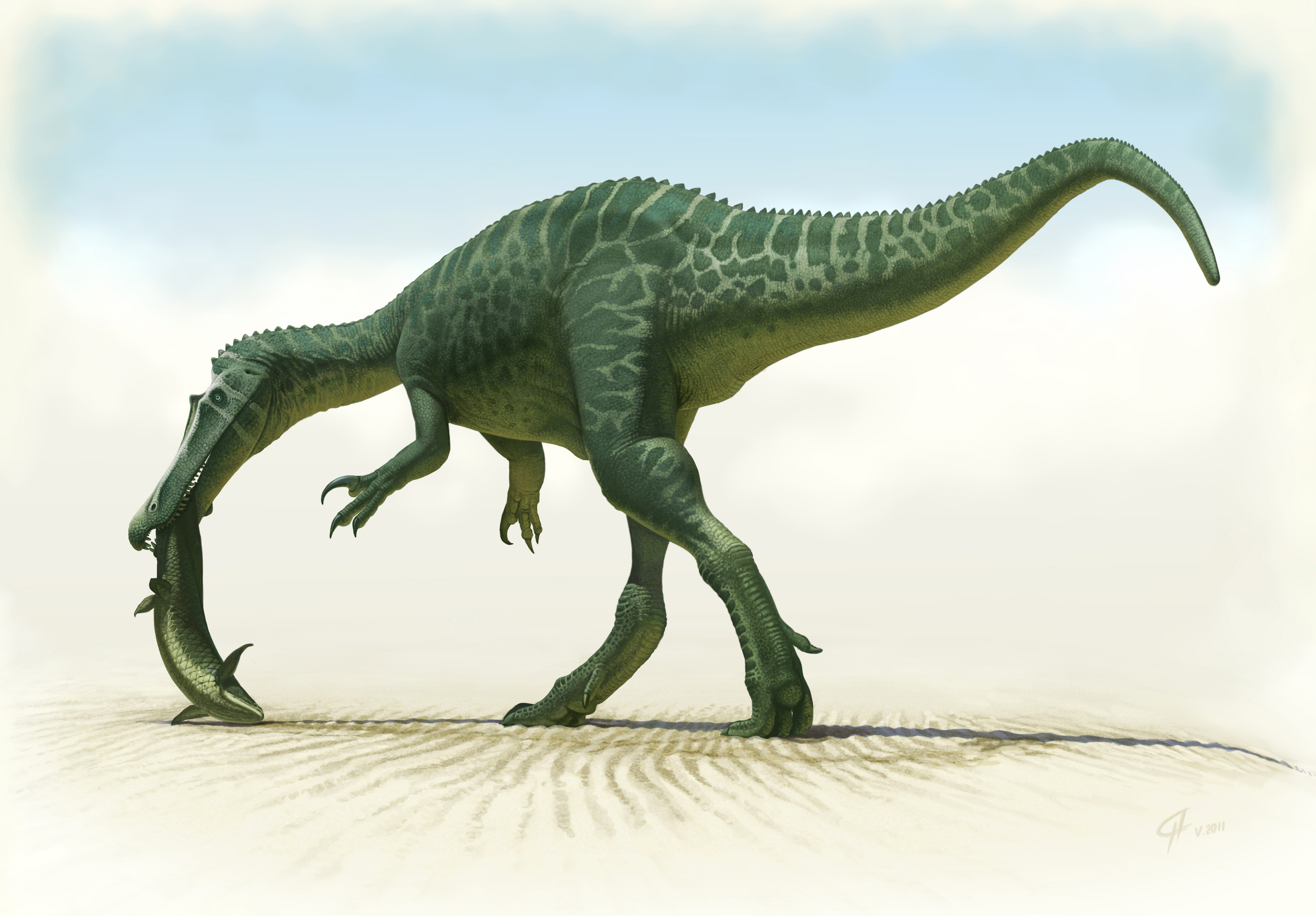
Life restoration of Baryonyx with a fish in its jaws

In the past, spinosaurids have often been considered piscivores (fish-eaters) in the main, based on comparisons of their jaws with those of modern crocodilians. In 2007, British paleontologist Emily J. Rayfield and colleagues conducted biomechanical studies on the skull of Baryonyx, which had a long, laterally compressed skull, comparing it to gharial (long, narrow, tubular) and alligator (flat and wide) skulls. They found that the structure of baryonychine jaws converged on that of gharials, in that the two taxa showed similar response patterns to stress from simulated feeding loads, and did so with and without the presence of a (simulated) secondary palate. The gharial, exemplar of a long, narrow, and tubular snout, is a fish specialist. However, this snout anatomy does not preclude other options for the spinosaurids. The gharial is the most extreme example and a fish specialist; Australian freshwater crocodiles, which have similarly shaped skulls to gharials, also specialize more on fish than sympatric, broad snouted crocodiles and are opportunistic feeders which eat all manner of small aquatic prey, including insects and crustaceans. Thus, spinosaurids' snouts correlate with piscivory; this is consistent with hypotheses of this diet for spinosaurids, in particular baryonychines, but it does not indicate that they were solely piscivorous.

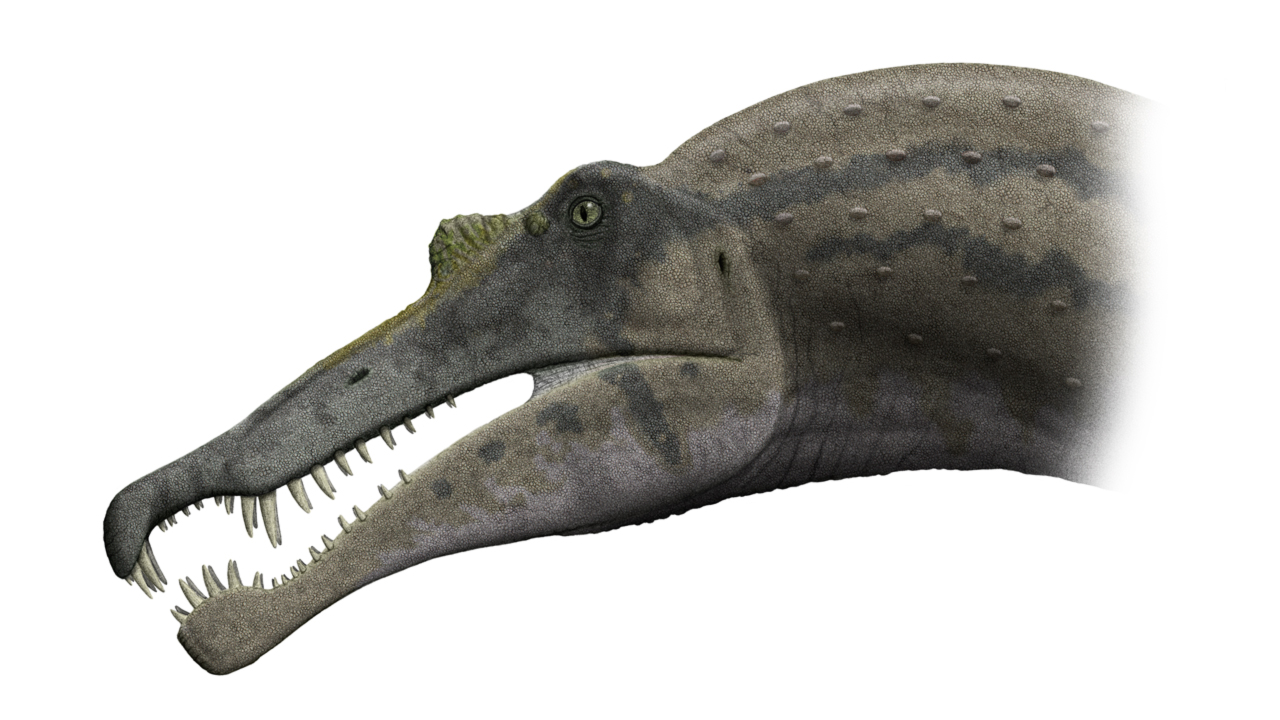
Life restoration of the head of Spinosaurus

Further study by Andrew R. Cuff and Rayfield in 2013 on the skulls of Spinosaurus and Baryonyx did not recover similarities in the skulls of Baryonyx and the gharial that the previous study did. Baryonyx had, in models where the size difference of the skulls was corrected for, greater resistance to torsion and dorsoventral bending than both Spinosaurus and the gharial, while both spinosaurids were inferior to the gharial, alligator, and slender-snouted crocodile in resisting torsion and medio-lateral bending. When the results from the modeling were not scaled according to size, then both spinosaurids performed better than all the crocodilians in resistance to bending and torsion, due to their larger size. Thus, Cuff and Rayfield suggested that the skulls were not efficiently built to deal well with relatively large, struggling prey, but that spinosaurids may overcome prey simply by their size advantage, and not skull build. In 2002, Hans-Dieter Sues and colleagues studied the construction of the spinosaurid skull, and concluded that their mode of feeding was to use extremely quick, powerful strikes to seize small prey items using their jaws, whilst employing the powerful neck muscles in rapid up-and-down motion. Due to the narrow snout, vigorous side-to-side motion of the skull during prey capture is unlikely. Based on the size and positions of their nostrils, Marcos Sales and Cesar Schultz in 2017 suggested that Spinosaurus possessed a greater reliance on its sense of smell and had a more piscivorous lifestyle than Irritator and baryonychines.

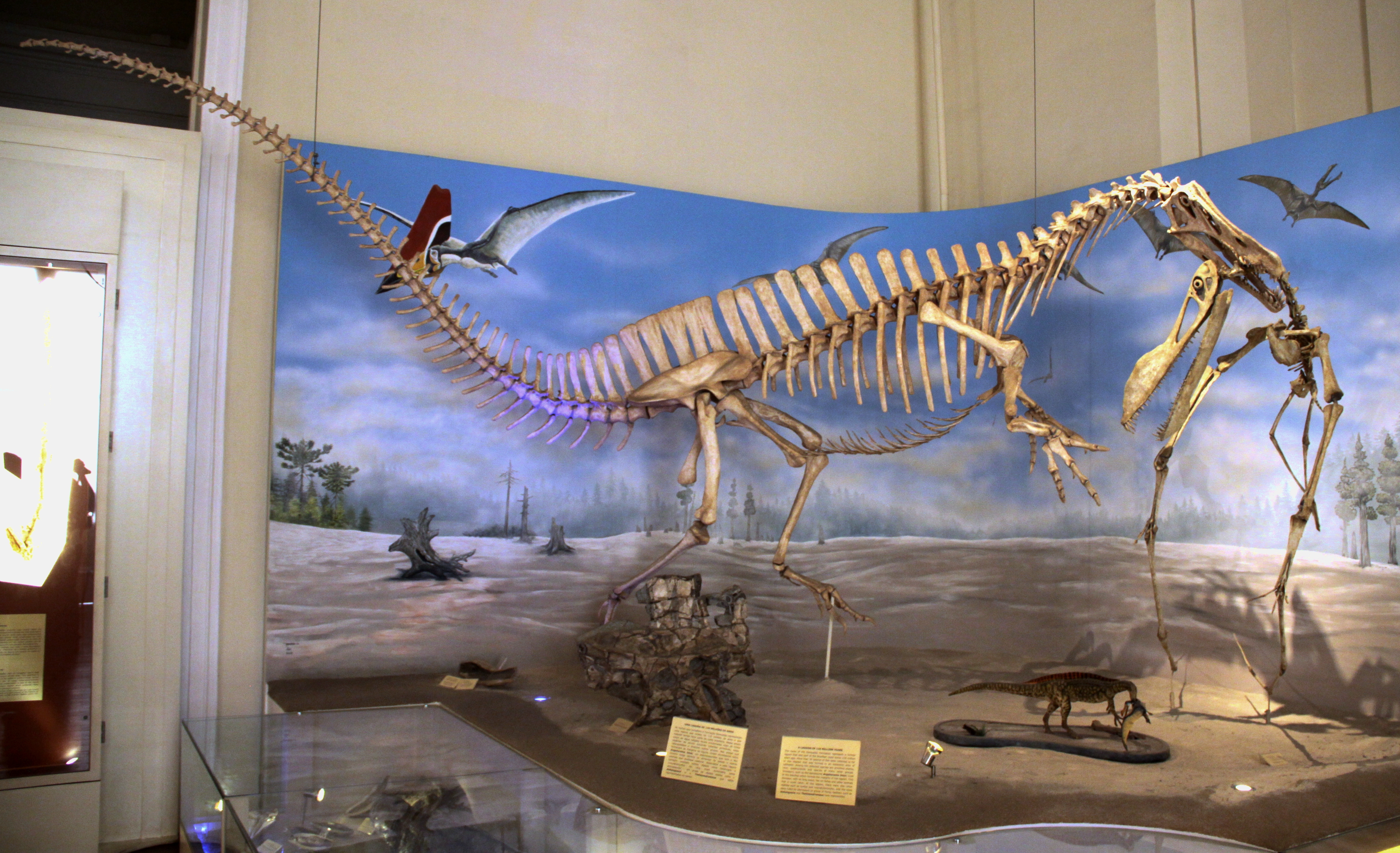
Reconstructed Irritator skeleton mounted as attacking an anhanguerid pterosaur, National Museum of Rio de Janeiro

Direct fossil evidence shows that spinosaurids fed on fish as well as a variety of other small to medium-sized animals, including dinosaurs. Baryonyx was found with scales of the prehistoric fish Scheenstia in its body cavity, and these were abraded, hypothetically by gastric juices. Bones of a young Iguanodon, also abraded, were found alongside this specimen. If these represent Baryonyx's meal, the animal was, whether in this case a hunter, or a scavenger, an eater of more diverse fare than fish. Moreover, there is a documented example of a spinosaurid having eaten a pterosaur, as one Irritator tooth was found lodged within the fossil vertebrae of an ornithocheirid pterosaur found in the Romualdo Formation of Brazil. This may represent a predation or a scavenging event. A fossil snout referred to Spinosaurus was discovered with a vertebra from the sclerorhynchid Onchopristis embedded in it. In the Sao Khua Formation of Thailand, isolated tooth crowns from Siamosaurus have been found in association with sauropod remains, indicating possible predation or scavenging. The Portuguese Iberospinus fossils were also found associated with isolated Iguanodon teeth, and those cases are listed; along with other such associations as support for opportunistic feeding behaviour in spinosaurids.

A 2018 study by Auguste Hassler and colleagues of calcium isotopes in the teeth of North African theropods found that spinosaurids had a mixed diet of fish and herbivorous dinosaurs (such as Nigersaurus and Ouranosaurus), whereas the other theropods examined (abelisaurids and carcharodontosaurids) mainly fed on herbivorous dinosaurs. This might indicate ecological partitioning between these theropods. Later in the same year, Tito Aureliano and colleagues presented a possible scenario for the food web of Brazilian Romualdo Formation. The researchers proposed that the diet of spinosaurines from this environment may have included—in addition to pterosaurs—terrestrial and aquatic crocodyliforms, juveniles of their own species, turtles, and small to medium-sized dinosaurs. This would have made spinosaurines apex predators within this particular ecosystem.

A 2024 study by D'Amore et al., further vindicates the theory that spinosaurids were similar in niche to generalist or macro-generalist crocodilians. This study likewise suggests their jaws and teeth were well-suited to quick strikes and deep, puncturing bites, but not for slicing flesh or crushing bones. In particular, baryonychine spinosaurids probably did little oral processing of their prey when feeding, but by comparison, spinosaurines were found to be quite capable of processing the meat of relatively large vertebrate prey. None of these findings suggest any spinosaurids from either subfamily were restricted only to fish and small aquatic vertebrates.

Hendrickx (2026) suggested that spinosaurids likely had a generalist dietary preference but probably consumed more aquatic prey than other theropods based on dentition analysis. Pittet (2026) analyzed skull elements referred to the two controversial taxa Cristatusaurus and Spinosaurus maroccanus, interpreting the analyzed data as consitent with a highly developed neurovascular system of the snout's tip and a high tooth replacement rate from a young age. Buffetaut et al. (2026) reported distinct types of spinosaurid teeth from the Early Cretaceous of eastern Thailand, including a type with no enamel ribbing, interpreted as having possible preference to terrestrial prey, such as turtles.

=== Forelimb function ===
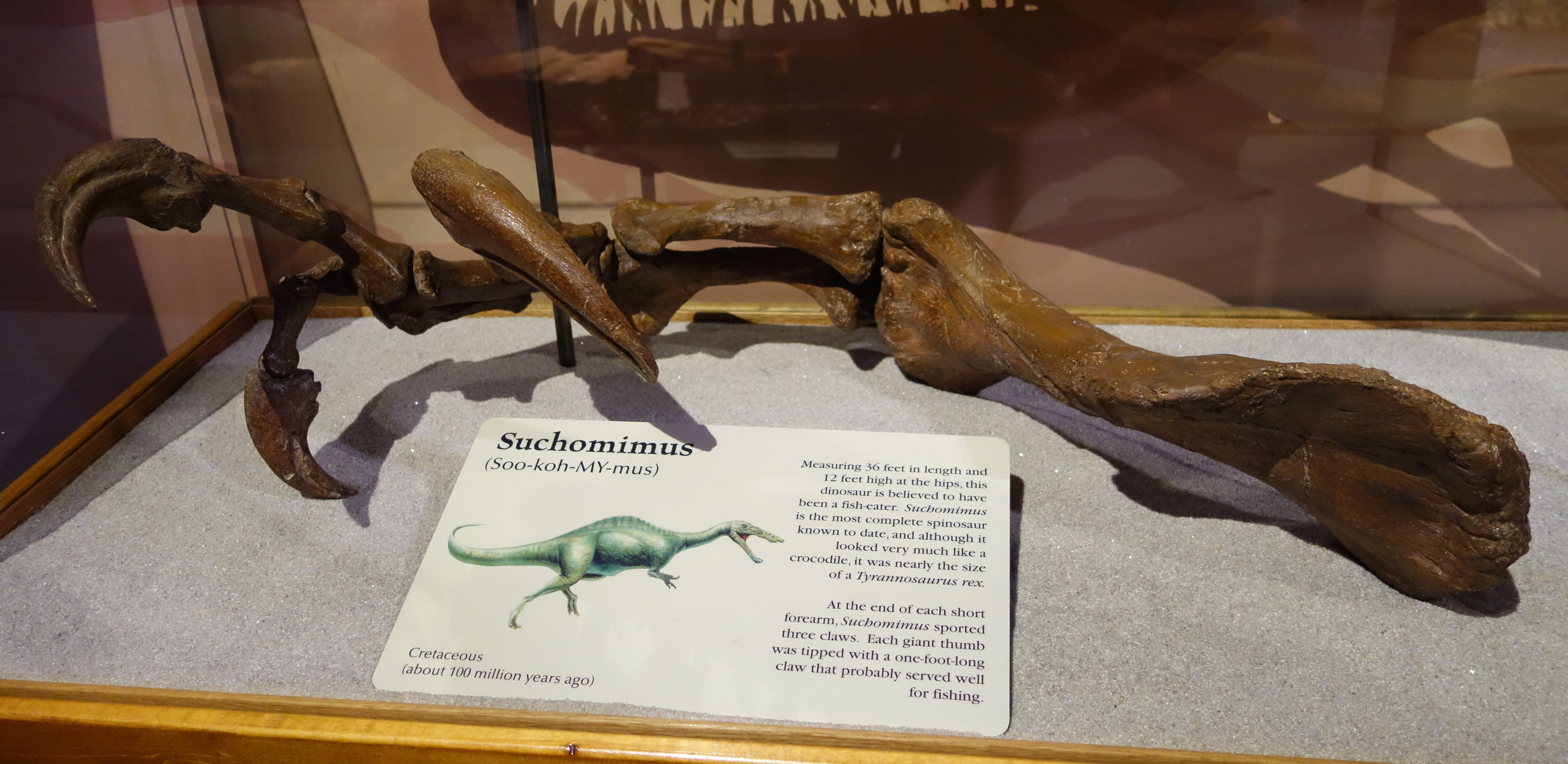
Reconstructed forelimb and hand of Suchomimus, Museum of Ancient Life, Utah

The use of the robust forelimbs and giant recurved claws of spinosaurs remains a debated topic. Charig and Milner speculated in 1986 that Baryonyx may have crouched by the riverbank and used its claws to gaff fish out of the water, similarly to grizzly bears. In 1987, British biologist Andrew Kitchener argued that with both its crocodile-like snout and enlarged claws, Baryonyx seemed to have too many adaptations for piscivory when one would have been enough. Kitchener instead postulated that Baryonyx more likely used its arms to scavenge the corpses of large dinosaurs, such as Iguanodon, by breaking into the carcass with the large claws, and subsequently probing for viscera with its long snout. In their 1997 article, Charig and Milner rejected this hypothesis, pointing out that in most cases, a carcass would have already been largely emptied out by its initial predators. Later research has also ruled out this sort of specialized scavenging.

In 1986, Charig and Milner suggested that the robust forelimbs and giant thumb claws would have been Baryonyx's primary method of capturing, killing, and tearing apart large prey; whereas its long snout would have been used mostly for fishing. A 2005 study by Canadian paleontologist the François Therrien and colleagues agreed that spinosaur forelimbs were probably used for hunting larger prey items, given that their snouts could not resist the bending stress. In a 2017 review of the family, David Hone and Holtz considered possible functions in digging for water sources or hard to reach prey, as well as burrowing into soil to construct nests. In 2026, Scherer, Steell and Upchurch suggested that baryonychines and other spinosaurids in general had relatively lower skull–forelimb length ratios than other theropod lineages, which are indicative of less forelimb reduction and possibly more reliance on using the forelimbs than the skull for prey capture.

=== Cranial crests and neural spines ===
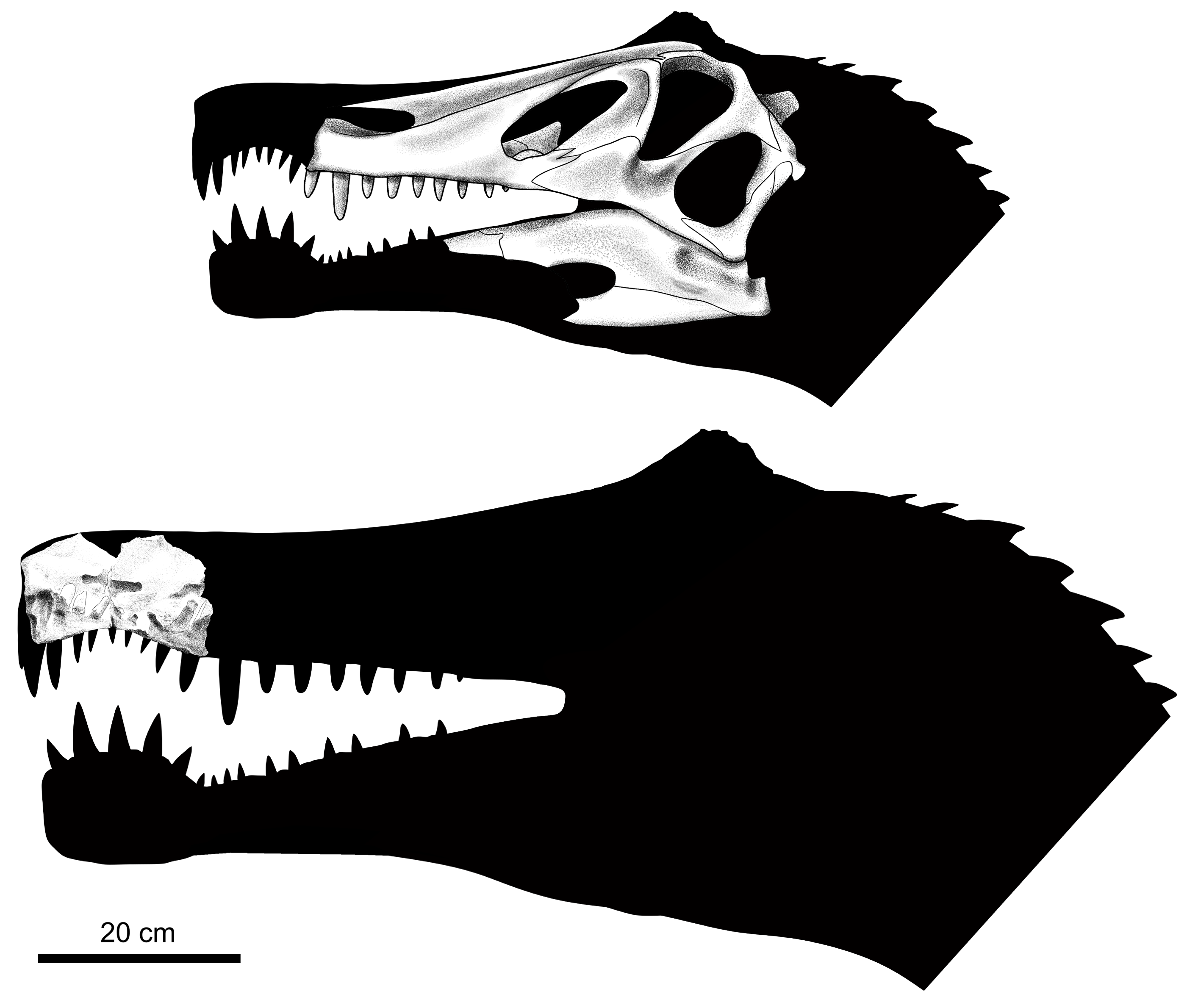
Holotype skull specimens of Irritator challengeri (top, showing the beginnings of a nasal crest) and Angaturama limai (bottom, showing a tall premaxillary crest)

Theropod heads are often decorated with some form of crest, horn, or rugose structure, which in life, would have been extended by keratin. Though there has been little discussion on the head crests of spinosaurs, Hone and Holtz in 2017 considered that their most likely use was for displaying to potential mates or as a means of threatening rivals and other predators. Such has been suggested for theropod cranial structures before, which may have been aided by unusual or bright coloration to provide further visual cues.

Many theories have been proposed over the years for the use of spinosaurid dorsal sails, such as thermoregulation; to aid in swimming; to store energy or insulate the animal; or for display purposes, such as intimidating rivals and predators, or attracting mates. Many elaborate body structures of modern-day animals serve to attract members of the opposite sex during mating. It is possible that the sail of Spinosaurus was used for courtship, in a way similar to a peacock's tail. In 1915, Stromer speculated that the size of the neural spines may have differed between males and females. In 2012, French paleontologist Ronan Allain and colleagues suggested considering the high diversity in neural spine elongation observed in theropod dinosaurs, as well as histological research done on the sails of synapsids (stem mammals), the sinusoidal sail of Ichthyovenator was likely used for courtship display or recognising members of its own species. In a 2013 blog post, Darren Naish considered the latter function unlikely, favouring the hypothesis of sexual selection for Ichthyovenator's sail because it appears to have evolved on its own, without very close relatives. Naish also notes it is possible similar relatives have not yet been discovered.

In 2015, the German biophysicist Jan Gimsa and colleagues suggested that this feature could also have aided aquatic movement by improving manoeuvrability when submerged, and acted as fulcrum for powerful movements of the neck and tail (similar to those of sailfish or thresher sharks).

=== Ontogeny ===
Juvenile spinosaurid fossils are somewhat rare. However, an ungual phalanx measuring 21 mm (0.83 in) belonging to a very young Spinosaurus indicates that Spinosaurus, and probably by extent other spinosaurids, may have developed their semiaquatic adaptations at birth or at a very young age and maintained the adaptations throughout their lives. The specimen, found in 1999 and described by Simone Maganuco, Cristiano Dal Sasso and colleagues in 2018, is believed to have come from a very small juvenile measuring 1.78 m (5.8 ft), making said specimen the smallest known example of a spinosaurid currently described.

== Paleoecology ==
=== Habitat preference ===
A 2010 publication by Romain Amiot and colleagues found that oxygen isotope ratios of spinosaurid bones indicates semiaquatic lifestyles. Isotope ratios from teeth from Baryonyx, Irritator, Siamosaurus, and Spinosaurus were compared with isotopic compositions from contemporaneous theropods, turtles, and crocodilians. The study found that, among theropods, spinosaurid isotope ratios were closer to those of turtles and crocodilians. Siamosaurus specimens tended to have the largest difference from the ratios of other theropods, and Spinosaurus tended to have the least difference. The authors concluded that spinosaurids, like modern crocodilians and hippopotamuses, spent much of their daily lives in water. The authors also suggested that semiaquatic habits and piscivory in spinosaurids can explain how spinosaurids coexisted with other large theropods: by feeding on different prey items and living in different habitats, the different types of theropods would have been out of direct competition.

In 2016, Sales and colleagues statistically examined the fossil distribution of spinosaurids, abelisaurids, and carcharodontosaurids, and concluded that spinosaurids had the strongest support for association with coastal palaeoenvironments. Spinosaurids also appear to have inhabited inland environments (with their distribution there being comparable to carcharodontosaurids), which indicates they may have been more generalist than usually thought. In 2018, an analysis was conducted on the partial tibia of an indeterminate spinosaurine from the early Albian, the bone was from a sub-adult between 7 and 13 m (22 and 42 ft) in length still growing moderately fast before its death. This specimen (LPP-PV-0042) was found in the Araripe Basin of Brazil and taken to the University of San Carlos for a CT Scan, where it revealed osteosclerosis (high bone density). This condition had previously only been observed in Spinosaurus, as a possible way of controlling its buoyancy. The presence of this condition on the leg fragment showed that semi-aquatic adaptations in spinosaurids were already present at least 10 million years before Spinosaurus aegyptiacus appeared. According to the phylogenetic bracketing method, this high bone density might have been present in all spinosaurines. In the same year, Canadian palaeontologist Donald M. Henderson published a study of theropod buoyancy (through simulation with 3D models) and found that distantly related theropods floated as well as the tested spinosaurs, and instead supported they would have stayed by the shorelines or shallow water rather than being semi-aquatic.

In 2021, Beevor and colleagues reported the bonebed containing the teeth of Spinosaurus and rostral denticles of Onchopristis, and suggested this as taphonomic evidence in the Kem Kem group that would support Spinosaurus being a semi-aquatic dinosaur. In 2024, Myhrvold and colleagues cited the immediate assumption of spinosaurids being avid divers due to correlations in bone compactness as being subject to errors, such as flawed statistical methods and measurements, as well as sampling bias. Given the amount of variation in specimens and in data collection techniques, they concluded that previous evidence isn't strong enough to put Spinosaurus swimming and diving entirely submerged, suggesting that Spinosaurus still more likely mostly hung out on shore, akin to wader lifestyle previously interfered.

A 2026 paper by Cau et al. analyzed five spinosaurine skulls and found evidence of the presence of salt glands, which had convergently evolved to be similar to those of semi-aquatic and aquatic birds. This suggests that derived spinosaurines were able to hunt in brackish and saltwater environments. They noted that the evidence of salt glands do not necessarily confirm whether spinosaurines are fully aquatic, diving pursuit predators, or hunted prey like modern wading birds.

=== Distribution ===
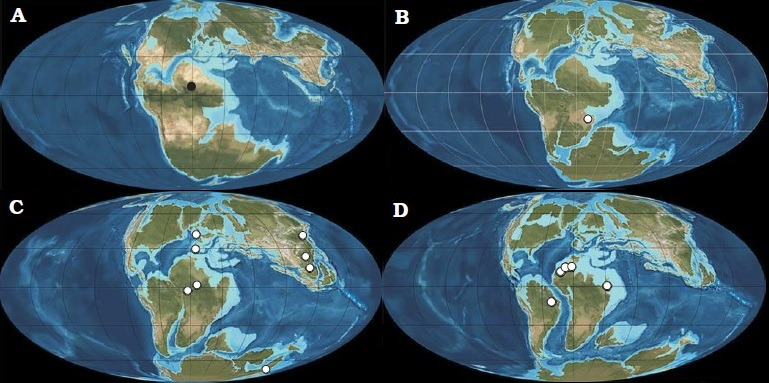
Generalized locations of spinosaurid fossil discoveries from the Bajocian–Bathonian (A), Tithonian (B), Barremian−Aptian (C), and Albian−Cenomanian (D) marked on maps of those time spans.

Confirmed spinosaurids have been found on every continent except for North America, Australia and Antarctica, the first of which was Spinosaurus aegyptiacus, discovered at the Bahariya Formation in Egypt. Baryonychines were common, such as Baryonyx, which lived during the Barremian of England and Spain. Baryonyx-like teeth are also found from the earlier Hauterivian and later Aptian sediments of Spain, as well as the Hauterivian of England. Baryonychines were represented in Africa, with Suchomimus tenerensis and Cristatusaurus lapparenti as well as Baryonyx-like teeth from the Aptian of Niger. as well as in Europe, with Suchosaurus cultridens and S. girardi from the England. Baryonyx-like teeth are also reported from the Ashdown Sands of Sussex, in England, and the Burgos Province, in Spain. Other European spinosaurids Camarillasaurus cirugedae and Iberospinus natarioi are known from the Barremian of Spain and Portugal, respectively.

The earliest record of spinosaurines is from Europe, with the Barremian species Vallibonavenatrix cani from Spain. Spinosaurines are also present in Albian sediments of Tunisia and Algeria, and in Cenomanian sediments of Egypt and Morocco. In Africa, baryonychines were common in the Aptian, and then replaced by spinosaurines in the Albian and Cenomanian. such as in the Kem Kem beds of Morocco, which housed an ecosystem containing many large coexisting predators. A fragment of a spinosaurine lower jaw from the Early Cretaceous was also reported from Tunisia, and referred to Spinosaurus. Spinosaurinae's range also extended to South America, particularly Brazil, with the discoveries of Irritator challengeri, Angaturama limai, and Oxalaia quilombensis. There was also a fossil tooth in Argentina which has been referred to the Spinosauridae by Leonardo Salgado and colleagues. This referral is doubted by Gengo Tanaka et al., who offers Hamadasuchus, a crocodilian, as the most likely animal of origin for these teeth.

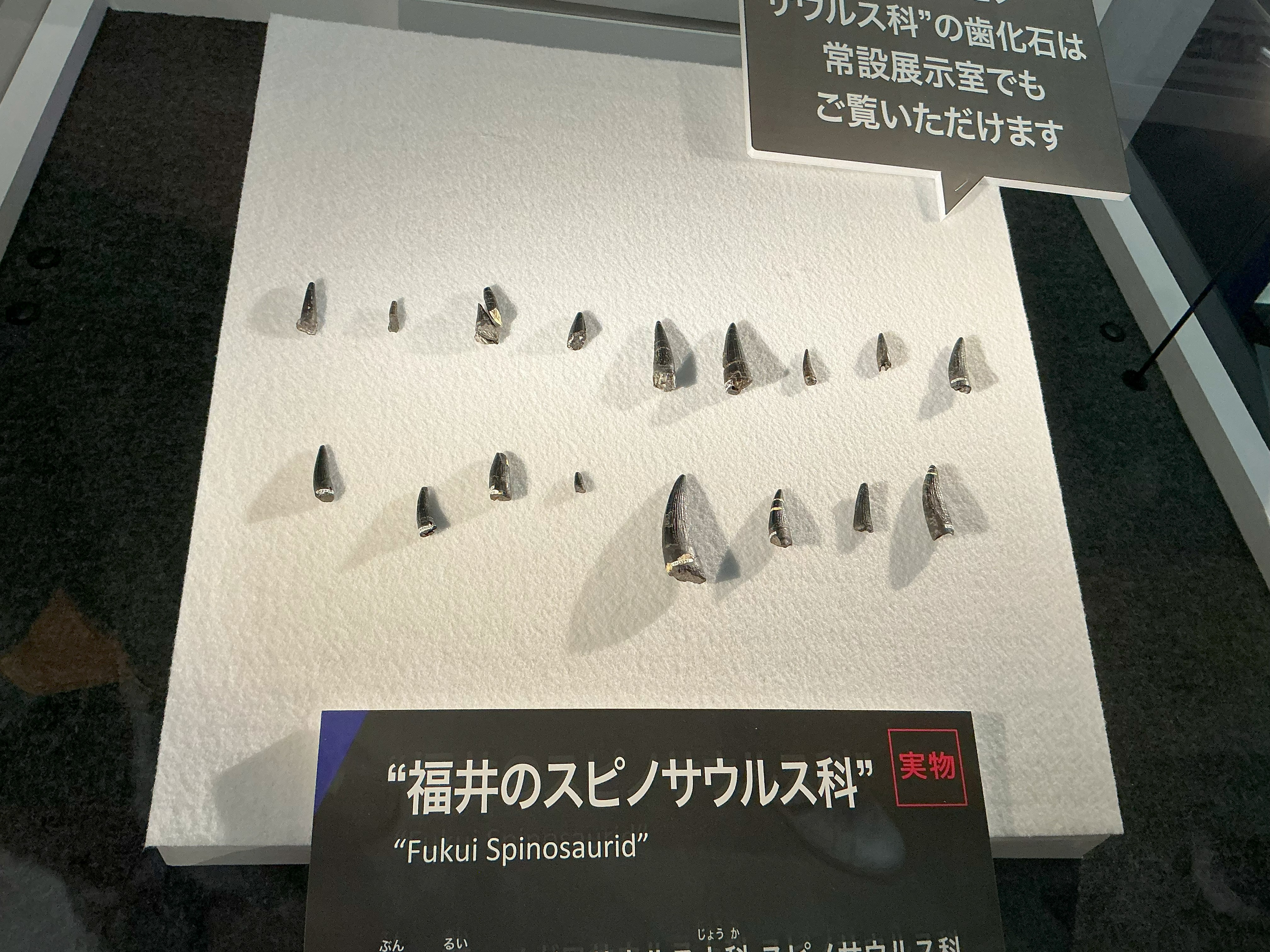
Indeterminate spinosaurid teeth from the Japanese Kitadani Formation

Partial skeletons and numerous fossil teeth indicate spinosaurids were widespread in Asia; three taxa—all spinosaurines—have been named: Siamosaurus suteethorni from Thailand, "Sinopliosaurus" fusuiensis from China, and Ichthyovenator laosensis from Laos. Spinosaurid teeth have been found in Malaysia; they were the first dinosaur remains discovered in the country. Some intermediate specimens extend the known range of spinosaurids past the youngest dates of named taxa. A single theropod tooth attributed to Baryonychinae was found in the mid-Santonian Majiacun Formation of Henan, China, but this tooth lacked spinosaurid synapomorphies, and it was reclassified as a theropod of uncertain affinities, either an allosauroid or a sister taxon of abelisaurids in 2023. In 2025, Olmedo-Romaña et al. described putative theropod teeth with similarities to spinosaurid teeth from the strata of the Fundo El Triunfo Formation (Peru) interpreted as spanning all or part of the Campanian–Maastrichtian interval, and tentatively classified the studied fossil material as remains of late-surviving members of the family Spinosauridae, as well as the first record of the group from western South America. In the same year, Barker, Naish and Gostling argued that these teeth lack key features of spinosaurid dentition, and that they most likely represent crocodylomorph teeth. At la Cantalera-1, a site in the early Barremian Blesa Formation in Treul, Spain, two types of spinosaurid teeth were found, and they were assigned, tentatively, as indeterminate spinosaurine and baryonychine taxa. An indeterminate spinosaurid was discovered in the Early Cretaceous Eumeralla Formation, Australia. It is known from a single 4 cm long partial cervical vertebra, designated NMV P221081. It is missing most of the neural arch. The specimen is from a juvenile estimated to be about 2 to 3 meters long (6–9 ft). Out of all spinosaurids, it most closely resembles Baryonyx. In 2019, it was suggested that the vertebra instead belonged to a megaraptorid theropod, as opposed to a spinosaur. A 2020 publication reported 18 indeterminate spinosaurid teeth from the Aptian Kitadani Formation of Japan.

== See also ==
- Spinosaurus
- Oxalaia
- Sigilmassasaurus
- Baryonyx
