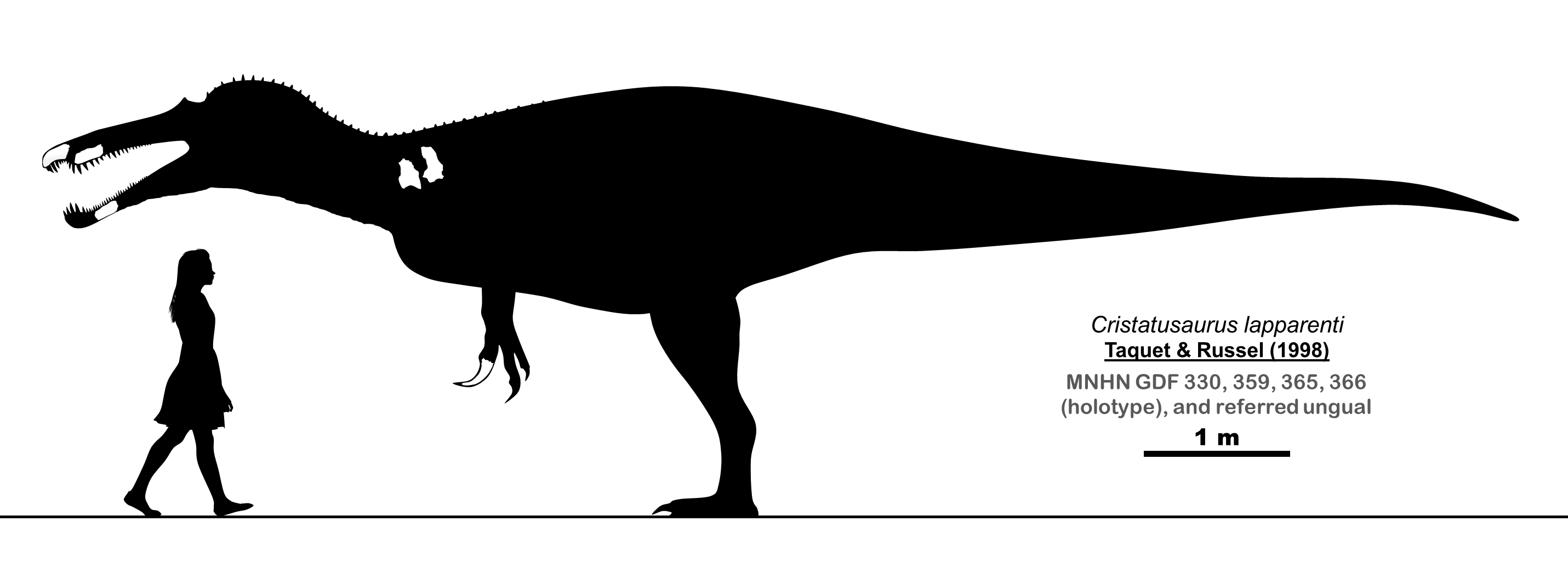
- Diagram illustrating possible size and skeletal reconstruction combining several fossil specimens

Scientific classification
- Kingdom: Animalia
- Phylum: Chordata
- Class: Reptilia
- Clade: Dinosauria
- Clade: Saurischia
- Clade: Theropoda
- Family: †Spinosauridae
- Subfamily: †Baryonychinae
- Genus: †Cristatusaurus; Taquet & Russell, 1998
- Species: †C. lapparenti

Binomial name
- †Cristatusaurus lapparenti Taquet & Russell, 1998

Synonyms
- Suchomimus tenerensis? Sereno et al., 1998

= Cristatusaurus =

Cristatusaurus Temporal range: Early Cretaceous (Albian–Aptian), ~112 Ma

Extinct genus of dinosaurs

Cristatusaurus is a dubious genus of theropod dinosaur that lived during the Early Cretaceous period of what is now Niger, 112 million years ago. It was a baryonychine member of the Spinosauridae, a group of large bipedal carnivores with well-built forelimbs and elongated, crocodile-like skulls. The type species Cristatusaurus lapparenti was named in 1998 by scientists Philippe Taquet and Dale Russell, on the basis of jaw bones and some vertebrae. Two claw fossils were also later assigned to Cristatusaurus. The animal's generic name, which means "crested reptile", alludes to a sagittal crest on top of its snout; while the specific name is in honor of the French paleontologist Albert-Félix de Lapparent. Cristatusaurus is known from the Albian to Aptian Elrhaz Formation, where it would have coexisted with sauropod and iguanodontian dinosaurs, other theropods, and various crocodylomorphs.

Originally proposed to be an indeterminate species of Baryonyx, the identity of Cristatusaurus has been subject to debate, in part due to the fragmentary nature of its fossils. Some argue that it is probably the same dinosaur as Suchomimus, which has also been found in Niger, in the same sediment layers. In that case the genus Cristatusaurus would have priority, since it was named more than two months earlier. Others have concluded, however, that Cristatusaurus is a nomen dubium, considering it indistinguishable from both Suchomimus and Baryonyx. Some distinctions between the fossils of Cristatusaurus and Suchomimus have been pointed out, but it is uncertain whether these differences separate the two genera or if they are due to ontogeny (changes in an organism during growth).

== History of research ==
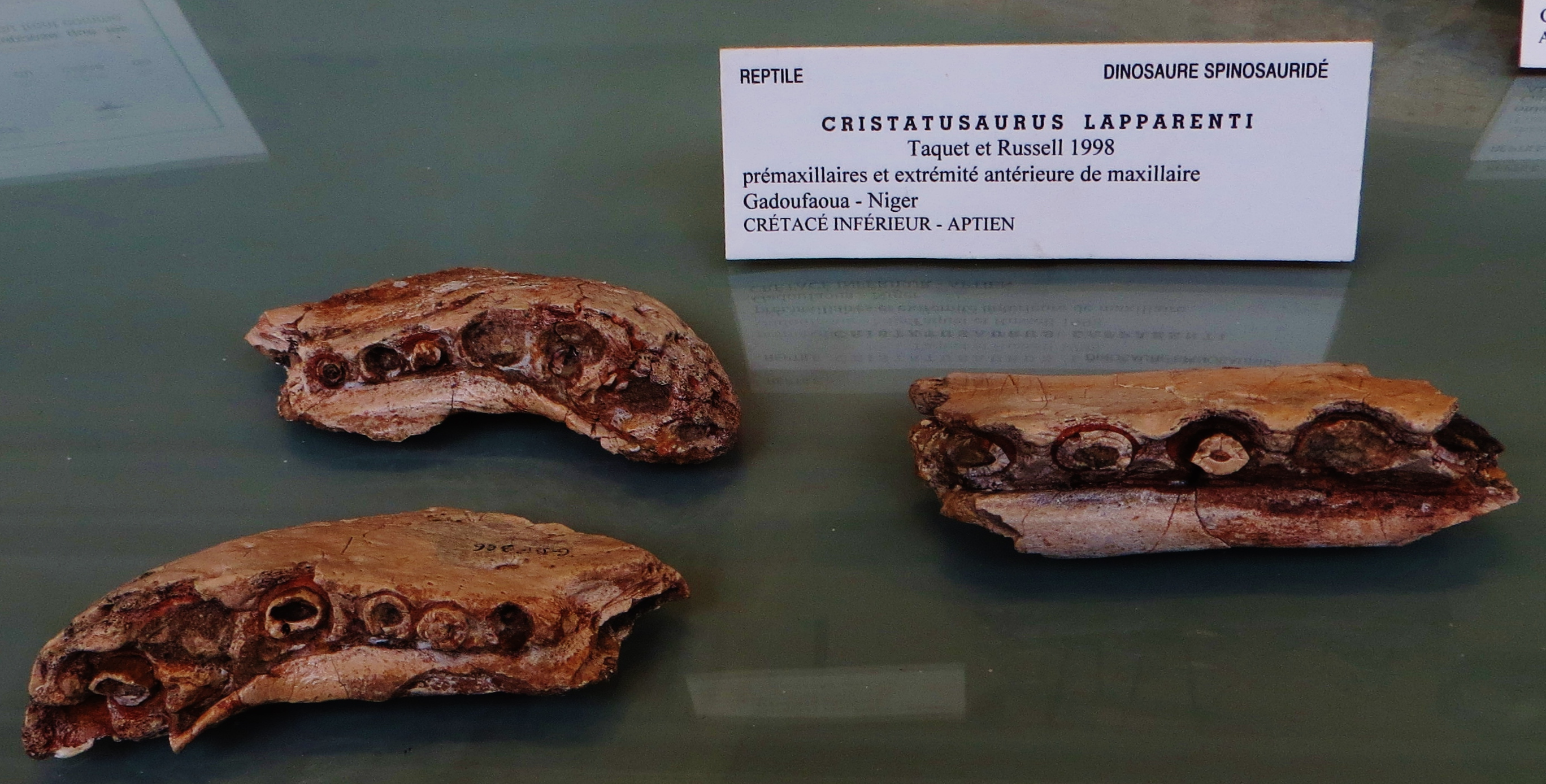
Holotype specimen (MNHN GDF 366), consisting of jaw fossils, Muséum national d'Histoire naturelle, Paris

The first fossils of Cristatusaurus were found in 1973 by French paleontologist Philippe Taquet at Gadoufaoua, a locality within the Elrhaz Formation in Niger. The holotype specimen, cataloged under the number MNHN GDF 366, consists of two premaxillae (frontmost snout bones), a partial right maxilla (main upper jaw bone), and a dentary fragment from the mandible. Several paratypes have been assigned: MNHN GDF 365, a snout of two articulated premaxillae; as well as MNHN GDF 357, 358, 359 and 361, four dorsal vertebrae. Two thumb claws from separate specimens were also subsequently attributed to Cristatusaurus. In 1984, the premaxilla specimens MNHN GDF 365 and 366 were first described in detail by Taquet, where he referred them to an unnamed new theropod within the family Spinosauridae, because of shared characteristics with the holotype dentary of Spinosaurus aegyptiacus. At the time Taquet believed these specimens belonged to the creature's lower jaw, since no theropod was known then with over five teeth in the premaxilla, while Cristatusaurus had seven. This was later proven incorrect in 1996 by Brazilian paleontologists Alexander Kellner and Diogenes Campos, in light of the discoveries of other spinosaurids preserving upper jaw tips with over five teeth.

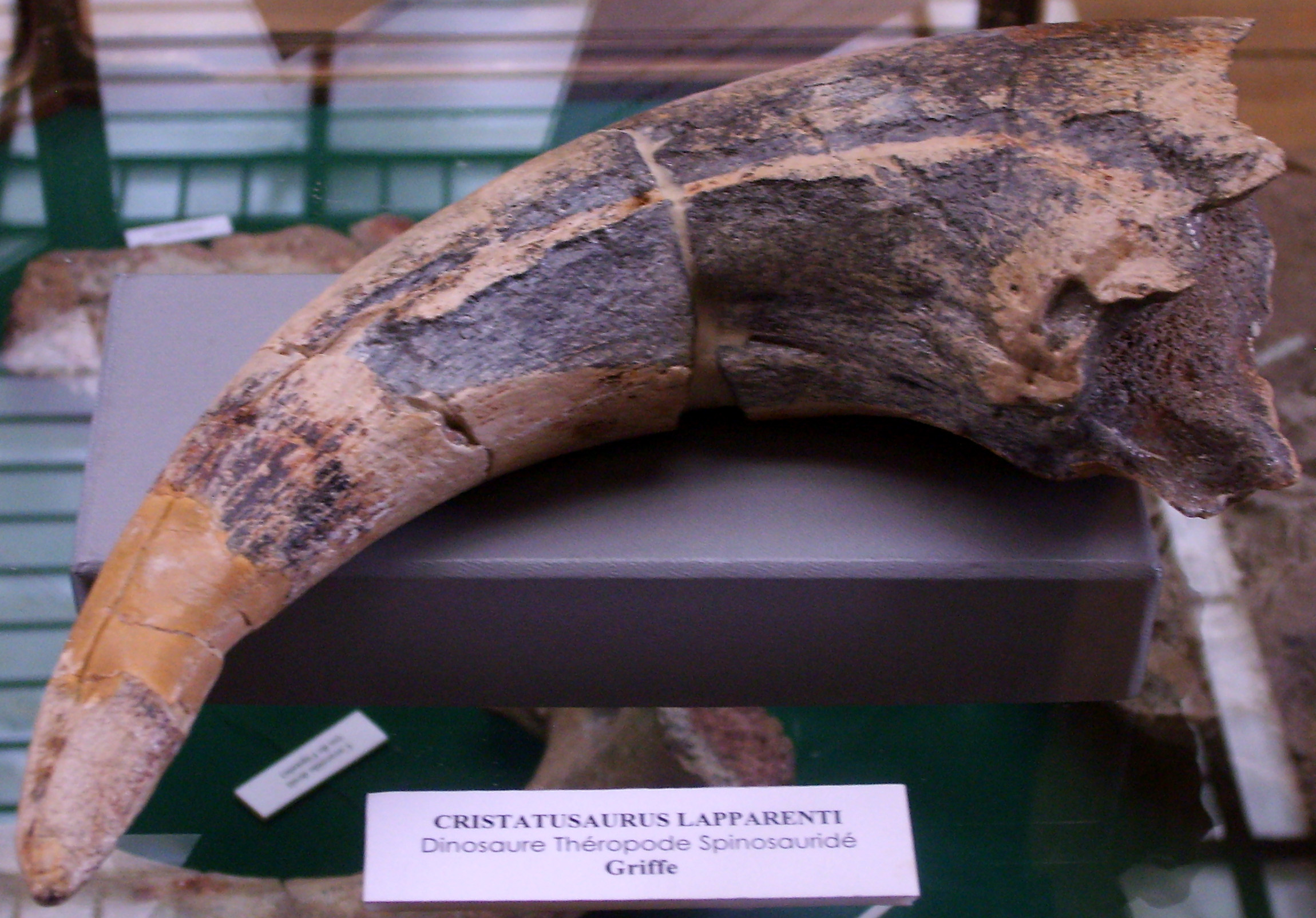
Referred claw, MNHN, Paris

In a 1986 publication, British paleontologists Alan Charig and Angela Milner considered Taquet's jaw elements nearly indistinguishable from those of the theropod Baryonyx walkeri; which they were describing on the basis of a partial skeleton from the Barremian of the Weald Clay Formation, England. A 1997 followup to this preliminary paper referred MNHN GDF 365 and 366 to an indeterminate Baryonyx species, regardless of their younger geological age. In 1998, Taquet and American geologist Dale Russell used the bones to erect the new genus Cristatusaurus, with the type species being Cristatusaurus lapparenti. Its generic name is derived from the Latin crista (for "crest"), and refers to a sagittal crest on the snout. The specific name honors the late French paleontologist Albert-Félix de Lapparent, due to his contributions to dinosaur-related discoveries in the Sahara. In the same paper, several skull and vertebral fossils from the Tademaït of Algeria were attributed to a new species of Spinosaurus called S. maroccanus, which was described and compared to Cristatusaurus. Spinosaurus maroccanus is now considered by most paleontologists either a nomen dubium (name of uncertain application) or one synonymous with S. aegyptiacus. More than two months after Taquet and Russel published their paper, another spinosaurid genus and species was named from the Erlhaz Formation, Suchomimus tenerensis. Its describers, the American paleontologist Paul Sereno and colleagues, agreed with Charig and Milner in that there was no distinction between the skull fossils of Baryonyx and Cristatusaurus; concluding that the latter was a nomen dubium. In a 2003 analysis, German paleontologist Oliver Rauhut concurred with this.

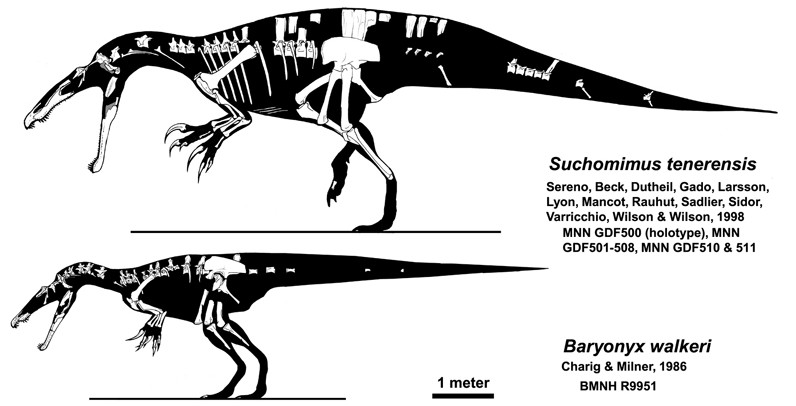
The fragmentary Cristatusaurus fossil material might represent the same taxon as Suchomimus (top) or Baryonyx (bottom)

When describing the taxon, Taquet and Russell based Cristatusaurus's separation from Baryonyx on the former's "brevirostrine condition of premaxilla" (having a short snout). The meaning of this diagnosis has been considered obscure by various subsequent authors, who describe the specimens as almost identical to those of Baryonyx and Suchomimus. In 2002, French paleontologist Éric Buffetaut and his Tunisian colleague Mohamed Ouaja supported Cristatusaurus's junior synonymy with Baryonyx. The same year, American paleontologist Hans-Dieter Sues and colleagues regarded both Cristatusaurus and Suchomimus as junior synonyms of Baryonyx, stating that there is no fossil evidence indicating more than one spinosaur lived in the Elrhaz Formation. More recent research has retained Suchomimus and Baryonyx as distinct genera. Others, such as Tor Bertin in 2010, and Matthew Carrano and colleagues in 2012, have referred to Cristatusaurus as an indeterminate baryonychine, because of how fragmentary its remains are.

In 2016, Christophe Hendrickx, Octávio Mateus, and Buffetaut noted that Taquet and Russel might have interpreted Cristatusaurus as having a shorter snout than Baryonyx by mistaking the notch where the maxillae articulated with the premaxillae for the nostril openings. Since both Suchomimus and Baryonyx have more completely preserved premaxillae, while Cristatusaurus only has the frontmost part of this bone known, Hendrickx and colleagues considered it possible that Cristatusaurus's snout was just as long as in Baryonyx. Therefore, they agreed with previous authors in the ambiguity of Taquet and Russel's diagnosis. Hendrickx and colleagues stated that since Cristatusaurus and Suchomimus are nearly identical and both hail from the same stratigraphic unit, they are almost certainly synonyms. The researchers found Cristatusaurus and Suchomimus similar in that they both had premaxillary crests, similar size ratio of tooth sockets, and shallow depressions in front of their nostril openings. However, since these features are minor and may vary within species as well as depending on age and sex, Hendrickx and colleagues did not identify any definitive autapomorphies (distinguishing features) of Cristatusaurus's holotype, and thus considered the taxon a nomen dubium until its postcranial remains are more closely examined. Given that it was named first, Cristatusaurus lapparenti has priority over Suchomimus tenerensis in the case that they become synonymized.

In a 2017 study, Brazilian paleontologists Marcos Sales and Cesar Schultz compared the holotype of Cristatusaurus (MNHN GDF 366) to the referred snout of Suchomimus (MNN GDF501). Both of them exhibit a narrow rim across the top of their premaxillae. However, Cristatusaurus's convex secondary palate is clearly visible in side view (situated under the premaxillary teeth), whereas in Suchomimus it is discernible only through cracks on the fossil snout. It was also pointed out that where known, the upward-sloping process of Cristatusaurus's maxilla is narrower than in Suchomimus. The researchers concluded that further study is needed to determine whether these differences are possible autapomorphies (distinguishing features) between the taxa, or if they are the result of ontogenetic (developmental) changes, given that the Cristatusaurus holotype represents a younger individual.

== Description ==
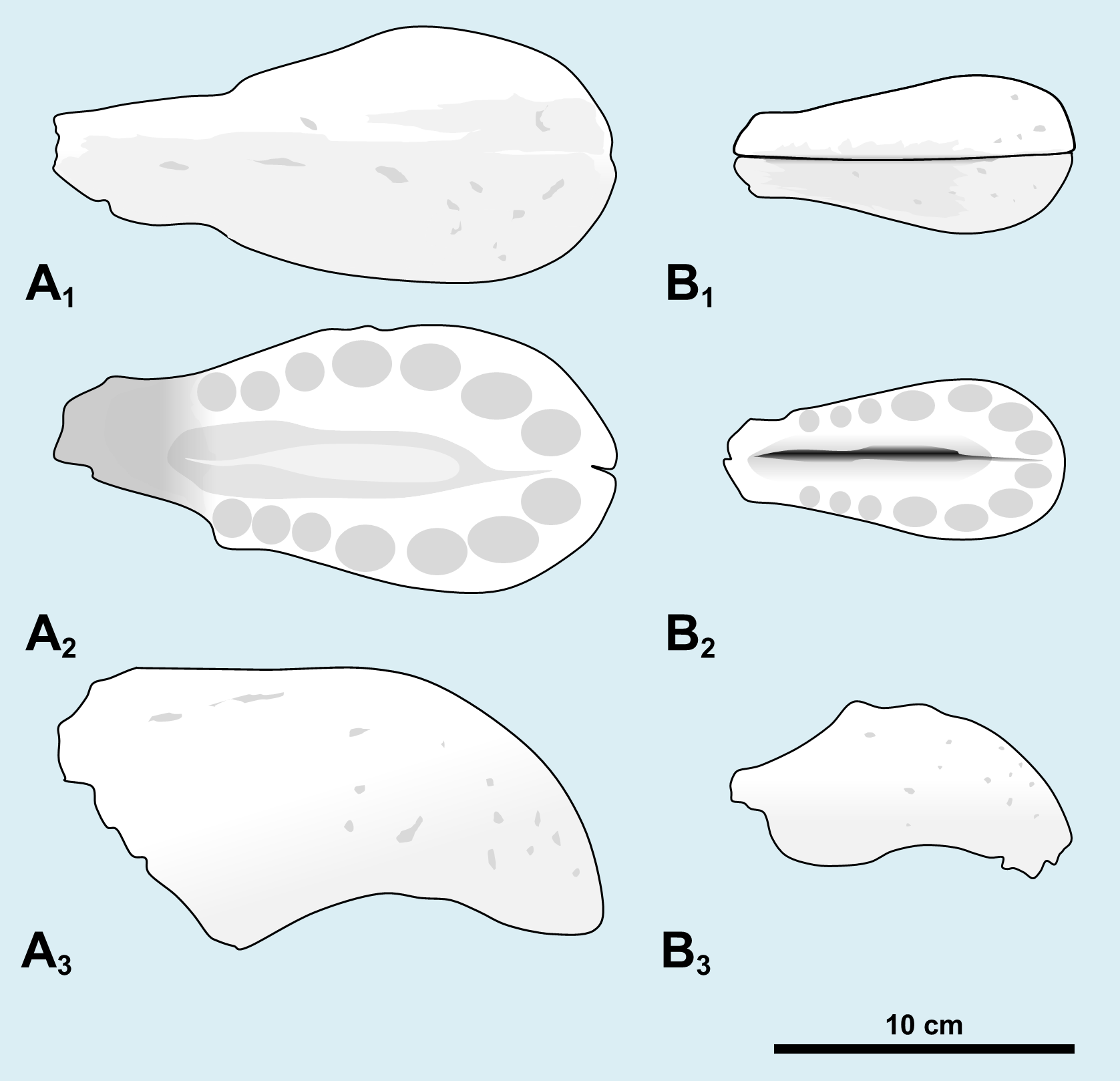
Diagram showing the differences between an adult (A) and juvenile (B) Cristatusaurus premaxilla

In 2012, American vertebrate paleontologist Thomas R. Holtz Jr. tentatively estimated Cristatusaurus at around 10 m (33 ft) in length and weighing between 1 and 4 tonnes (1.1 and 4.4 short tons). The holotype premaxillae are 115 mm (4.5 in) long and 55 mm (2.2 in) tall. The other known set of premaxillae (specimen MNHN GDF 365) are larger at 185 mm (7.3 in) long and 95 mm (3.7 in) tall. The holotype's smaller size, smoother surface, and lack of co-ossified (fused) sutures all indicate that it belongs to a juvenile individual; while MNHN GDF 365 probably represents an adult.

The tip of Cristatusaurus's premaxilla was short and expanded, while the rear end was narrowed near the suture with the maxilla; this rosette-like snout shape was characteristic of spinosaurids. The front of the upper jaw was concave on the bottom, shaped to interlock with what would have been the convex and also enlarged tip of the mandible's dentary bone. A thin sagittal crest ran lengthwise on top of the premaxillae, a condition present in Baryonyx and Suchomimus, and very prominent in Angaturama (a possible synonym of Irritator). Like all spinosaurids, Cristatusaurus's external nares (bony nostrils) were positioned further back on the skull that in typical theropods. Two bony processes extended across the underside of the snout, in a convex structure that formed the animal's secondary palate. This condition is observed in all extant crocodilians, but not in most theropod dinosaurs; however, it was a common trait among spinosaurids.

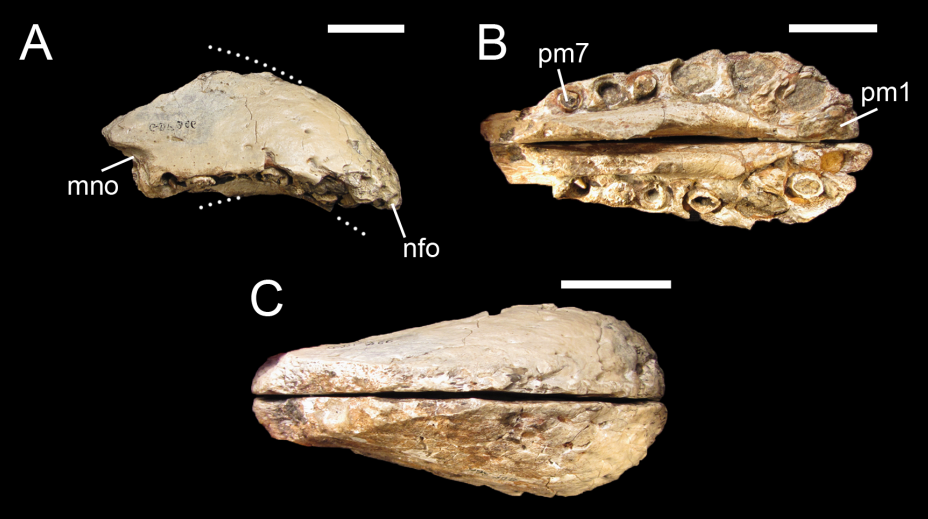
Type premaxillae from reversed left side (A), bottom (B), and top (C) views

Cristatusaurus's dental alveoli (tooth sockets) were closely spaced, those in the maxilla and dentary were flattened somewhat sideways; while the ones in the premaxillae were large and mostly circular, with the frontmost alveoli being the largest. Partial tooth crowns preserved in some alveoli show that the teeth were finely serrated, with flutes (lengthwise ridges) on their lingual (inward-facing side of teeth) surface. Both premaxilla specimens had seven alveoli on each side, the same number as in Suchomimus, Angaturama, Oxalaia, and the specimen referred to Spinosaurus maroccanus . A 2026 study also found evidence of a highly developed neurovascular system on Cristatusaurus's premaxilla and evidence of a high tooth replacement rate from a young age.

One of the dorsal vertebrae (MNHN GDF 358) measured 13.5 cm (5.3 in) in centrum length, which is equal to the largest known vertebrae of the contreversial Spinosaurus maroccanus. The preserved base of one of Cristatusaurus's vertebral neural spines (MNHN GDF 359) was 15 mm (0.59 in) thick in comparison to the 25 mm (0.98 in) measurement seen in an equivalent Spinosaurus vertebra, indicating that Cristatusaurus's neural spines were probably not as tall as those of Spinosaurus. Of the two manual unguals (claws) referred to Cristatusaurus, one was equivalent in size to those found for Suchomimus and Baryonyx, while the other was about 25 to 30 percent smaller. As a spinosaur, it would have wielded these claws with three-fingered hands carried by robust arms.

== Classification ==
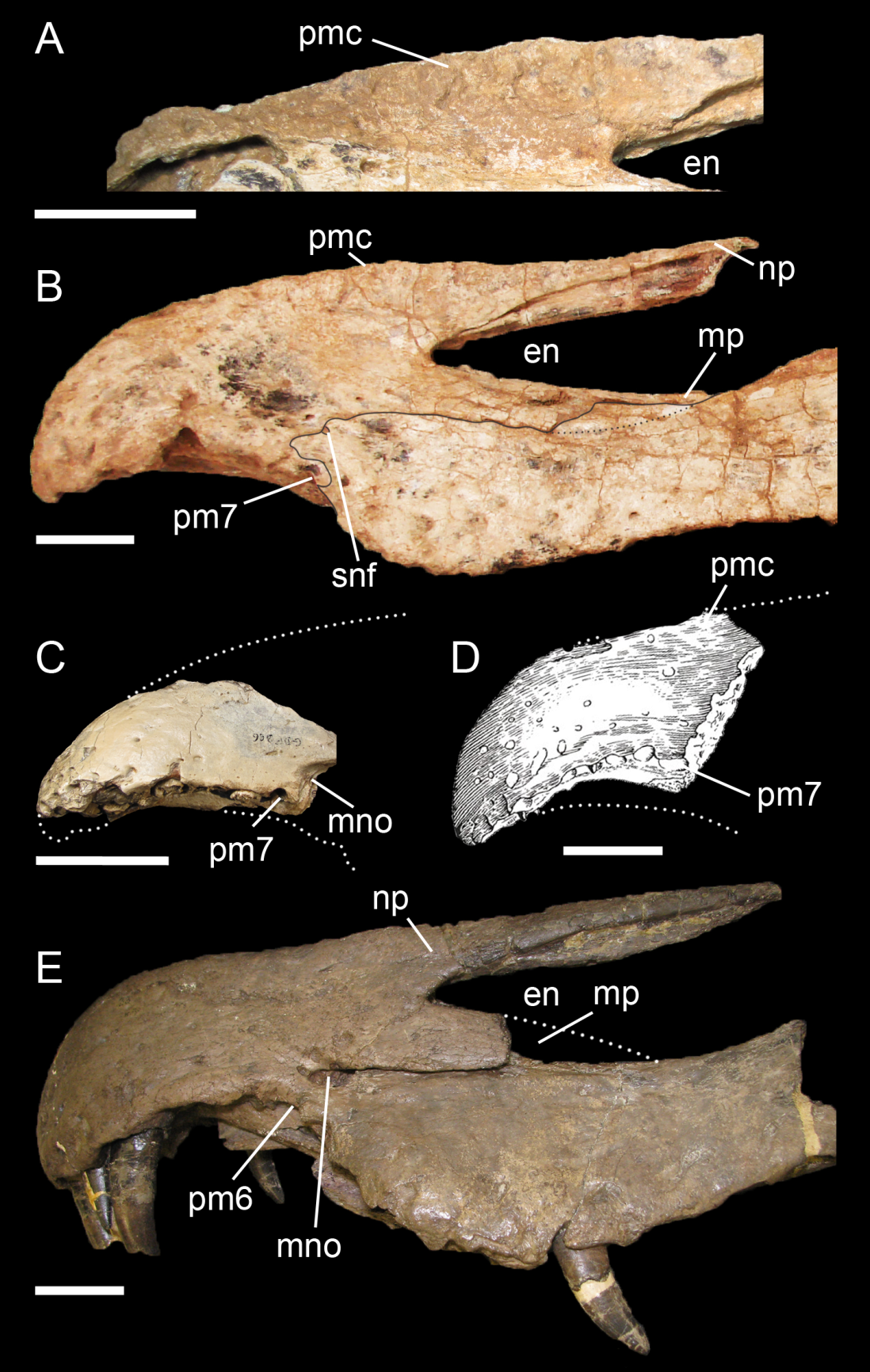
Comparison between snout fossils of Suchomimus (A, B), Cristatusaurus (C, D), and Baryonyx (E)

Spinosaurids were large bipedal carnivores with well-built forelimbs and elongated, crocodile-like skulls. The taxonomic and phylogenetic affinities of the group are subject to active research and debate, given that in comparison to other theropod groups, many of the family's taxa (including Cristatusaurus) are based on relatively poor fossil material. Traditionally the family has been divided into two subfamilies: Spinosaurinae, which includes genera like Irritator, Spinosaurus, and Oxalaia; and Baryonychinae, which includes Baryonyx and Suchomimus. Although the genus and species placement of Cristatusaurus lapparenti is disputed, its fossils certainly belong to a member of the baryonychinae, because of its more forwardly placed external nostrils; relatively larger first premaxillary teeth; and more closely spaced tooth sockets than in spinosaurines; as well as the presence of fine serrations, in contrast to spinosaurines lacking them entirely. However, authors like Sales and Schultz have questioned the monophyly of Baryonychinae (meaning it might be an unnatural group), stating that the South American spinosaurids Angaturama and Irritator represent intermediate forms between Baryonychinae and Spinosaurinae, based on their craniodental (skull and tooth) features. In a 2021 paper, Brazilian paleontologists Mauro Lacerda, Orlando Grillo and Pedro Romano recovered the two subfamilies as distinct. However, while the authors agreed with Sales and Schultz on the validity of Cristatusaurus, their study recovered this genus as a basal spinosaurid positioned just outside the Baryonychinae and Spinosaurinae. Their cladogram can be seen below.

- Spinosauridae
  - Cristatusaurus
  - - Baryonychinae
      - Suchomimus
      - Baryonyx
    - Spinosaurinae
      - Angaturama
      - - Oxalaia
        - - MSNM V4047 (Spinosaurus)
          - Irritator

== Palaeobiology ==
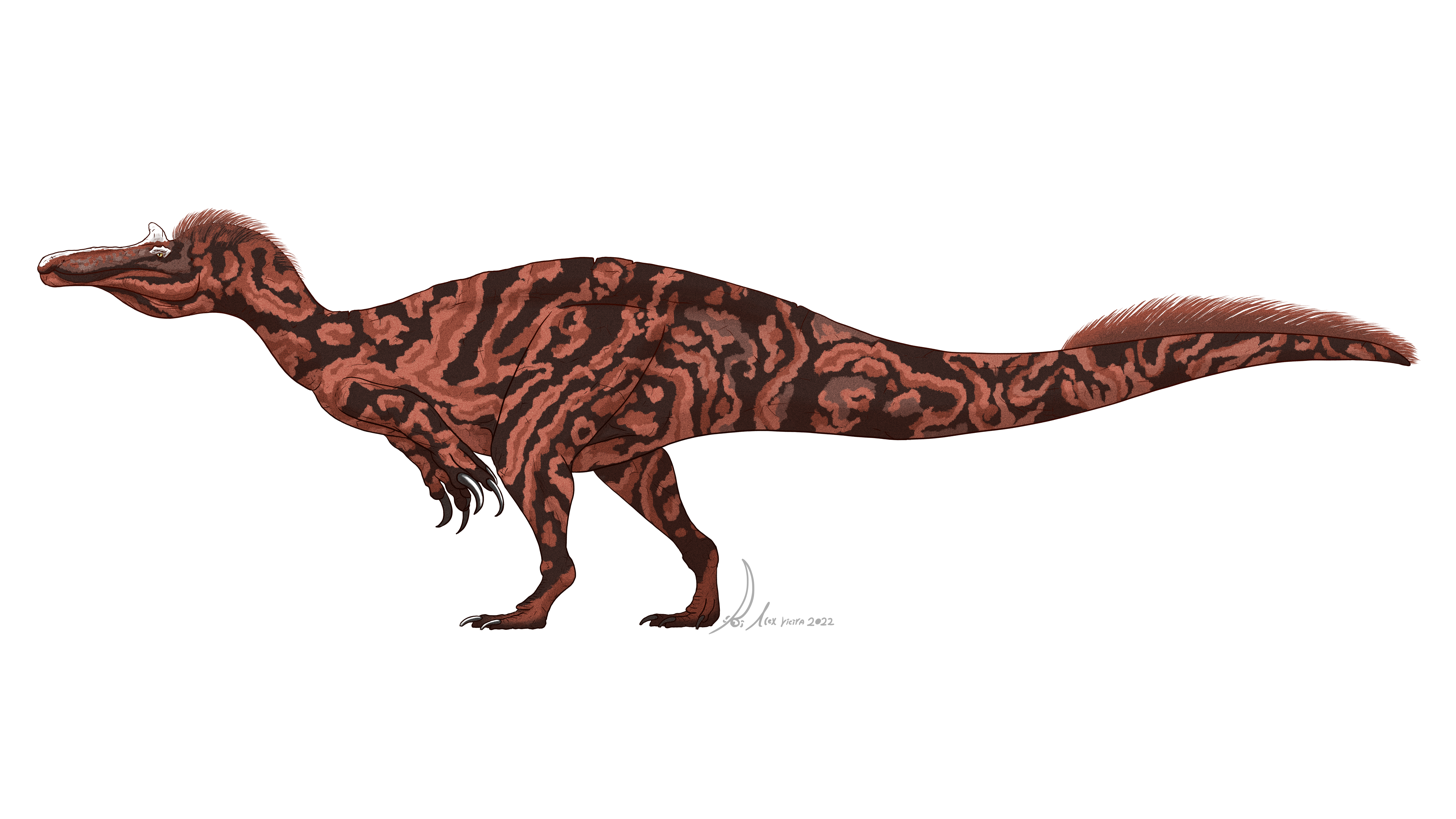
Speculative life restoration

A semiaquatic lifestyle has been proposed for many spinosaurids, on account of their unusual anatomical traits and bone histology. Cristatusaurus's teeth would have likely been used for piercing and gripping prey items, rather than slicing flesh, as indicated by their subcircular cross section and reduced serrations. Its teeth, combined with the sinusoidal (wave-like) curvature of the jaws, would have performed as tan efficient trap for fish. The retracted nostrils would have allowed it to submerge its snout further underwater than most theropods, while still being able to breathe; and the bony secondary palate is theorized to have reinforced the skull against bending stresses when feeding. The use of the giant recurved manual unguals of spinosaurs is still under debate; suggested functions have ranged from gaffing aquatic prey out of the water, to scavenging carcasses or digging.

== Paleoecology ==
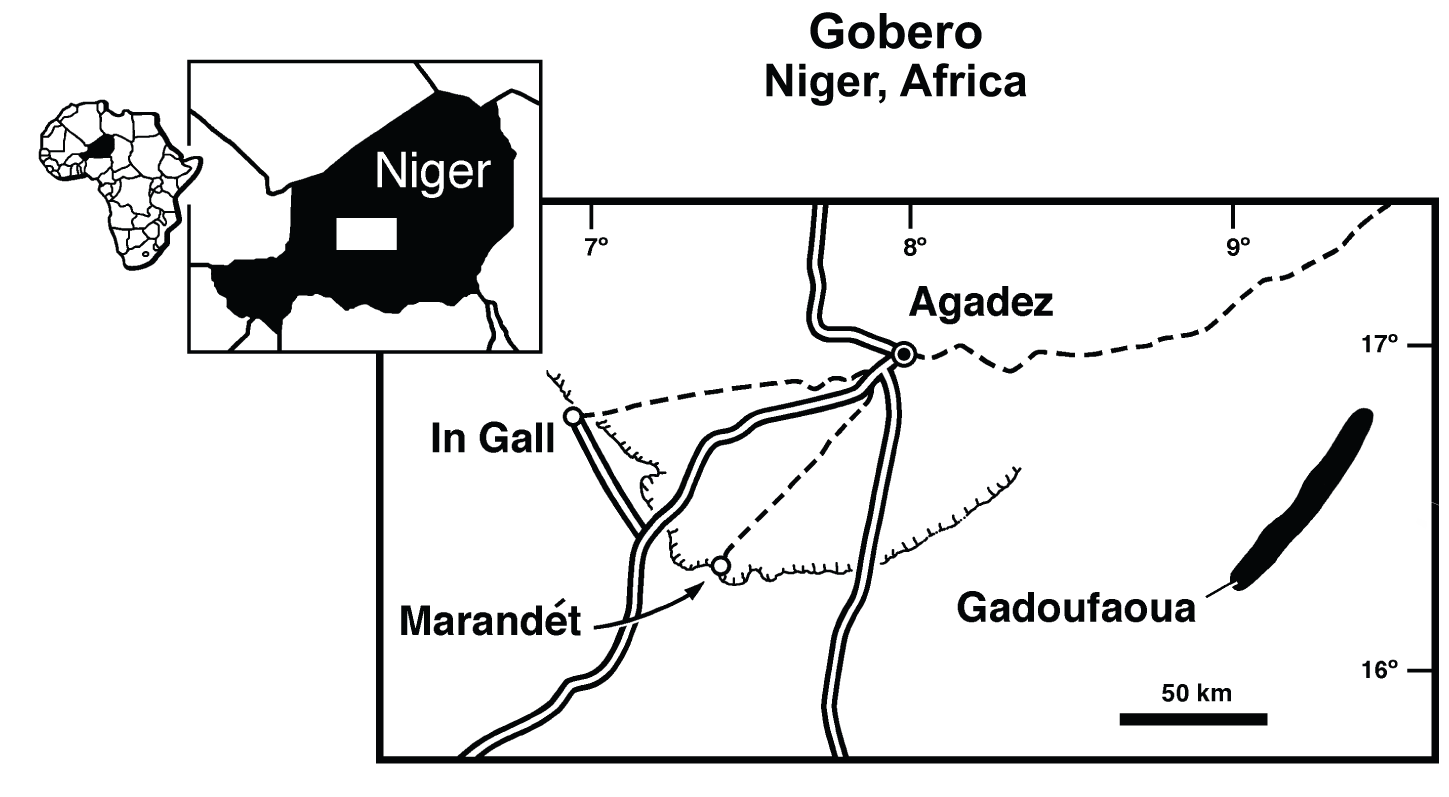
Outcrops of the Erlhaz Formation, (Gadoufaoua in lower right)

The Elrhaz Formation, part of the Tegama Group, consists mainly of fluvial sandstones with low relief, much of which is obscured by sand dunes. The sediments are coarse- to medium-grained, with almost no fine-grained horizons. Cristatusaurus lived in what is now Niger, during the late Aptian to early Albian stages of the Early Cretaceous Period, 112 million years ago. The sediment layers of the formation have been interpreted as an inland habitat of extensive freshwater floodplains and fast-moving rivers, with a tropical climate that likely experienced seasonal dry periods.

This environment was home to a variety of fauna including dinosaurs, pterosaurs, chelonians, fish, hybodont sharks, and freshwater bivalves. Besides Cristatusaurus lapparenti and Suchomimus tenerensis, theropods such as the abelisaurid Kryptops palaios, the carcharodontosaurid Eocarcharia dinops (likely a chimaera including spinosaurid bones) and the noasaurid Afromimus tenerensis have been found. Herbivorous dinosaurs of the region included iguanodontians like Ouranosaurus nigeriensis, Elrhazosaurus nigeriensis, Lurdusaurus arenatus, and two sauropods: Nigersaurus taqueti, and an unnamed titanosaur. Crocodylomorphs were abundant; represented by the giant pholidosaur species Sarcosuchus imperator, as well as small notosuchians like Anatosuchus minor, Araripesuchus wegeneri, and Stolokrosuchus lapparenti. The local flora probably consisted mainly of ferns, horsetails, and angiosperms, based on the dietary adaptations of the sauropods that lived there.
