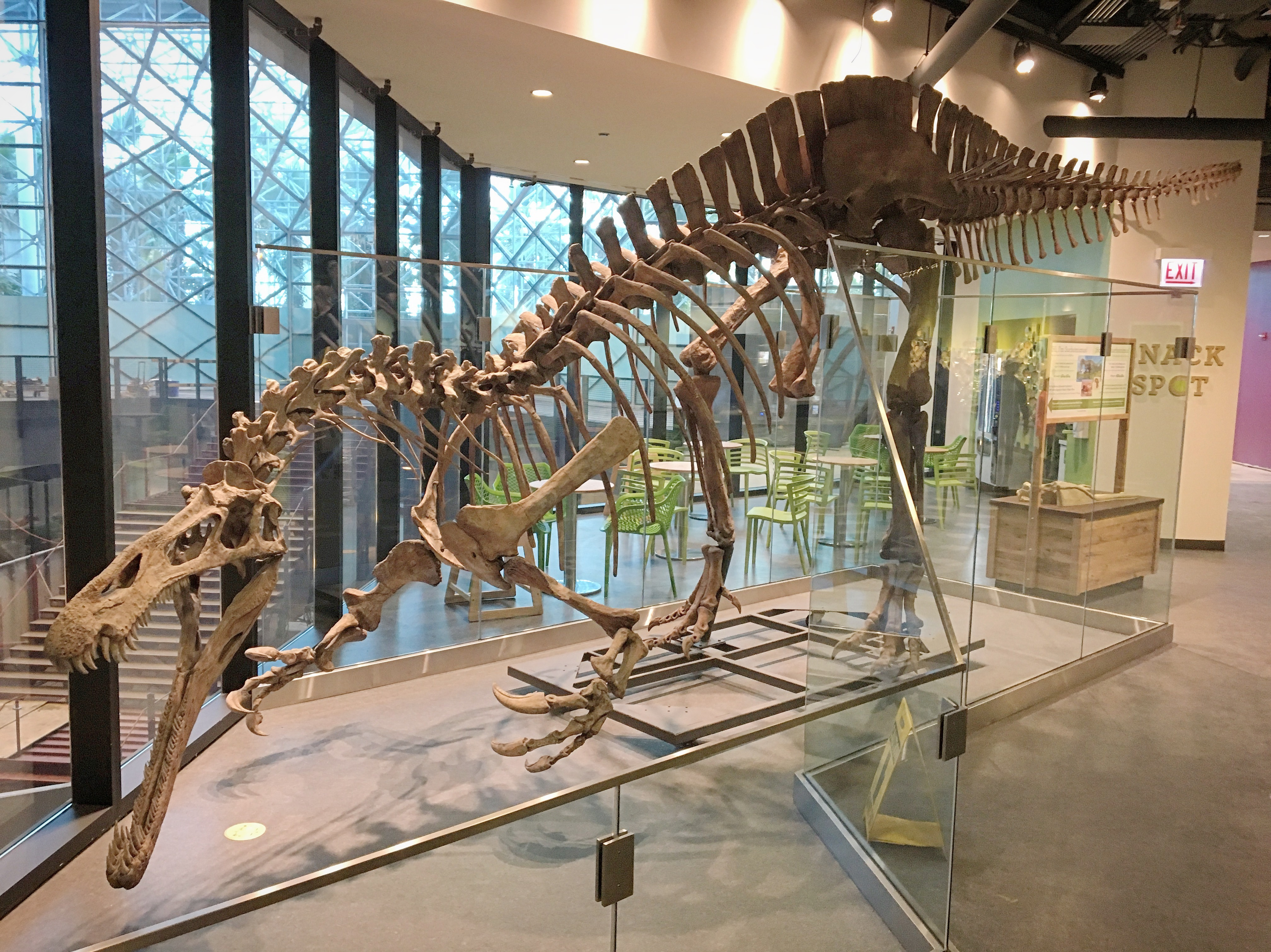
- Reconstructed skeleton at the Chicago Children's Museum

Scientific classification
- Kingdom: Animalia
- Phylum: Chordata
- Class: Reptilia
- Clade: Dinosauria
- Clade: Saurischia
- Clade: Theropoda
- Family: †Spinosauridae
- Clade: †Ceratosuchopsini
- Genus: †Suchomimus; Sereno et al., 1998

Type species
- †Suchomimus tenerensis Sereno et al., 1998

Synonyms
- Cristatusaurus lapparenti? Taquet & Russell, 1998; Baryonyx tenerensis (Sues et al., 2002)

= Suchomimus =

Suchomimus Temporal range: Early Cretaceous (Aptian-Albian), ~112 Ma

Extinct genus of dinosaurs

Suchomimus is a genus of large theropod dinosaur that lived in what is now Niger during the Aptian to Albian stages of the Early Cretaceous period, 112 million years ago. The only known species is S. tenerensis, originally described in 1998 by paleontologist Paul Sereno and colleagues from several fossils discovered one year earlier in the Elrhaz Formation. Although these fossils come from multiple specimens, they represent one of the most anatomically well-documented spinosaurids. The animal's generic name, which means "crocodile mimic", alludes to its elongated skull and piscivorous adaptations, while the specific name refers to the Ténéré Desert, where the fossils were discovered.

As its generic name suggests, the animal’s skull was elongated, low, and narrow, resembling that of crocodilians. The tip of the snout flared laterally to form a rosette, and the jaws bore numerous finely serrated conical teeth, with the largest ones positioned near the front. The neck of Suchomimus was relatively short, while its powerfully built forelimbs bore a large, curved claw on each thumb. Along the midline of the animal's back ran a low dorsal sail, built from the long neural spines of its vertebrae. Its cranial and limb features indicate that it was a primarily piscivorous predator adapted for hunting in shallow waters.

Some paleontologists consider Suchomimus to be a junior synonym of the contemporaneous spinosaurid Cristatusaurus, although the latter taxon is based on fragmentary remains. Yet more have also suggested that Suchomimus might represent an African species of the European spinosaurid Baryonyx, and it has occasionally been referred to in the scientific literature as B. tenerensis. However, more recent studies continue to regard the two genera as distinct. According to the fossil record of the Elrhaz Formation, Suchomimus lived and hunted in a fluvial environment of vast floodplains alongside many other dinosaurs, in addition to pterosaurs, crocodylomorphs, bony fishes, turtles, and bivalves.

== History of study ==
=== Discovery and naming ===
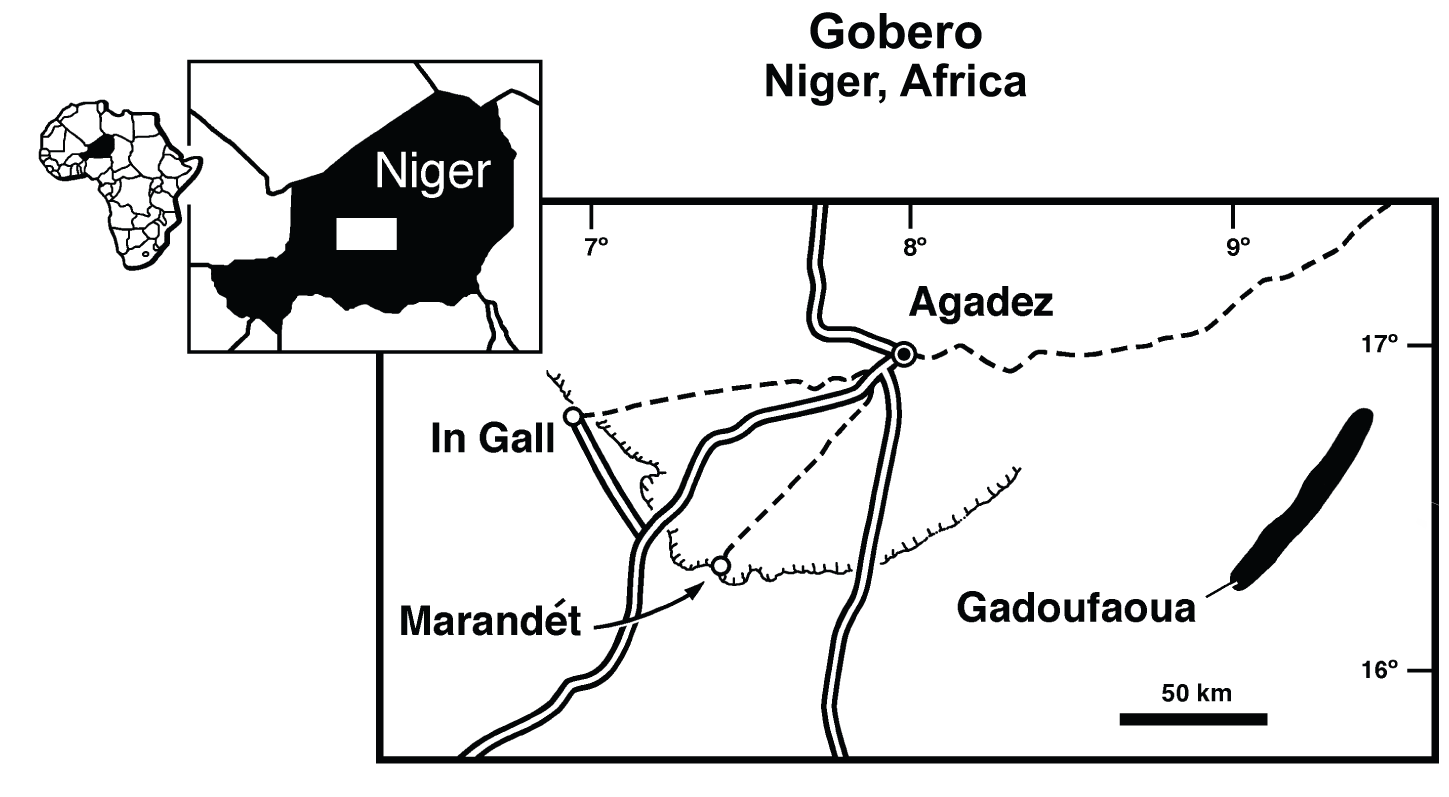
Outcrops of the Erlhaz Formation (Gadoufaoua in lower right)

In late 1997, American paleontologist Paul Sereno and his team conducted an expedition at the Gadoufaoua site in the Ténéré Desert of Niger, where they uncovered various fossils. On 4 December, team member David Varricchio discovered a large thumb claw belonging to a massive theropod dinosaur, remarkably well exposed on the surface. According to Sereno, the sand and wind had gradually revealed this claw, which had remained visible in this state for at least two centuries. Subsequent excavations at the site recovered several fossils from different individuals of this enigmatic theropod, which proved to belong to the spinosaurid family. On 13 November 1998, the Science Magazine published a study led by Sereno, formally naming and describing the new genus and species Suchomimus tenerensis based on the fossils discovered during the expedition. The generic name Suchomimus derives from the Ancient Greek σοῦχος (souchos, "crocodile"), and μῖμος (mimos, "mimic") literally meaning "crocodile mimic", in reference to its elongated snout and piscivorous adaptations. The specific name tenerensis refers to the desert where the animal’s fossils were found.

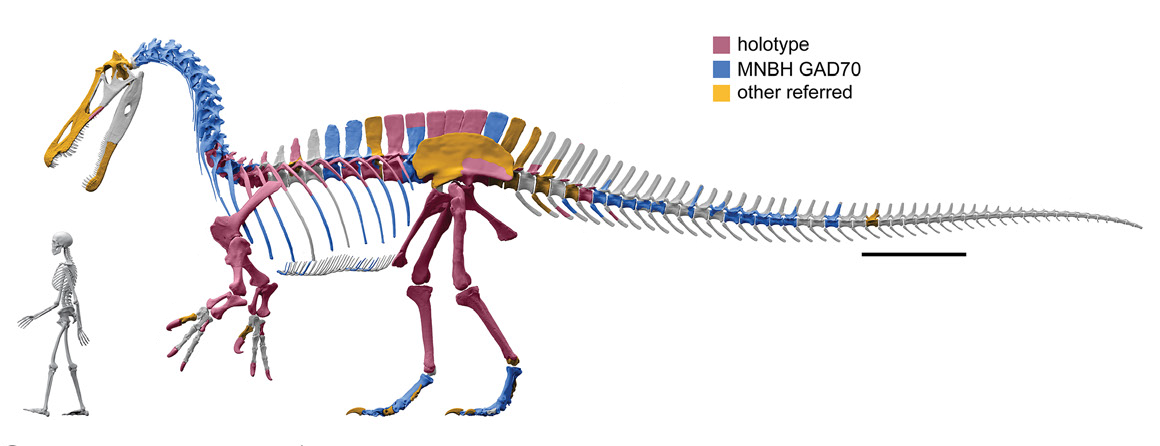
Digital reconstruction of the Suchomimus skeleton showing known bones based on the holotype (in red), a partial skeleton (in blue), and other referred specimens (in yellow).

All known fossil specimens were recovered from the Elrhaz Formation and are now housed in the paleontological collections of the Musée National Boubou Hama in Niamey. The holotype, catalogued as MNN GDF500, consists of a partial skeleton lacking the skull. It contains three neck ribs, parts of fourteen dorsal (back) vertebrae, ten dorsal ribs, gastralia (or "belly ribs"), pieces of three sacral vertebrae, parts of twelve caudal (tail) vertebrae, chevrons (bones that form the underside of the tail), a scapula (shoulder blade), a coracoid, a partial forelimb, most of the pelvis (hip bone), and parts of a hindlimb. Other notable specimens are also mentioned in the paper describing the taxon. Specimens MNN GDF 501 to 508 include a snout, a quadrate from the back of the skull, three dentaries (tooth-bearing bones of the lower jaw), an axis (second neck vertebra), a rear cervical vertebra, and a rear dorsal vertebra. Specimens MNN GDF510 and 511 consist of two caudal vertebrae. In the same article, Sereno and colleagues also reported additional bones and teeth attributed to this dinosaur, though their catalogue numbers were not specified. Although Suchomimus is among the best-known spinosaurids anatomically, its original description remains relatively brief.

=== Suggested synonymy with Baryonyx and Cristatusaurus ===
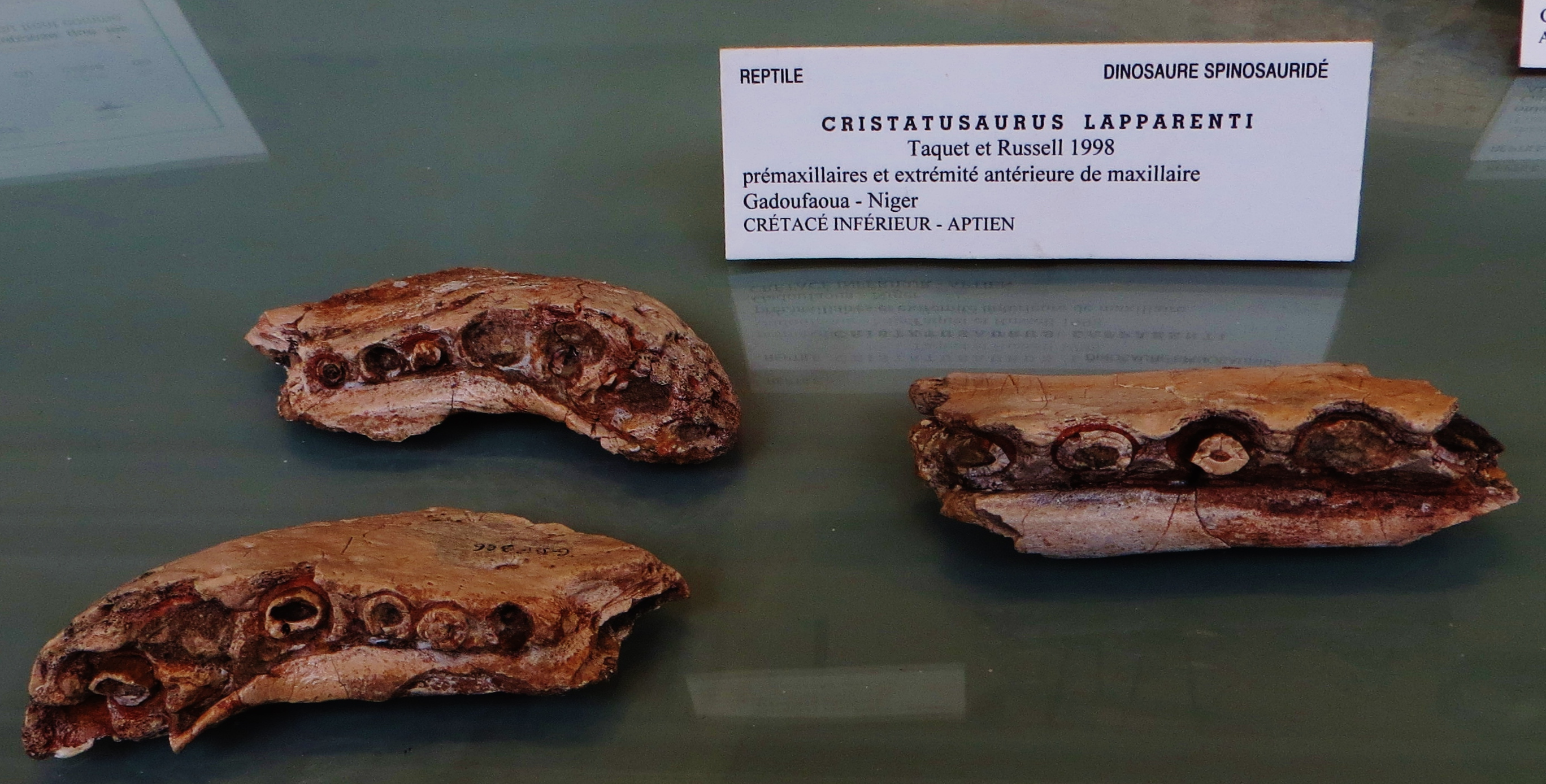
Fragmentary jaw elements from the holotype specimen of Cristatusaurus, on display at the Muséum national d'Histoire naturelle in Paris

More than two months before S. tenerensis was formally described in the scientific literature, French paleontologist Philippe Taquet and his Canadian colleague Dale A. Russell named another spinosaurid from the Elrhaz Formation, Cristatusaurus lapparenti, based on fragments of jaws and vertebrae. The fossils of this taxon were first discovered in 1973 by Taquet at Gadoufaoua, who later reported the find and described the fossil premaxillae in a paper published in 1984. Although he did not assign them a scientific name at the time, the author recognized the fossils as belonging to a large theropod of the Spinosauridae family based on anatomical features shared with the now-destroyed holotype of Spinosaurus aegyptiacus. In a 1986 publication, British paleontologists Alan Charig and Angela Milner noted that the jaw elements described by Taquet were nearly indistinguishable from those of Baryonyx walkeri, which they had just described from a partial skeleton dating to the Barremian stage of the Weald Clay Formation in England. In a 1997 follow-up to their preliminary paper, the same authors referred Taquet’s fossils to an indeterminate species of Baryonyx, despite their younger geological age. In their 1998 paper, Sereno and colleagues agreed with Charig and Milner that there were no significant differences between the fossil skulls of Baryonyx and Cristatusaurus, concluding that the latter should be regarded as a nomen dubium.

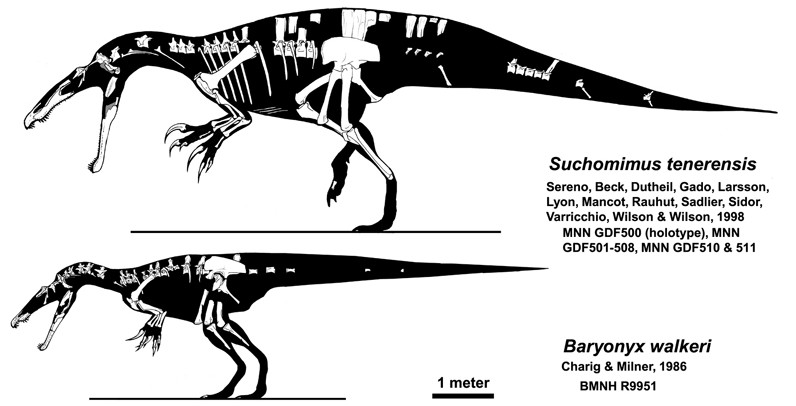
Skeletal diagram combining several specimens of Suchomimus (above) with the holotype of the closely related genus Baryonyx

In 2002, French paleontologist Éric Buffetaut and his Tunisian colleague Mohamed Ouaja expressed support for the proposed synonymy between Cristatusaurus and Baryonyx, noting that Milner had acknowledged the possibility that Suchomimus might also be congeneric with Baryonyx with later anatomical comparisons. The same year, American paleontologist Hans-Dieter Sues and colleagues concluded that S. tenerensis was sufficiently similar to B. walkeri to be placed within the same genus, renamed as Baryonyx tenerensis, and that it was likely identical to Cristatusaurus. These interpretations were also concurred by Milner in 2003. In a conference abstract released the following year, American paleontologist Stephen Hutt and British researcher Penny Newbery also supported the synonymy based on a large theropod vertebra discovered on the Isle of Wight, England, which they attributed to an animal closely related to these two taxa. Nevertheless, subsequent studies have continued to treat Suchomimus and Baryonyx as separate genera. A 2017 review paper by the Brazilian palaeontologist Carlos Roberto A. Candeiro and colleagues stated that this debate was more in the realm of semantics than science, as it is generally agreed that Suchomimus and Baryonyx are distinct, related genera. As for the validity of Cristatusaurus, it continues to be disputed in recent studies. This taxon is generally regarded as a likely senior synonym of Suchomimus, as both originate from the same stratigraphic units and show no sufficiently distinct anatomical differences to justify a clear separation between them. Thus, Cristatusaurus is currently considered as a nomen dubium, pending further analyses that could clarify its taxonomic position. However, in the event that the synonymy between the two genera is confirmed, nomenclatural priority would normally be given to C. lapparenti, as it was described earlier than S. tenerensis.

== Description ==
Size comparison of various spinosaurids (Suchomimus in magenta, second from right) with a human

The size of Suchomimus was historically estimated at 9.5–11 metres (31–36 ft) in length, with a weight of 2.5–3.8 metric tons (2.8–4.2 short tons). In 2007, Canadian paleontologists François Therrien and Donald M. Henderson proposed that a 10.3 metres (34 ft) long Suchomimus would have weighed more than 5.2 metric tons (5.7 short tons) based on their ratio between skull length and body length; however, they noted that they might have overestimated the size of spinosaurids (i.e., Suchomimus and Baryonyx). A 2025 study led by the British paleontologist by Matthew Dempsey and colleagues suggested a body weight of 5.3 metric tons (5.8 short tons) for the holotype.

=== Skull ===
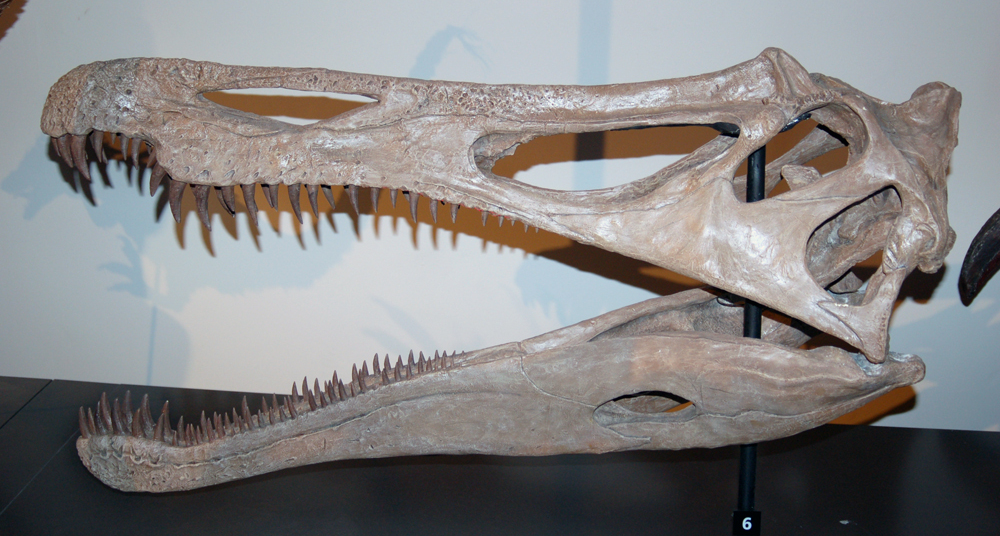
S. tenerensis skull reconstruction at the Australian Museum, Sydney

The skull of Suchomimus is estimated at around 1.2 metres (3.9 ft) in length. Unlike most large theropod dinosaurs, Suchomimus had a very crocodilian-like skull, with a long, low snout and narrow jaws formed by a forward expansion of the premaxillae (frontmost snout bones) and the hind branch of the maxillae (main upper jaw bone). The premaxillae had an upward branch, excluding the maxillae from the external nares (bony nostrils). The jaws had about 122 conical teeth, pointed but not very sharp and curving slightly backwards, with fine serrations and wrinkled enamel. The tip of the snout was enlarged sideways and carried a "terminal rosette" of longer teeth, seven per side in the premaxillae and about the same number in the corresponding part of the lower jaw. Further back, there were at least 22 teeth per upper jaw side in the maxilla, while the entire lower jaw side carried 32 teeth in the dentary bone.

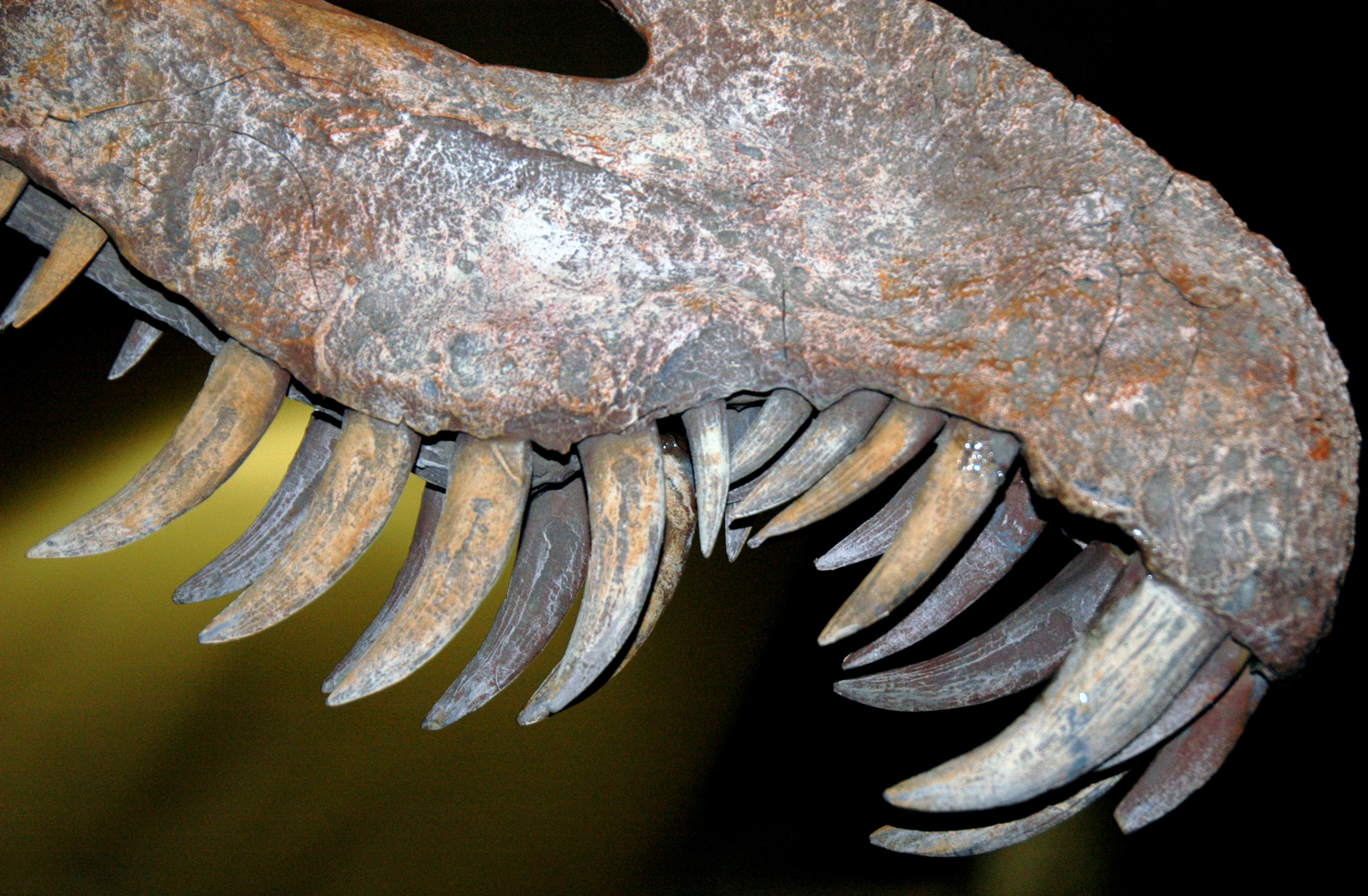
Closeup of front of the snout and dentition

The upper jaw had a prominent kink just behind the rosette, protruding downwards; this convexly curved part of the maxilla had the longest teeth of the entire skull. The internal bone shelves of the maxillae met each other in the midline of the skull over a long distance, forming a closed secondary palate that stiffened the snout and setting off the internal nostrils and palatal complex (including the pterygoid, palatine, and ectopterygoid) towards the back of the skull. The nostrils, unlike in most theropods, were retracted further back on the skull and behind the premaxillary teeth. The external nares were long, narrow, and horizontally positioned; the same was true of the larger antorbital fenestrae, a pair of bony openings in front of the eyes. The rear of the skull is poorly known but for a short quadrate bone, which had broad condyles (round protrusions) away from the centre of attachment and—like in the spinosaurid Baryonyx—had a large foramen (opening) separating it from the quadratojugal bone. The lower jaws were greatly elongated and narrow, forming a rigid structure as their dentaries touched each other at the midline, reinforcing the mandible against torsional (bending and twisting) forces.

=== Postcranial skeleton ===
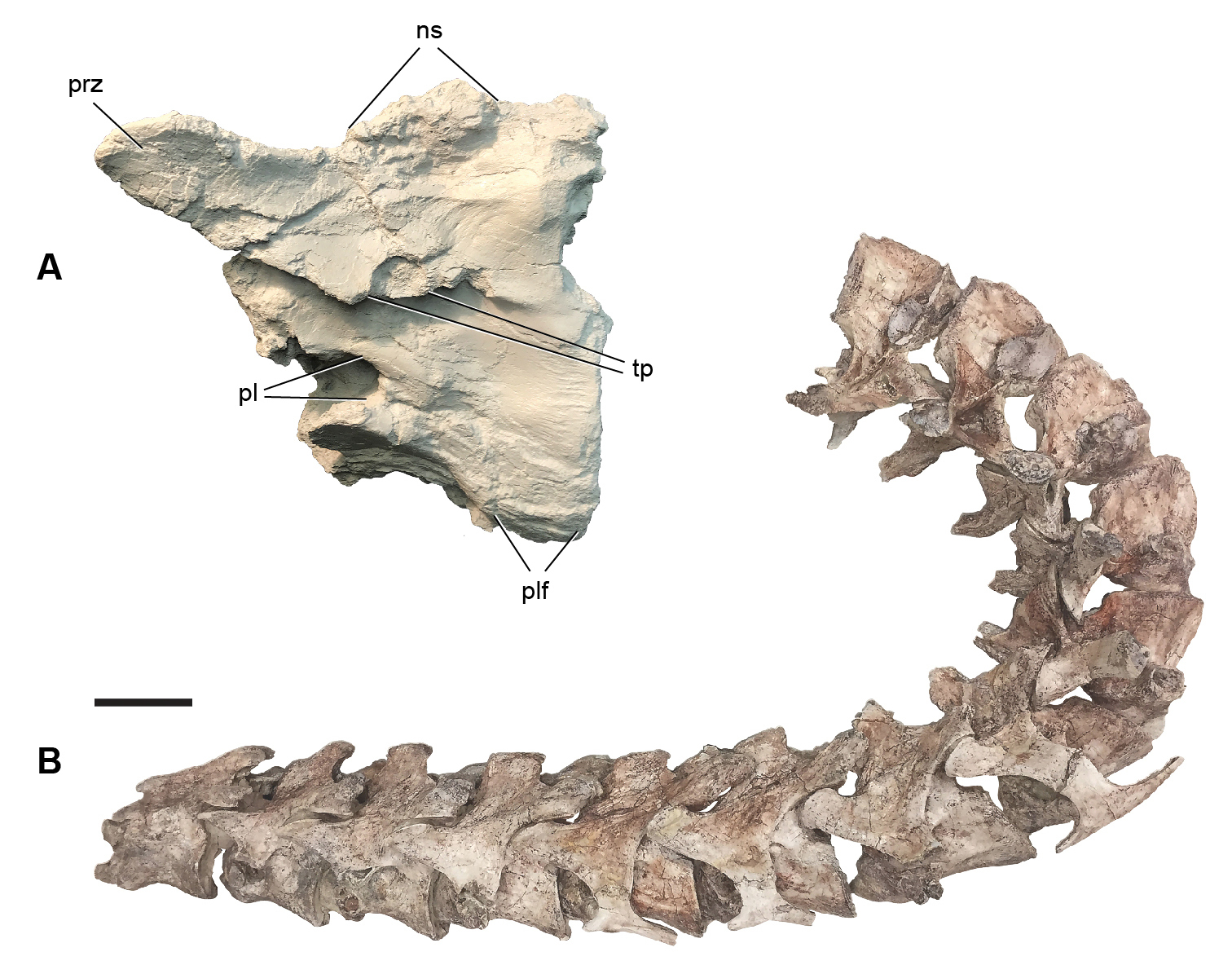
Articulated series of neck vertebrae of Suchomimus (B) compared to a single, fragmentary vertebra of Spinosaurus with annotations (A)

The neck was relatively short but well-muscled as shown by strong epipophyses (processes to which neck muscles attached). There were about sixteen dorsal vertebrae. Suchomimus had significantly extended neural spines—blade-shaped upward extensions on the vertebrae—which were elongated at the rear back. Those of the five sacral vertebrae were the longest. The elongation of these structures continued until the middle of the tail. The spines may have held up some kind of low crest or sail of skin that was highest over its hips, lower and extending further to the back than that of Spinosaurus, in which the sail reached its highest peak over the dorsal vertebrae. This condition was more reduced in Baryonyx. The furcula was V-shaped and indicates a high and narrow trunk.

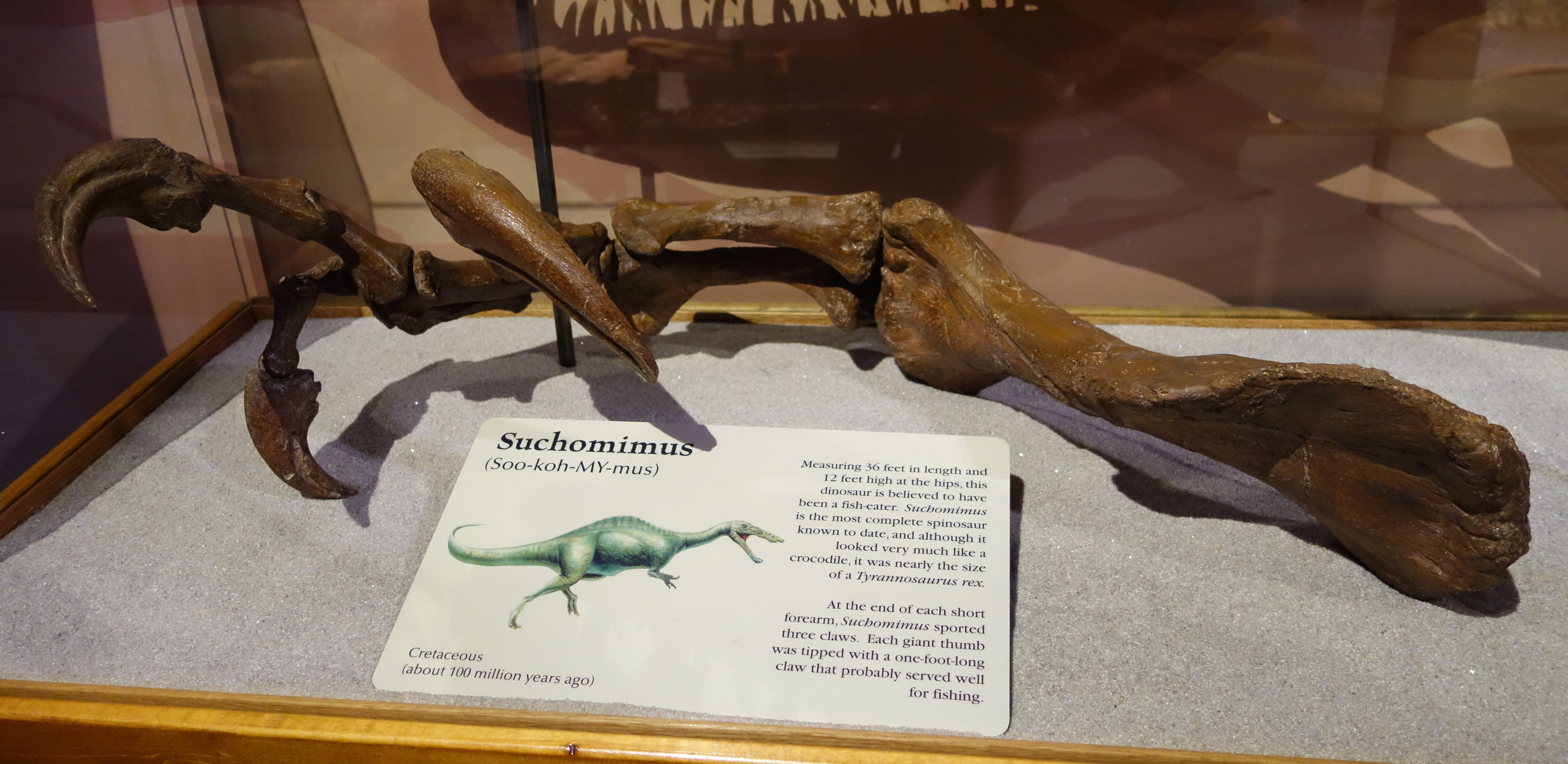
Reconstructed forelimb and hand of Suchomimus, Museum of Ancient Life, Utah

The scapula had a rectangular acromion, or attachment site for clavicle (collarbone). The humerus (upper arm bone) was very strongly built, only equaled in size among non-spinosaurid theropods by that of Megalosaurus and Torvosaurus, with robust upper corners. The humerus had a boss (bone overgrowth) above the condyle that contacted its hook-shaped radius (forearm bone). Accordingly, the ulna of the lower arm was well-developed with an enormous olecranon (upper process set-off from the shaft), an exceptional trait shared with Baryonyx. The heavy arm musculature powered sizable hand claws, that of the first digit (or "thumb") being the largest with a length of 19 centimetres (7.5 inches). Only the third metacarpal (long bone of the hand) is known, showing a robust morphology (form). In the pelvis, the ilium (main hip bone) was high. The pubis (pubic bone) had a front surface that was wider than the side surface, and its forward-facing lower end was flattened and rectangular, with a brief flange along the midline, in contrast to the expanded boot shape it had in other theropods. The ischium (lower and rearmost hip bone) bore a low obturator flange. The femur (thighbone) was straight and robust, with a length of 107 cm (42 in) in the holotype. Its lesser trochanter is markedly plate-like. In the ankle, the astragalus had an ascending process taller than that of Allosaurus.

== Classification ==
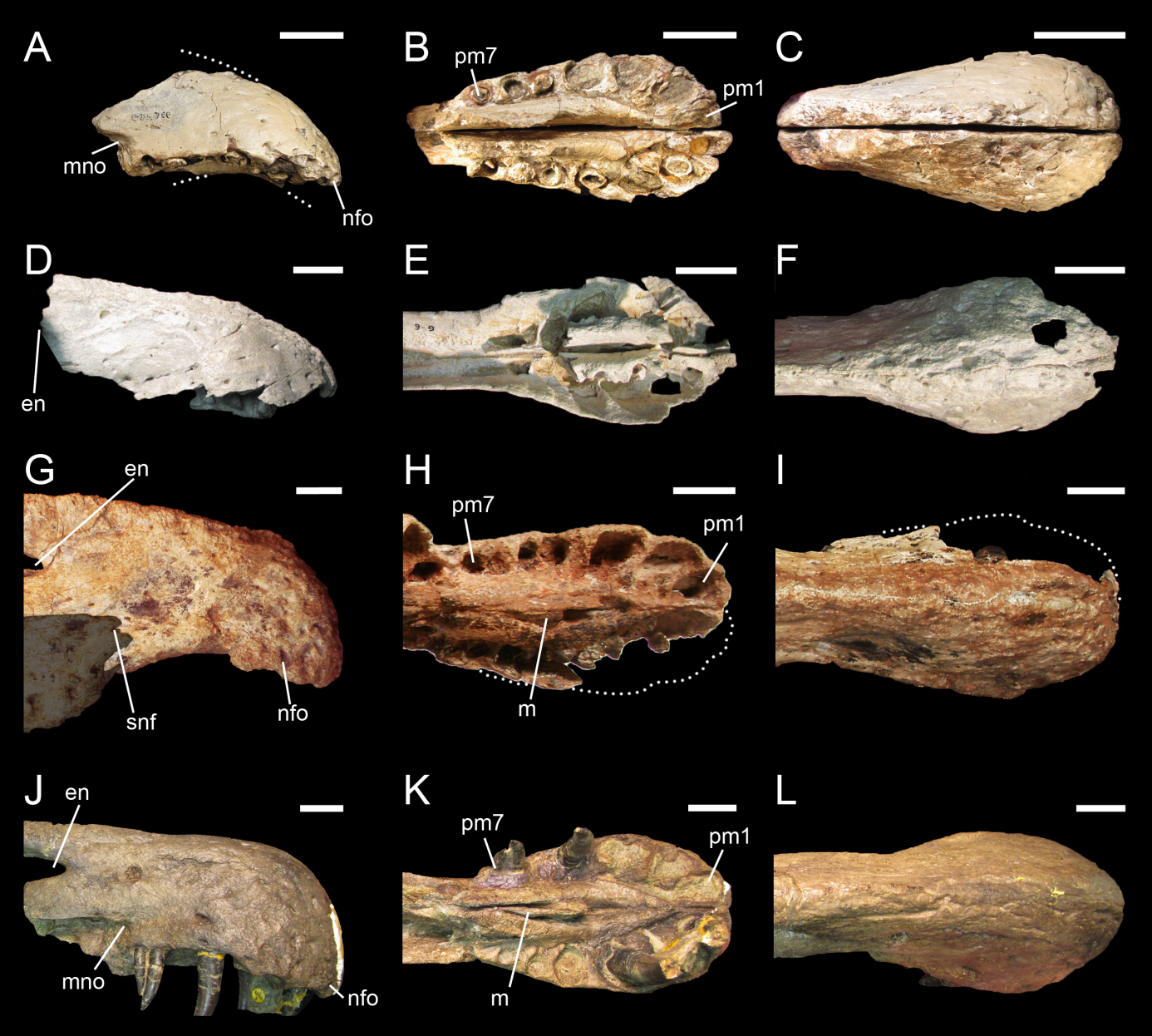
Snouts of Cristatusaurus (A–C), Suchomimus (D–I), and Baryonyx (J–L)

In their original 1998 description of Suchomimus, Sereno and colleagues identified several autapomorphies (unique derived traits) distinguishing it from other theropods: its expanded rear dorsal, sacral, and front caudal neural spines, the robust upper corners of the humerus, and the boss above the humerus' condyle that contacted its hook-shaped radius. The authors placed Suchomimus within Spinosauridae and named two subfamilies within this clade, Baryonychinae (all spinosaurids more closely related to Baryonyx) and Spinosaurinae (all spinosaurids closer to Spinosaurus), with Suchomimus assigned to the former. Apart from its apparently taller sail, Suchomimus was very similar to the spinosaurid Baryonyx from the Barremian of England, and shared traits with it such as the reduced size and increased amount of teeth behind the snout tip in the mandible than spinosaurines, strong forelimbs, a huge sickle-curved claw on its "thumb", and strongly keeled front dorsal vertebrae. Spinosaurines are characterized by straight, unserrated, and more widely spaced teeth and the small size of their first premaxillary teeth. Sereno and colleagues pointed out that the more retracted nostrils in Irritator and the tall sail of Spinosaurus could also be unique traits of spinosaurines, though material from other taxa is needed to know for sure. They also united the spinosaurids and their closest relatives in the superfamily Spinosauroidea, but in 2010, the British palaeontologist Roger Benson considered this a junior synonym of Megalosauroidea (an older name).

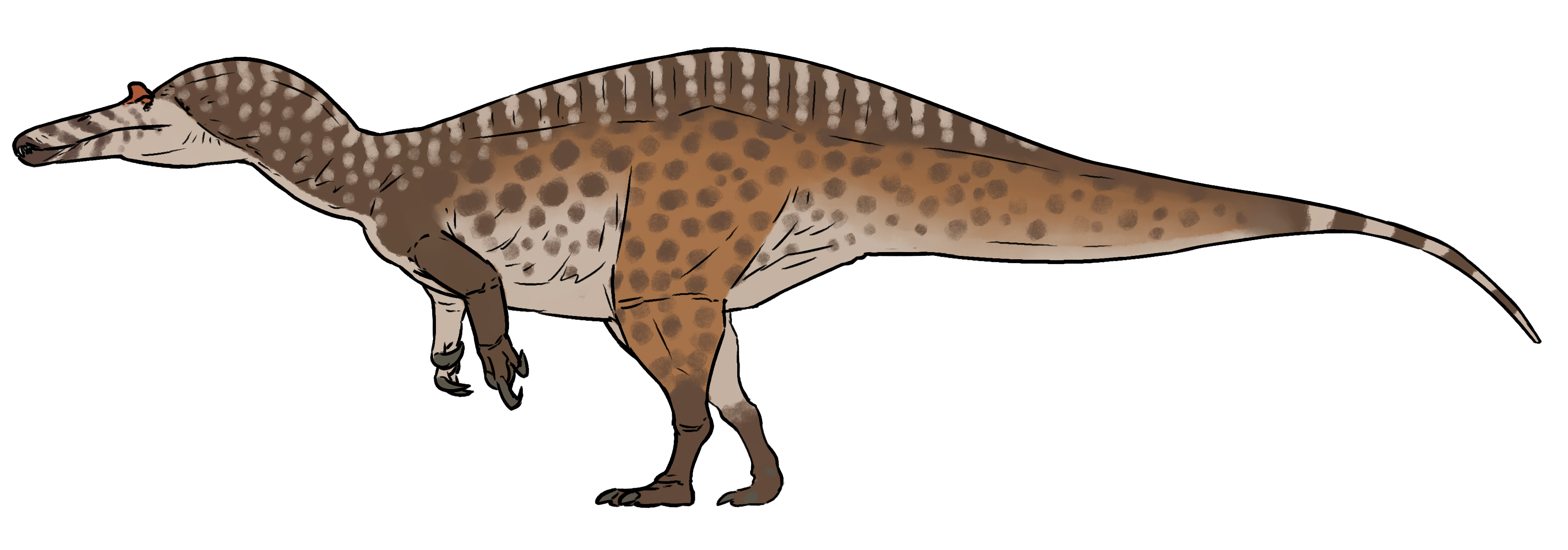
Life restoration

In their original 1998 paper, Sereno and colleagues analyzed the distribution of forty-five traits to produce a cladogram that showed Suchomimus and Baryonyx to be distinct but closely related genera. Based on the classification previously proposed between 1986 and 1997 by Charig and Milner, German paleontologist Oliver Rauhut reinstated the family Baryonychidae in 2003, noting the fragmentary and now-destroyed nature of the Spinosaurus holotype, while including this taxon within the group alongside Baryonyx, Suchomimus, Irritator, and its possible junior synonym, Angaturama. The following year, however, American palaeontologist Thomas R. Holtz Jr. and his colleagues regarded Baryonychidae as a synonym of Spinosauridae and reassigned these genera to the latter family, a classification that was subsequently supported by most later revisions. In 2017, Brazilian paleontologists Marcos Sales and Cesar Schultz have questioned the monophyly of Baryonychinae (meaning it might be an unnatural group), stating that the South American spinosaurids Angaturama and Irritator represent intermediate forms between Baryonychinae and Spinosaurinae, based on their craniodental (skull and tooth) features. Although not ruling out this possibility, American paleontologist Chris T. Barker and his colleagues established in 2021 a new tribe within the Baryonychinae, named Ceratosuchopsini, a clade that includes Ceratosuchops, Riparovenator, and Suchomimus. Their cladogram can be seen below.

- Megalosauridae
- Spinosauridae
  - Vallibonavenatrix
  - - Baryonychinae
      - - ML1190 (cf. Baryonyx sp.)
        - Baryonyx
      - Ceratosuchopsini
        - Suchomimus
        - - Riparovenator
          - Ceratosuchops
    - Spinosaurinae
      - Camarillasaurus
      - - Ichthyovenator
        - - Irritator
          - Spinosaurini
            - Sigilmassasaurus
            - - "Spinosaurus B"
              - - MSNM-V4047
                - - FSAC-KK11888
                  - Spinosaurus holotype

=== Evolution ===
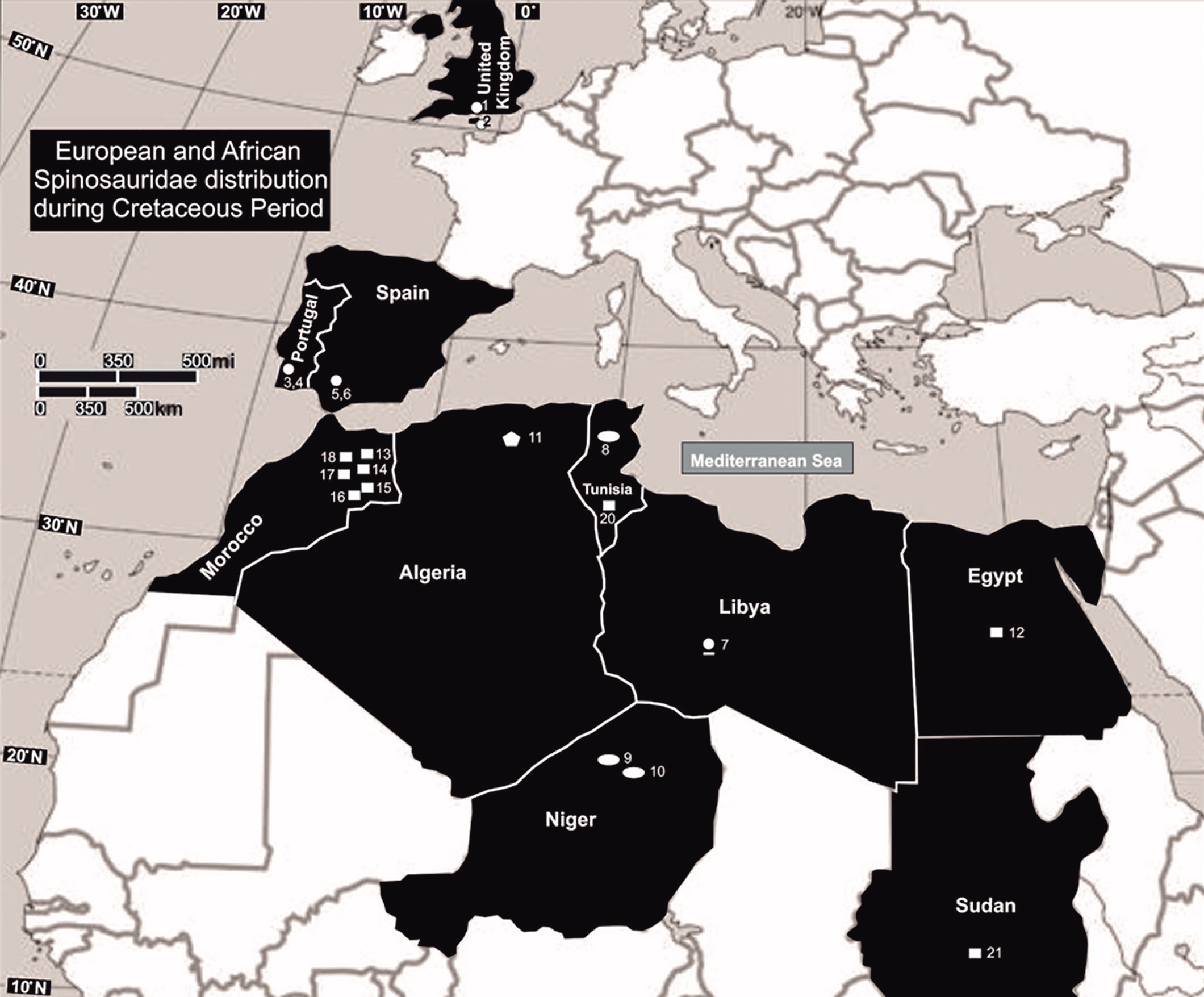
Distribution of spinosaurids in Europe and North Africa during the Cretaceous; 9 is Suchomimus

Spinosaurids appear to have been widespread from the Barremian to the Cenomanian stages of the Cretaceous period, about 130 to 95 million years ago, while the oldest known spinosaurid remains date to the Middle Jurassic. They shared features such as long, narrow, crocodile-like skulls; sub-circular teeth, with fine to no serrations; the terminal rosette of the snout; and a secondary palate that made them more resistant to torsion. In contrast, the primitive and typical condition for theropods was a tall, narrow snout with blade-like (ziphodont) teeth with serrated carinae. The skull adaptations of spinosaurids converged with those of crocodilians; early members of the latter group had skulls similar to typical theropods, later developing elongated snouts, conical teeth, and secondary palates. These adaptations may have been the result of a dietary change from terrestrial prey to fish. Unlike crocodiles, the post-cranial skeletons of baryonychine spinosaurids do not appear to have aquatic adaptations. Sereno and colleagues proposed in 1998 that the large thumb-claw and robust forelimbs of spinosaurids evolved in the Middle Jurassic, before the elongation of the skull and other adaptations related to fish-eating, since the former features are shared with their megalosaurid relatives. They also suggested that the spinosaurines and baryonychines diverged before the Barremian age of the Early Cretaceous.

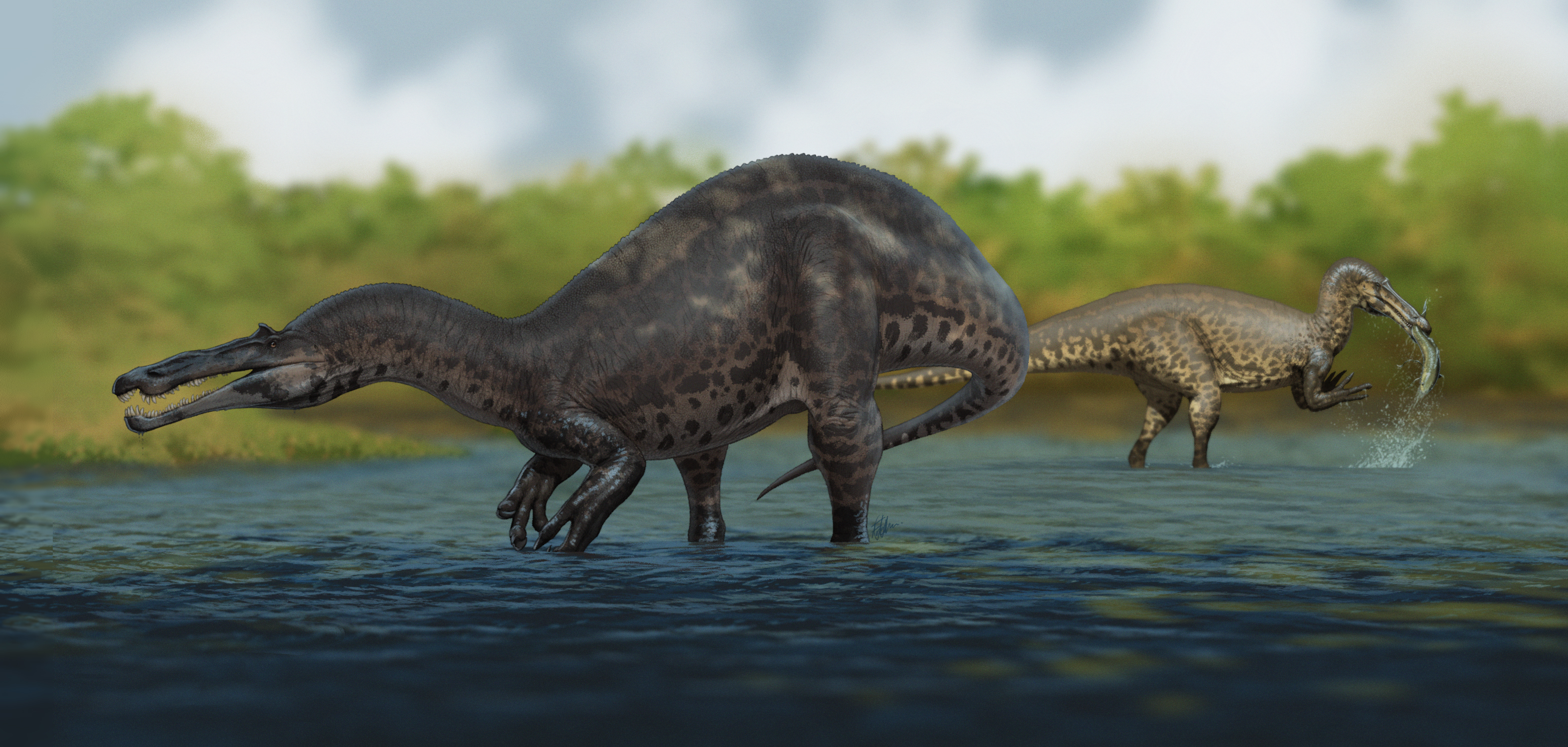
Life restoration of a pair of Suchomimus fishing in shallow water

Several hypotheses have been proposed about the biogeography of the spinosaurids. Since Suchomimus was more closely related to Baryonyx (from Europe) than to Spinosaurus—although that genus also lived in Africa—the distribution of spinosaurids cannot be explained as vicariance resulting from continental rifting. Sereno and colleagues proposed that spinosaurids were initially distributed across the supercontinent Pangea but split with the opening of the Tethys Sea. Spinosaurines would then have evolved in the south (Africa and South America: in Gondwana) and baryonychines in the north (Europe: in Laurasia), with Suchomimus the result of a single north-to-south dispersal event. In 2002, Buffetaut and Ouaja also suggested that baryonychines could be the ancestors of spinosaurines, which appear to have replaced the former in Africa. Milner suggested in 2003 that spinosaurids originated in Laurasia during the Jurassic and dispersed via the Iberian land bridge into Gondwana, where they radiated. In 2007, Buffetaut pointed out that palaeogeographical studies had demonstrated that Iberia was near northern Africa during the Early Cretaceous, which he found to confirm Milner's idea that the Iberian region was a stepping stone between Europe and Africa, which is supported by the presence of baryonychines in Iberia. The direction of the dispersal between Europe and Africa is still unknown, and subsequent discoveries of spinosaurid remains in Asia and possibly Australia indicate that it may have been complex.

Candeiro and colleagues suggested in 2017 that spinosaurids of northern Gondwana were replaced by other predators, such as abelisauroids, since no definite spinosaurid fossils are known from after the Cenomanian anywhere in the world. They attributed the disappearance of spinosaurids and other shifts in the fauna of Gondwana to changes in the environment, perhaps caused by transgressions in sea level. Barker and colleagues found support for a European origin for spinosaurids in 2021, with an expansion to Asia and Gondwana during the first half of the Early Cretaceous. In contrast to Sereno, these authors suggested there had been at least two dispersal events from Europe to Africa, leading to Suchomimus and the African part of Spinosaurinae.

== Palaeobiology ==
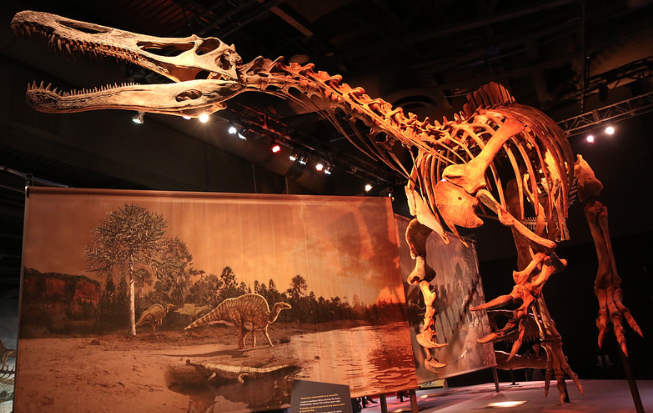
Mounted skeletal reconstruction at the Denver Museum of Nature and Science

Charig and Milner had proposed a piscivorous (fish-eating) diet for the closely related Baryonyx in 1986. This was later confirmed in 1997 with the discovery of partially digested fish scales found in the Baryonyx holotype. In 1998, Sereno and colleagues suggested the same dietary preference for Suchomimus, based on its elongated jaws, spoon-shaped terminal rosette, and long teeth reminiscent of those of piscivorous crocodilians. Holtz Jr. noted that spinosaurid teeth were adapted for grasping rather than slicing, hence their reduced serrations, which in most other theropods were more prominent. Suchomimus's extensive secondary palate, which would have made the roof of the mouth more solid, allowed it to better resist twisting forces exerted by prey. The rest of Suchomimus's body was not particularly adapted to the water. The discovery of Suchomimus revealed that spinosaurid skulls were significantly shallower, more elongated, and narrower than previously thought.

The use of the robust forelimbs and giant claws of spinosaurs remains a debated topic. Charig and Milner speculated in 1986 that Baryonyx may have crouched by the riverbank and used its claws to gaff fish out of the water, similarly to Grizzly bears. In 1987, British biologist Andrew Kitchener hypothesized a use in scavenging carcasses, though this has been critiqued by other researchers who pointed out that in most cases, a carcass would have already been largely emptied out by its initial predators. A 2005 study by Therrien and colleagues posited that spinosaur forelimbs were probably used for hunting larger prey items, given that their snouts could not resist the bending stress. In a 2017 review of the family, American paleontologist David Hone and Holtz Jr. also considered possible functions in digging for water sources or hard-to-reach prey, as well as burrowing into soil to construct nests. A 2022 study comparing the bone densities of Suchomimus, Baryonyx, and Spinosaurus reveals that spinosaurids had ecologically disparate lifestyles. Suchomimus itself was more adapted to a life hunting in shallow water due to its hollow bones, while Baryonyx and Spinosaurus were capable of fully submerging underwater and diving after prey. Courtesy of denser bones, the latter two spinosaurids could hunt underwater for prey and occupy a more derived lifestyle than Suchomimus could. Isotopic geochemical lines of evidence also support a semi-aquatic foraging habit for Suchomimus; its δ^{44/42}Ca values are highly negative, in contrast to contemporary abelisaurids and carcharodontosaurids, indicating a greater reliance on aquatic resources.

== Palaeoecology ==
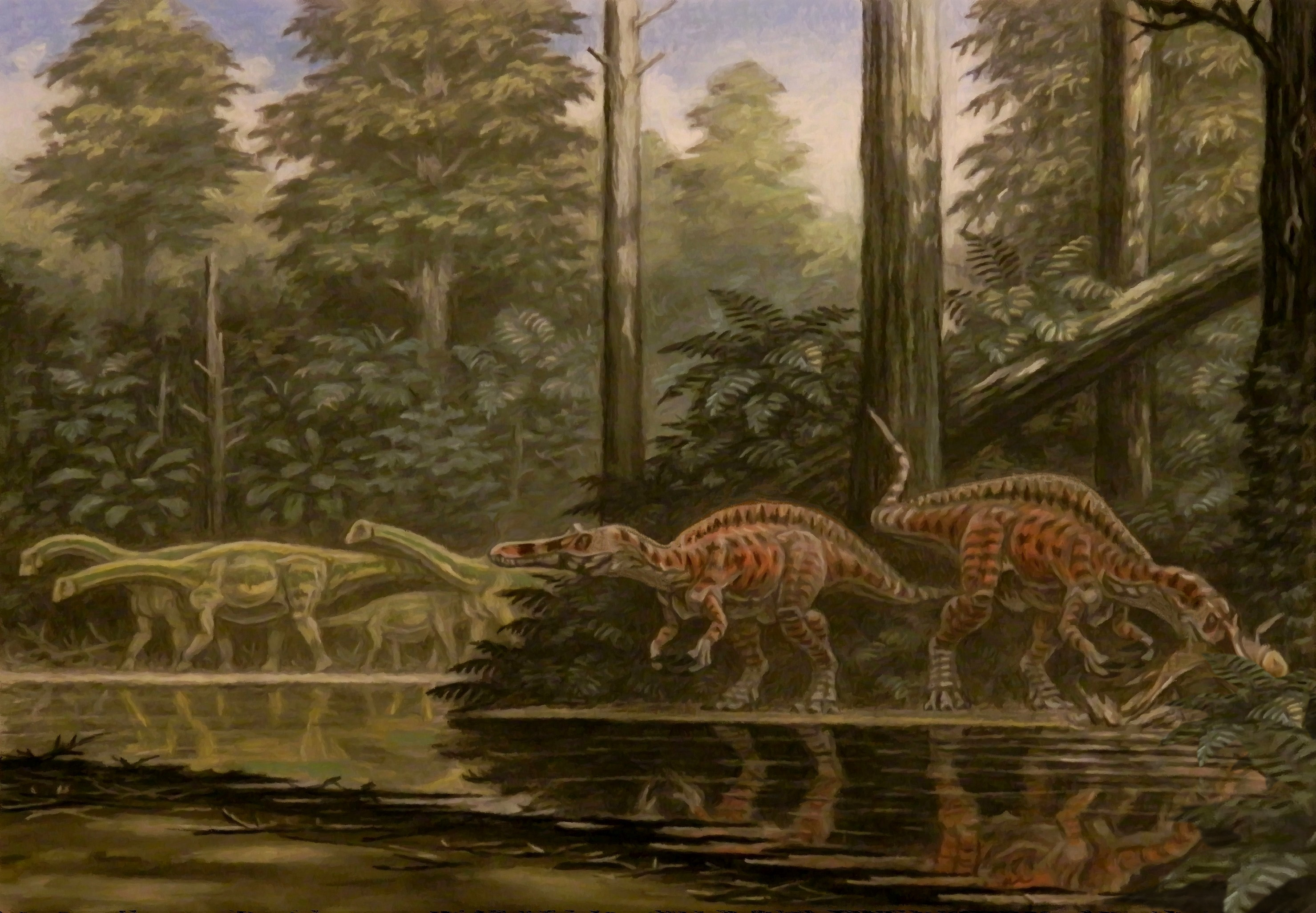
Restoration of Suchomimus and the sauropods Nigersaurus in the environment of the Elrhaz Formation

The Elrhaz Formation, part of the Tegama Group, consists mainly of fluvial sandstones with low relief, much of which is obscured by sand dunes. The sediments are coarse- to medium-grained, with almost no fine-grained horizons. Suchomimus lived in what is now Niger, during the late Aptian to early Albian stages of the Early Cretaceous, 112 million years ago. The sediment layers of the formation have been interpreted as an inland habitat of extensive freshwater floodplains and fast-moving rivers, with a tropical climate that likely experienced seasonal dry periods.

This environment was home to a variety of fauna, including dinosaurs, pterosaurs, turtles, fish, hybodont sharks, and freshwater bivalves. Besides Cristatusaurus, Suchomimus coexisted with other theropods like the abelisaurid Kryptops palaios, the carcharodontosaurid Eocarcharia dinops (likely a chimaera including spinosaurid bones), and an undescribed noasaurid. Herbivorous dinosaurs of the region included iguanodontians like Ouranosaurus nigeriensis, Elrhazosaurus nigeriensis, Lurdusaurus arenatus, and two sauropods: Nigersaurus taqueti and an unnamed titanosaur. Crocodylomorphs were abundant, represented by the giant pholidosaur species Sarcosuchus imperator, as well as small notosuchians like Anatosuchus minor, Araripesuchus wegeneri, and Stolokrosuchus lapparenti. The local flora probably consisted mainly of ferns, horsetails, and angiosperms, based on the dietary adaptations of the large diplodocoids that lived there.
