= Oliver Walter Mischa Rauhut =

German paleontologist (born 1969)

Oliver Rauhut
- Born: Oliver Walter Mischa Rauhut; 28 January 1969 (age 57); Aachen, Germany
- Education: Free University of Berlin; University of Bristol
- Known for: Research on Dinosaur evolution; descriptions of new dinosaurs and Jurassic mammals
- Scientific career
- Fields: Paleontology; Vertebrate paleontology
- Workplaces: Bayerische Staatssammlung für Paläontologie und Geologie; LMU Munich

Oliver Walter Mischa Rauhut (born 28 January 1969) is a German vertebrate paleontologist.

== Biography ==
Rauhut grew up in Aachen, Germany. He completed a degree in Geology/Paleontology at the Free University of Berlin in 1995, earning a Diplom. From 1996 to 1999, he conducted his Ph.D. research at the University of Bristol under David Unwin and was awarded his Ph.D. in May 2000. Since 2004, Rauhut has worked as a curator of lower vertebrates at the Bayerische Staatssammlung für Paläontologie und Geologie in Munich. Since 2007, he has also been a Privatdozent at LMU Munich.

His research focuses on Mesozoic terrestrial vertebrate fauna, especially dinosaur evolution. Rauhut has described, sometimes as a co-author, several dinosaurs including the theropods Aviatyrannis, Condorraptor, Sciurumimus, Wiehenvenator, Suchomimus, Xinjiangovenator and the sauropod Brachytrachelopan, as well as the early bird Alcmonavis. He also described Asfaltomylos, the first Jurassic mammal fossil found in South America.

Rauhut is married and has two children.

== Awards ==
- 2004: Albert Maucher Prize for Geosciences from the Deutsche Forschungsgemeinschaft (DFG).
