= List of fossiliferous stratigraphic units in Spain =

Group or Formation	Period	Notes
Abadia Group/Arauz Formation	Devonian	
Abadia Group/Cortés Formation	Devonian	
Abadia Group/Polentinos Formation	Devonian	
Ablanedo Formation	Carboniferous	
Aguion Formation	Devonian	
Alaro Calcarenite Formation	Paleogene	
Alba Formation	Carboniferous	
Alcalá Formation	Neogene	
Alcolea Formation	Devonian, Silurian	
Alconera Formation	Cambrian	
Alcorisa Formation	Paleogene	
Alcudian Formation	Cambrian	
Alfambra Formation	Neogene	
Alhambra Formation	Neogene	
Almonacid de la Cuba Formation	Jurassic	
Altamira Formation	Cretaceous	
Alternancia de margas y calizas de Turmiel Formation	Jurassic	
Alternating slates, greywackes, and volcanites Formation	Ordovician	
Anseroles Formation	Cretaceous	
Arcillas de Gibraleón Formation	Neogene	
Arcillas de Morella Formation	Cretaceous	
Ardanatz Sandstone	Paleogene	
Arenas de Huelva Formation	Neogene	
Areniscas de Cabrerizos Formation	Paleogene	
Areny Sandstone	Cretaceous	
Arguis Formation	Paleogene	
Armorican Quartzite	Ordovician	
Arroyo del Acebron Shale	Ordovician	
Artoles Formation	Cretaceous	
Arén Formation	Cretaceous	
Bachende Formation	Carboniferous	
Badenas Formation	Silurian	
Balco del Cucut Formation	Cretaceous	
Bancs mixtes Formation	Ordovician	
Bandera Formation	Devonian	
Barahona Formation	Jurassic	
Bastida Formation	Cretaceous	
Baza Formation	Neogene	
Bellmunt Formation	Paleogene	
Belsué Formation	Paleogene	
Benassal Formation	Cretaceous	
Blesa Formation	Cretaceous	
Bolloncillos Formation	Devonian	
Borrachón Formation	Ordovician	
Brèches rouges de Carboneras Formation	Neogene	
Buntsandstein Group/Areniscas y Lutitas del Figaro Formation	Triassic	
Bádenas Formation	Silurian	
Cabaços Formation	Jurassic	
Cabezo Agudo Formation	Devonian	
Cabo Cope Formation	Triassic	
Cabo de Lata Formation	Paleogene, Cretaceous	
Cabuérniga Group/Arcera Formation	Cretaceous	
Cal Triunfo Formation	Cretaceous	
Calcaires à oncolithes Formation	Jurassic	
Calcarenites of Sant Elm Formation	Neogene	
Calcaries de Tàrrega Formation	Paleogene	
Calcàries Tàrrega Formation	Paleogene	
Caliza de Peguera Formation	Paleogene	
Calizas de la Heurguina Formation	Cretaceous	
Calizas de Lychnus Formation	Cretaceous	
Calizas de Oliete Formation	Cretaceous	
Calvari Marl Formation	Paleogene	
Calymenella Quartzite Formation	Ordovician	
Camarena Formation	Jurassic	
Camarillas Formation	Cretaceous	
Candas Formation	Devonian	
Candás Formation	Devonian	
Cantera Shale Formation	Ordovician	
Capas Rojas Formation	Cretaceous	
Carregador de Carreu Formation	Cretaceous	
Carrion Group/Cardano Formation	Devonian	
Carrion Group/Gustalapiedra Formation	Devonian	
El Castellar Formation	Cretaceous	
Castillejo Formation	Ordovician	
Castrillo de la Reina Formation	Cretaceous	
Cerro del Pez Formation	Jurassic	
Chaume Formation	Cretaceous	
Coll de Jovell Formation	Cretaceous	
Collades de Basturs Formation	Cretaceous	
Collbás Formation	Paleogene	
Comabella Formation	Devonian	
Complejo Basal Transgresivo Formation	Neogene	
Congost Formation	Cretaceous	
Cremenes Formation	Devonian	
Cuber Formation	Jurassic	
Cuera Limestone	Carboniferous	
Cuevas Formation	Neogene	
Cystoid Formation	Ordovician	
Cystoid (Ashgill) Limestone Formation	Ordovician	
Cystoid Limestone	Ordovician	
Córcoles Formation	Neogene	
d'Enevrio Formation	Ordovician	
Demues Formation	Carboniferous	
Dere Formation	Ordovician	
Detritic Group/Calcena Lutites and Sandstones Formation	Triassic	
Dolomites & Limestones of Cañete Formation	Triassic	
Dolomites and Limestones of Cañete (CDL) Formation	Triassic	
Dolomías tableadas de Imón Formation	Triassic	
Ecija Formation	Neogene	
Eguino Formation	Cretaceous	
El Bosque Formation	Paleogene	
Castellar Formation	Devonian	
El Castro Formation	Silurian, Ordovician	
El Collado Formation	Cretaceous	
El Zadorra Formation	Cretaceous	
Enciso Group/Leza Formation	Cretaceous	
Entrala Formation	Paleogene	
Ermita Formation	Devonian	
Escucha Formation	Cretaceous	
Esla Formation	Devonian	
Eslida Formation	Triassic	
Esperanza Formation	Carboniferous	
Espiritu Santo Formation	Neogene	
Fombuena Formation	Ordovician	
Font Bordonera Formation	Cretaceous	
Forcall Formation	Cretaceous	
G. teretiusculus Group/Neseuretus tristani Shale and Los Rasos Sandstone Formation	Ordovician	
Garumn facies Formation	Cretaceous	
Gibraltar Limestone	Jurassic	
Gijon Formation	Jurassic, Triassic	
Golmayo Formation	Cretaceous	
Green and Nodular Shales Formation	Ordovician	
Guadix Formation	Spain	
Guindo Shale	Ordovician	
Herba Formation	Cretaceous	
Higueruelas Formation	Jurassic	
Hornos Formation	Triassic	
Hortezuelos Formation	Cretaceous	
Huesa Formation	Devonian	
Huérteles Formation	Cretaceous	
Igualada Formation	Paleogene	
Ilundain Marls Formation	Paleogene	
Jarropa Radiolarite Formation	Jurassic	
Jijona Formation	Cretaceous	
La Bastida Shales Formation	Ordovician	
La Cabana Formation	Cretaceous	
La Hoya Formation	Devonian	
La Huérguina Formation	Cretaceous	
La Mora Slate	Ordovician	
La Pedrera de Rúbies Formation	Cretaceous	
La Tossa Formation	Paleogene	
La Venta Formation	Ordovician	
La Vid Formation	Devonian	
La Vid Group/Coladilla Formation	Devonian	
La Vid Group/La Pedrosa Formation	Devonian	
La Vid Group/Tramo inferior Formation	Devonian	
La Vid Group/Valporquero Formation	Devonian	
Lancara Formation	Cambrian	
Las Llacerias Formation	Carboniferous	
Las Penosas Formation	Cretaceous	
Lastres Formation	Jurassic	
Lebanza Formation	Devonian	
Lignites de Traiguera Formation	Cretaceous	
Llacova Formation	Cretaceous	
Lorente Formation	Jurassic	
Lores Limestone	Carboniferous	
Los Navalucillos Limestone	Cambrian	
Los Villares Formation	Cretaceous, Cambrian	
Lower Bone Bed Formation	Neogene	
Lower Kellwasser Limestone	Devonian	
Luesma Formation	Devonian, Silurian	
Lychnus Formation	Cretaceous	
Láncara Formation	Cambrian	
Marbella Formation	Carboniferous	
Margas de Pamplona Formation	Paleogene	
Margas y Calizas Margosas de Nidaguila Formation	Cretaceous	
Mariposas Formation	Devonian	
Mazaterón Formation	Paleogene	
Mesones Group/Murero Formation	Cambrian	
Mesones Group/Valdemiedes Formation	Cambrian	
Middle Muschelkalk Formation	Triassic	
Milanos Formation	Jurassic	
Miono Formation	Cretaceous	
Mirambel Formation	Cretaceous	
Miravetes Formation	Cretaceous	
Molino Formation	Devonian	
Monforte Formation	Devonian	
Moniello Formation	Devonian	
MonielloFormation	Devonian	
Montagut Formation	Cretaceous	
Montesquiu Formation	Cretaceous	
Moutonianum Formation	Cretaceous	
Moyuela Formation	Devonian	
Murero Formation	Cambrian	
Murillo Formation	Paleogene	
Muschelkalk Formation	Triassic	
Najerilla Formation	Cambrian	
Navas de Estena Formation	Ordovician	
Navas de Estena Shale Formation	Ordovician	
Navas de Estena Shale (Neseuretus tristani) Formation	Ordovician	
Navatrasierra Shale Formation	Ordovician	
Neseuretus tristani Shale Formation	Ordovician	
Neseuretus tristani Shale and Los Rasos Sandstone Formation	Ordovician	
Nieva Formation	Devonian	
Nocedo Formation	Devonian	
Nogueras Formation	Devonian	
Novaglie Formation	Neogene	
Olazagutia Formation	Cretaceous	
Olloniego Formation	Carboniferous	
Oncala Group/Huérteles Formation	Cretaceous	
Onnia shales Formation	Ordovician	
Ossa Formation	Cambrian	
Oville Formation	Cambrian	
Pamplona Formation	Paleogene	
Pedroche Formation	Cambrian	
Pedroso Group/Hortigüela Formation	Cretaceous	
Pedroso Group/Piedrahita de Muñó Formation	Cretaceous	
Pelmatazoan Limestone	Ordovician	
Pena Negra Formation	Devonian	
Perna Formation	Carboniferous	
Picos de Europa Formation	Carboniferous	
Pineda Group/Carazo Formation	Devonian	
Pineda Group/Lebanz Formation	Devonian	
Pinilla de los Moros Formation	Cretaceous	
Pizarras Carretera Formation	Ordovician	
Pizarras del Río Formation	Ordovician	
Podega Formation	Cretaceous	
Portilla Formation	Devonian	
Puebla Formation	Paleogene	
Puentelles Formation	Carboniferous	
Puerto de Mazarrón Formation	Neogene	
Puerto de Olazagutia Formation	Cretaceous	
Pusa Shale	Ediacaran	
Quartzites Botella Formation	Ordovician	
Quintanaloma Formation	Cretaceous	
Ramblar Formation	Devonian	
Raneces Group/Caliza de Ferrones Formation	Devonian	
Raneces Group/Caliza de Nieva Formation	Devonian	
Raneces Group/Capas de Aguion Formation	Devonian	
Raneces Group/Capas de Ferrones Formation	Devonian	
Raneces Group/Ferrones Formation	Devonian	
Raspay Formation	Cretaceous	
Ribadesella Group/Vega Formation	Jurassic	
Rio Huso Group/Middle Formation	Cambrian	
Rio Palomar Formation	Jurassic	
Río Shale	Ordovician	
Roda Formation	Paleogene	
Rodanas Formation	Devonian	
Rodiles Formation	Jurassic	
Roja Inferior Formation	Permian	
Rojales Sandstone Formation	Neogene	
S'Envestida Calcarenite Formation	Paleogene	
Salobral Formation	Devonian	
Sama Formation	Carboniferous	
San Emiliano Formation	Carboniferous	
San Tirso Formation	Carboniferous	
Sandy limestone and dark shale Formation	Ordovician	
Sant Corneli Formation	Cretaceous	
Sant Elm Formation	Neogene	
Santa Cruz Formation	Devonian	
Santa Lucía Formation	Devonian	
Santed Formation	Ordovician	
Santibañez del Val Formation	Cretaceous	
Schistes Botella Formation	Ordovician	
Senyús Formation	Cretaceous	
Sierra del Castillo Formation	Carboniferous	
Sierra Perenchiza Formation	Cretaceous	
Siphonodendron Limestone Formation	Carboniferous	
Sobrare Formation	Paleogene	
Son Sastre Sandstones and Lutites Formation	Paleogene	
Son Serralta Formation	Triassic	
Sot de Chera Formation	Jurassic	
Suertes Group/Las Arroyacas Formation	Silurian	
Suertes Group/Robledo Formation	Silurian	
Sueve Shale Formation	Ordovician	
Tariquide Formation	Triassic	
Tera Group/Magaña Formation	Jurassic	
Tera Group/Piedrahita de Muñó Formation	Cretaceous	
Tera Group/Pinilla de los Moros Formation	Cretaceous	
Terenes Formation	Jurassic	
Tereñes Marl	Jurassic	
Texanitid Marl	Cretaceous	
Tierra de Lara Group/Rupelo Formation	Cretaceous	
Tollo Formation	Cretaceous	
Torrella Formation	Cretaceous	
Torreáboles Formation	Cambrian	
Tossa Formation	Paleogene	
Tremp Formation	Paleogene, Cretaceous	
Tremp Group/Conques Formation	Cretaceous	
Tremp Group/La Posa Formation	Cretaceous	
Tudela Formation	Neogene	
Turia Group/Chelva Formation	Jurassic	
Turia Group/Sot de Chera Formation	Jurassic	
Turmiel Formation	Jurassic	
Ullaga Formation	Cretaceous	
Upper Bedoulian Formation	Cretaceous	
Upper Muschelkalk Group/Dolomite Formation	Triassic	
Urbasa Formation	Paleogene	
Urbión Group/Larriba Formation	Cretaceous	
Urbión Group/Leza Formation	Cretaceous	
Urbión Group/Pinilla de los Moros Formation	Cretaceous	
Utrillas Formation	Cretaceous	
Valdeganga Formation	Neogene	
Valdemorillo Shale	Ordovician	
Valdeteja Formation	Carboniferous	
Vallcarga Formation	Cretaceous	
Valle Shale Formation	Ordovician	
Vega Formation	Jurassic	
Vega de Pas Formation	Cretaceous	
Vegamian Formation	Carboniferous	
Venta del Moro Formation	Neogene	
Vergaño Formation	Carboniferous	
Vic Marl	Paleogene	
Vila Vella Formation	Cretaceous	
Villalba de la Sierra Formation	Cretaceous	
Villanueva de Huerva Formation	Cretaceous	
Villar del Arzobispo Formation	Cretaceous, Jurassic	
Villaro Formation	Cretaceous	
Villarrosano Formation	Paleogene	
Villarroya de los Pinares Formation	Cretaceous	
Villaviciosa beds Formation	Permian	
Villaviciosa Group/Rodiles Formation	Jurassic	
Vitoria Formation	Cretaceous	
Xert Formation	Cretaceous	
Yatova Formation	Jurassic	
Zegrí Formation	Jurassic	
Ágreda Formation	Jurassic	

== Correlation of the Early Cretaceous ==
Early Cretaceous stratigraphy of Iberia
Ma	Age	Paleomap \ Basins	Cantabrian	Olanyà	Cameros	Maestrazgo	Oliete	Galve	Morella	South Iberian	Pre-betic	Lusitanian
100	Cenomanian		La Cabana	Sopeira	Utrillas		Mosquerela					Caranguejeira
100	Cenomanian		Altamira	Sopeira	Utrillas							Caranguejeira
100	Cenomanian		Eguino	Sopeira	Utrillas							Caranguejeira
125	Albian		Ullaga - Balmaseda	Lluçà	Utrillas					Traiguera		Caranguejeira
125	Albian		Monte Grande	Lluçà	Escucha		Escucha			Jijona		Caranguejeira
125	Albian		Itxina - Miono	Lluçà	Escucha		Escucha					Caranguejeira
125	Aptian		Valmaseda - Tellamendi	Lluçà	Ol Gp. - Castrillo	Benassal	Escucha	Benassal				Olhos
125	Aptian		Valmaseda - Tellamendi	Font	En Gp. - Leza	Morella/Oliete	Oliete	Villaroya	Morella	Capas; Rojas		Almargem
125	Aptian		Patrocinio - Ernaga	Senyús	En Gp. - Jubela	Forcall			Morella	Villaroya	Upper; Bedoulian	Figueira
125	Barremian		Vega de Pas	Cabó	Abejar	Xert	Alacón	Xert	Morella	Huérguina	Upper; Bedoulian	Assises
125	Barremian		Vega de Pas	Prada	Abejar	Artoles			Morella	Collado	Moutonianum	Papo Seco
125	Barremian		Vega de Pas	Rúbies	Tera Gp. - Golmayo	Alacón/Blesa	Blesa	Camarillas	Mirambel	Collado	Moutonianum	Papo Seco
150	Hauterivian		Vega de Pas	Rúbies	Ur Gp. - Pinilla	Llacova	Blesa	Castellar	Tera Gp. - Pinilla	Villares		Porto da Calada
150	Hauterivian		Vega de Pas	Rúbies	Ur Gp. - Pinilla	Llacova	hiatus	Castellar		Villares		Porto da Calada
150	Hauterivian		Vega de Pas	Rúbies	Ur Gp. - Pinilla	Huerva	hiatus	Castellar	Gaita			Porto da Calada
150	Valanginian		Villaro	Rúbies	Ur Gp. - Larriba	Huerva	hiatus	Castellar	Ped Gp. - Hortigüela			Porto da Calada
150	Valanginian		Villaro	Rúbies	Ped Gp. - Hortigüela	Huerva	hiatus	Castellar	Ped Gp. - Piedrahita			Porto da Calada
150	Valanginian		Villaro	Rúbies	Peñacoba	Huerva	hiatus	Galve	Ped Gp. - Piedrahita	Miravetes		Porto da Calada
150	Berriasian		Cab Gp. - Arcera	Rúbies	Valdeprado	hiatus	hiatus	Alfambra	Ped Gp. - Piedrahita	Miravetes		Porto da Calada
150	Berriasian		Cab Gp. - Arcera		TdL Gp. - Rupelo	hiatus	hiatus	Arzobispo	hiatus	Tollo		Porto da Calada
150	Berriasian		Cab Gp. - Arcera		On Gp. - Huérteles; Sierra Matute	hiatus	hiatus	Arzobispo	hiatus	Tollo		Porto da Calada
150	Tithonian		Lastres		Tera Gp. - Magaña	hiatus	Higuereles		hiatus	Tera Gp. - Magaña		Lourinhã
150	Tithonian		Lastres		Tera Gp. - Magaña	hiatus	Higuereles		Arzobispo	Tera Gp. - Magaña		Lourinhã
150	Tithonian		Lastres		Ágreda	hiatus	Higuereles		Arzobispo	Tera Gp. - Magaña		Lourinhã
Legend		Major fossiliferous, oofossiliferous, ichnofossiliferous, coproliferous, minor formation										

== See also ==
- Lists of fossiliferous stratigraphic units in Europe
