= Molino Formation =

Molino Formation may refer to:

- Molino Formation, Colombia, a Campanian to Maastrichtian geologic formation of the Cesar-Ranchería Basin in northeastern Colombia
- Molino Formation, Spain, a Devonian geologic formation in Spain
- El Molino Formation, a Maastrichtian geologic formation in Bolivia
