= Gibraltar Limestone =

Geologic formation in Gibraltar

- Stratigraphic range: Early Jurassic
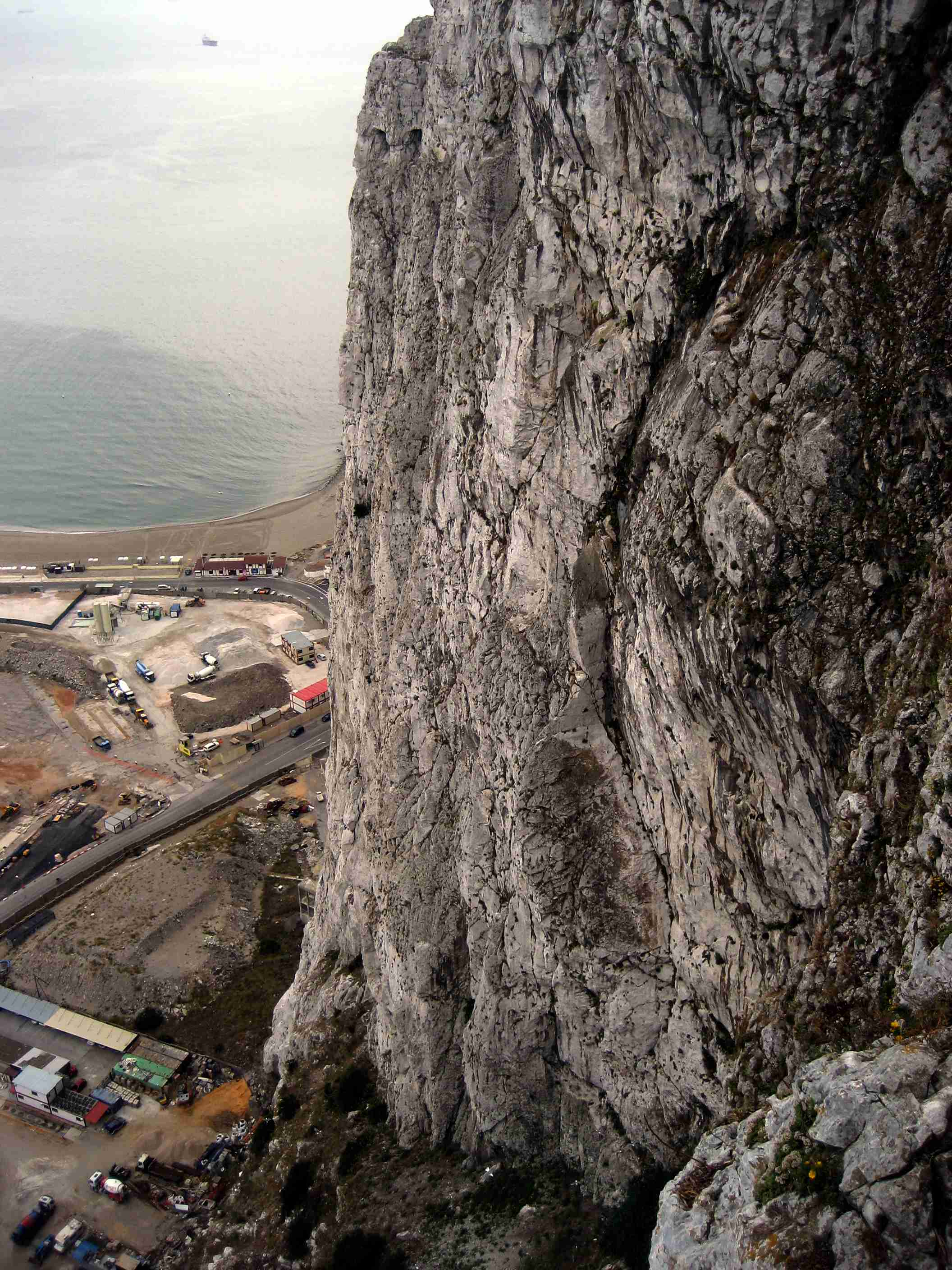
- North face of the Rock of Gibraltar
- Type: Formation

Location
- Country: Gibraltar

Gibraltar Limestone consists of greyish-white or pale-gray compact, and sometime finely crystalline, medium to thick bedded limestones and dolomites that locally contain chert seams. This formation comprises about three quarters of the Rock of Gibraltar near the southernmost tip of the Iberian Peninsula. Geologists have found various poorly preserved and badly eroded and rolled marine fossils within it. The fossils found in the Gibraltar Limestone include various brachiopods, corals, echinoid fragments, gastropods, pelecypods, and stromatolites. These fossils indicate an Early Jurassic age (Lower Lias) for the deposition of the Gibraltar Limestone.

== See also ==
- List of types of limestone
- List of fossiliferous stratigraphic units in Spain
