= Xert Formation =

Geologic formation in Spain

- Stratigraphic range: Late Barremian; ~122–120 Ma
- Type: Geological formation
- Underlies: Forcall Formation
- Overlies: Artoles Formation, Arcillas de Morella Formation

Lithology
- Primary: Limestone, marl
- Other: Claystone, chert

Location
- Coordinates: 40.7°N 0.1°E
- Approximate paleocoordinates: 30.1°N 10.2°E
- Region: Aragón
- Country: Spain
- Extent: Maestrazgo Basin; Galve Basin

Type section
- Named for: Chert
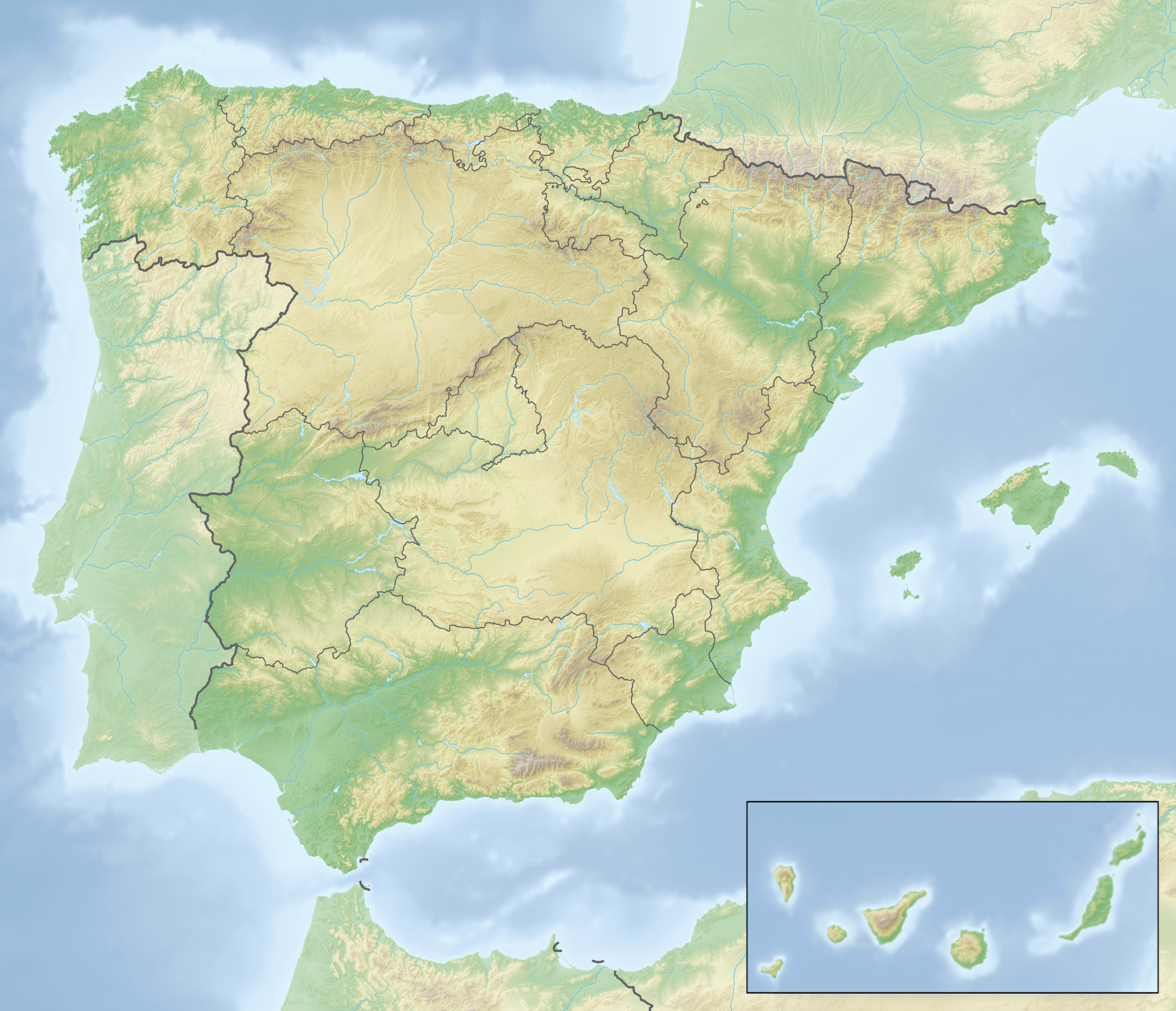
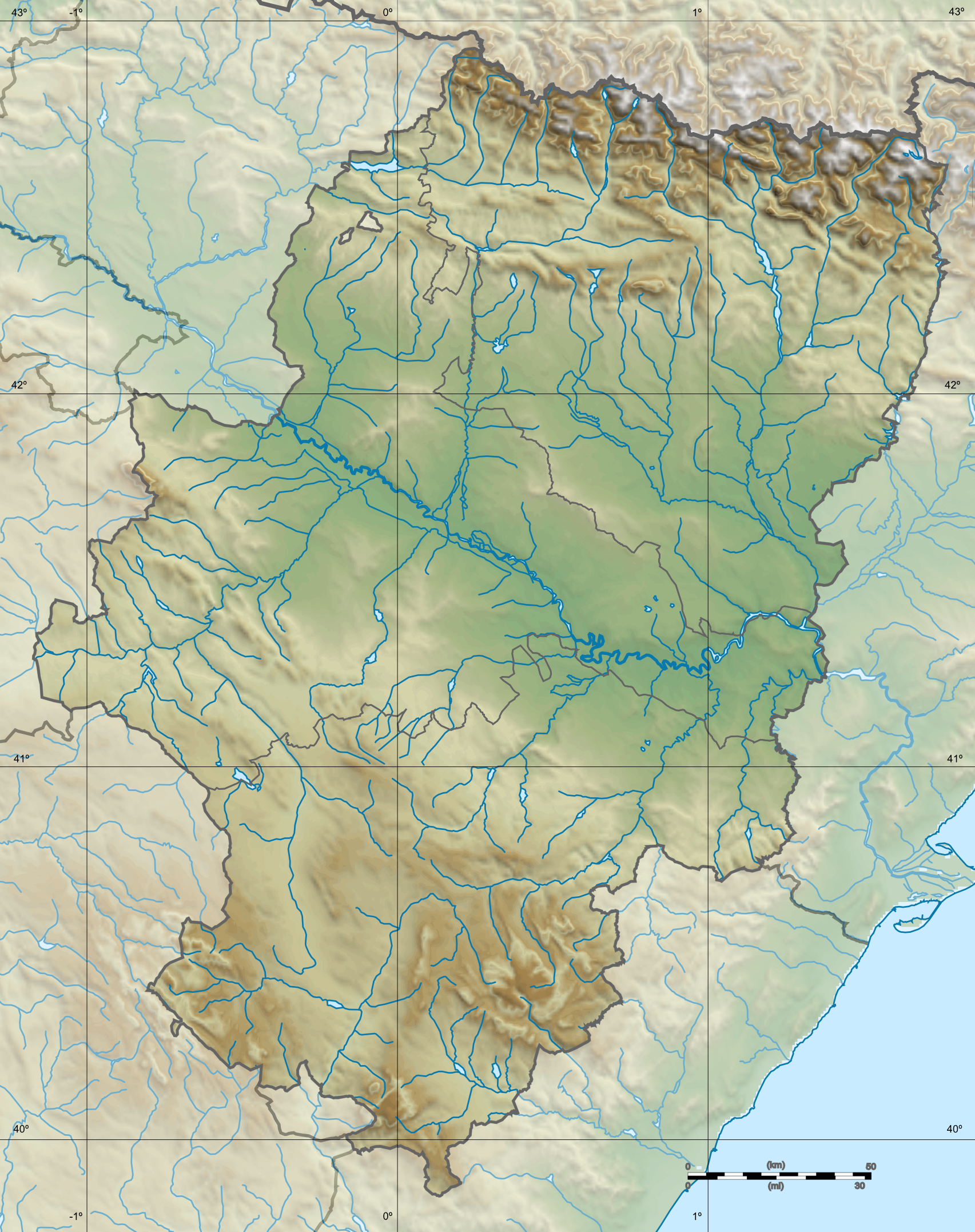
- Xert Formation (Spain) Xert Formation (Aragon)

The Calizas y margas de Xert Formation or Xert Formation is an Early Cretaceous (late Barremian) geologic formation of the Maestrazgo and Galve Basins in central-eastern Spain. The formation is described as a coastal claystone, with indications of a transgressive episode, marked by the transition from marsh facies, with little marine influence, to marine platform facies evidenced by abundant marine invertebrates.

== Fossil content ==
Dinosaurs

- Tastavinsaurus sanzi

Invertebrates

- Bivalvia indet.
- Gastropoda indet.

Flora

- Plantae indet.

== Correlation ==
Early Cretaceous stratigraphy of Iberia
Ma	Age	Paleomap \ Basins	Cantabrian	Olanyà	Cameros	Maestrazgo	Oliete	Galve	Morella	South Iberian	Pre-betic	Lusitanian
100	Cenomanian		La Cabana	Sopeira	Utrillas		Mosquerela					Caranguejeira
100	Cenomanian		Altamira	Sopeira	Utrillas							Caranguejeira
100	Cenomanian		Eguino	Sopeira	Utrillas							Caranguejeira
125	Albian		Ullaga - Balmaseda	Lluçà	Utrillas					Traiguera		Caranguejeira
125	Albian		Monte Grande	Lluçà	Escucha		Escucha			Jijona		Caranguejeira
125	Albian		Itxina - Miono	Lluçà	Escucha		Escucha					Caranguejeira
125	Aptian		Valmaseda - Tellamendi	Lluçà	Ol Gp. - Castrillo	Benassal	Escucha	Benassal				Olhos
125	Aptian		Valmaseda - Tellamendi	Font	En Gp. - Leza	Morella/Oliete	Oliete	Villaroya	Morella	Capas; Rojas		Almargem
125	Aptian		Patrocinio - Ernaga	Senyús	En Gp. - Jubela	Forcall			Morella	Villaroya	Upper; Bedoulian	Figueira
125	Barremian		Vega de Pas	Cabó	Abejar	Xert	Alacón	Xert	Morella	Huérguina	Upper; Bedoulian	Assises
125	Barremian		Vega de Pas	Prada	Abejar	Artoles			Morella	Collado	Moutonianum	Papo Seco
125	Barremian		Vega de Pas	Rúbies	Tera Gp. - Golmayo	Alacón/Blesa	Blesa	Camarillas	Mirambel	Collado	Moutonianum	Papo Seco
150	Hauterivian		Vega de Pas	Rúbies	Ur Gp. - Pinilla	Llacova	Blesa	Castellar	Tera Gp. - Pinilla	Villares		Porto da Calada
150	Hauterivian		Vega de Pas	Rúbies	Ur Gp. - Pinilla	Llacova	hiatus	Castellar		Villares		Porto da Calada
150	Hauterivian		Vega de Pas	Rúbies	Ur Gp. - Pinilla	Huerva	hiatus	Castellar	Gaita			Porto da Calada
150	Valanginian		Villaro	Rúbies	Ur Gp. - Larriba	Huerva	hiatus	Castellar	Ped Gp. - Hortigüela			Porto da Calada
150	Valanginian		Villaro	Rúbies	Ped Gp. - Hortigüela	Huerva	hiatus	Castellar	Ped Gp. - Piedrahita			Porto da Calada
150	Valanginian		Villaro	Rúbies	Peñacoba	Huerva	hiatus	Galve	Ped Gp. - Piedrahita	Miravetes		Porto da Calada
150	Berriasian		Cab Gp. - Arcera	Rúbies	Valdeprado	hiatus	hiatus	Alfambra	Ped Gp. - Piedrahita	Miravetes		Porto da Calada
150	Berriasian		Cab Gp. - Arcera		TdL Gp. - Rupelo	hiatus	hiatus	Arzobispo	hiatus	Tollo		Porto da Calada
150	Berriasian		Cab Gp. - Arcera		On Gp. - Huérteles; Sierra Matute	hiatus	hiatus	Arzobispo	hiatus	Tollo		Porto da Calada
150	Tithonian		Lastres		Tera Gp. - Magaña	hiatus	Higuereles		hiatus	Tera Gp. - Magaña		Lourinhã
150	Tithonian		Lastres		Tera Gp. - Magaña	hiatus	Higuereles		Arzobispo	Tera Gp. - Magaña		Lourinhã
150	Tithonian		Lastres		Ágreda	hiatus	Higuereles		Arzobispo	Tera Gp. - Magaña		Lourinhã
Legend		Major fossiliferous, oofossiliferous, ichnofossiliferous, coproliferous, minor formation										

== See also ==
- Mesozoic Spain
- List of dinosaur-bearing rock formations
  - List of stratigraphic units with few dinosaur genera
