= Caranguejeira Conglomerate =

Geologic formation in Portugal

- Stratigraphic range: Aptian-Cenomanian
- Type: Geological formation

Lithology
- Primary: Conglomerate

Location
- Coordinates: 39.7°N 8.6°W
- Approximate paleocoordinates: 29.6°N 1.9°W
- Region: Santarém
- Country: Portugal
- Extent: Lusitanian Basin
- Caranguejeira Conglomerate (Portugal)

The Caranguejeira Conglomerate (Portuguese: Conglomerados de Caranguejeira) is an Aptian to Cenomanian geologic formation in Portugal. Dinosaur remains diagnostic to the genus level are among the fossils that have been recovered from the formation.

== Paleofauna ==
- Duriatitan humerocristatus
- Lourinhasaurus alenquerensis
- Megalosaurus insignis (theropod indet.)
- Morosaurus marchei (theropod indet.)
- Pelorosaurus humerocristatus (sauropod indet.)

== Correlation ==
Early Cretaceous stratigraphy of Iberia
Ma	Age	Paleomap \ Basins	Cantabrian	Olanyà	Cameros	Maestrazgo	Oliete	Galve	Morella	South Iberian	Pre-betic	Lusitanian
100	Cenomanian		La Cabana	Sopeira	Utrillas		Mosquerela					Caranguejeira
100	Cenomanian		Altamira	Sopeira	Utrillas							Caranguejeira
100	Cenomanian		Eguino	Sopeira	Utrillas							Caranguejeira
125	Albian		Ullaga - Balmaseda	Lluçà	Utrillas					Traiguera		Caranguejeira
125	Albian		Monte Grande	Lluçà	Escucha		Escucha			Jijona		Caranguejeira
125	Albian		Itxina - Miono	Lluçà	Escucha		Escucha					Caranguejeira
125	Aptian		Valmaseda - Tellamendi	Lluçà	Ol Gp. - Castrillo	Benassal	Escucha	Benassal				Olhos
125	Aptian		Valmaseda - Tellamendi	Font	En Gp. - Leza	Morella/Oliete	Oliete	Villaroya	Morella	Capas; Rojas		Almargem
125	Aptian		Patrocinio - Ernaga	Senyús	En Gp. - Jubela	Forcall			Morella	Villaroya	Upper; Bedoulian	Figueira
125	Barremian		Vega de Pas	Cabó	Abejar	Xert	Alacón	Xert	Morella	Huérguina	Upper; Bedoulian	Assises
125	Barremian		Vega de Pas	Prada	Abejar	Artoles			Morella	Collado	Moutonianum	Papo Seco
125	Barremian		Vega de Pas	Rúbies	Tera Gp. - Golmayo	Alacón/Blesa	Blesa	Camarillas	Mirambel	Collado	Moutonianum	Papo Seco
150	Hauterivian		Vega de Pas	Rúbies	Ur Gp. - Pinilla	Llacova	Blesa	Castellar	Tera Gp. - Pinilla	Villares		Porto da Calada
150	Hauterivian		Vega de Pas	Rúbies	Ur Gp. - Pinilla	Llacova	hiatus	Castellar		Villares		Porto da Calada
150	Hauterivian		Vega de Pas	Rúbies	Ur Gp. - Pinilla	Huerva	hiatus	Castellar	Gaita			Porto da Calada
150	Valanginian		Villaro	Rúbies	Ur Gp. - Larriba	Huerva	hiatus	Castellar	Ped Gp. - Hortigüela			Porto da Calada
150	Valanginian		Villaro	Rúbies	Ped Gp. - Hortigüela	Huerva	hiatus	Castellar	Ped Gp. - Piedrahita			Porto da Calada
150	Valanginian		Villaro	Rúbies	Peñacoba	Huerva	hiatus	Galve	Ped Gp. - Piedrahita	Miravetes		Porto da Calada
150	Berriasian		Cab Gp. - Arcera	Rúbies	Valdeprado	hiatus	hiatus	Alfambra	Ped Gp. - Piedrahita	Miravetes		Porto da Calada
150	Berriasian		Cab Gp. - Arcera		TdL Gp. - Rupelo	hiatus	hiatus	Arzobispo	hiatus	Tollo		Porto da Calada
150	Berriasian		Cab Gp. - Arcera		On Gp. - Huérteles; Sierra Matute	hiatus	hiatus	Arzobispo	hiatus	Tollo		Porto da Calada
150	Tithonian		Lastres		Tera Gp. - Magaña	hiatus	Higuereles		hiatus	Tera Gp. - Magaña		Lourinhã
150	Tithonian		Lastres		Tera Gp. - Magaña	hiatus	Higuereles		Arzobispo	Tera Gp. - Magaña		Lourinhã
150	Tithonian		Lastres		Ágreda	hiatus	Higuereles		Arzobispo	Tera Gp. - Magaña		Lourinhã
Legend		Major fossiliferous, oofossiliferous, ichnofossiliferous, coproliferous, minor formation										

== See also ==
- List of dinosaur-bearing rock formations
  - List of stratigraphic units with few dinosaur genera
