= Tera Group =

Geological group in Spain

- Stratigraphic range: Tithonian-Hauterivian; ~150–135 Ma
- Type: Geologic group
- Sub-units: Magaña, Golmayo & Pinilla de los Moros Formations
- Underlies: Oncala Group
- Overlies: Jurassic

Lithology
- Primary: Sandstone, claystone

Location
- Coordinates: 41.9°N 2.5°W
- Approximate paleocoordinates: 33.3°N 8.0°E
- Region: Burgos Province
- Country: Spain
- Extent: Cameros Basin

Type section
- Named for: Tera River
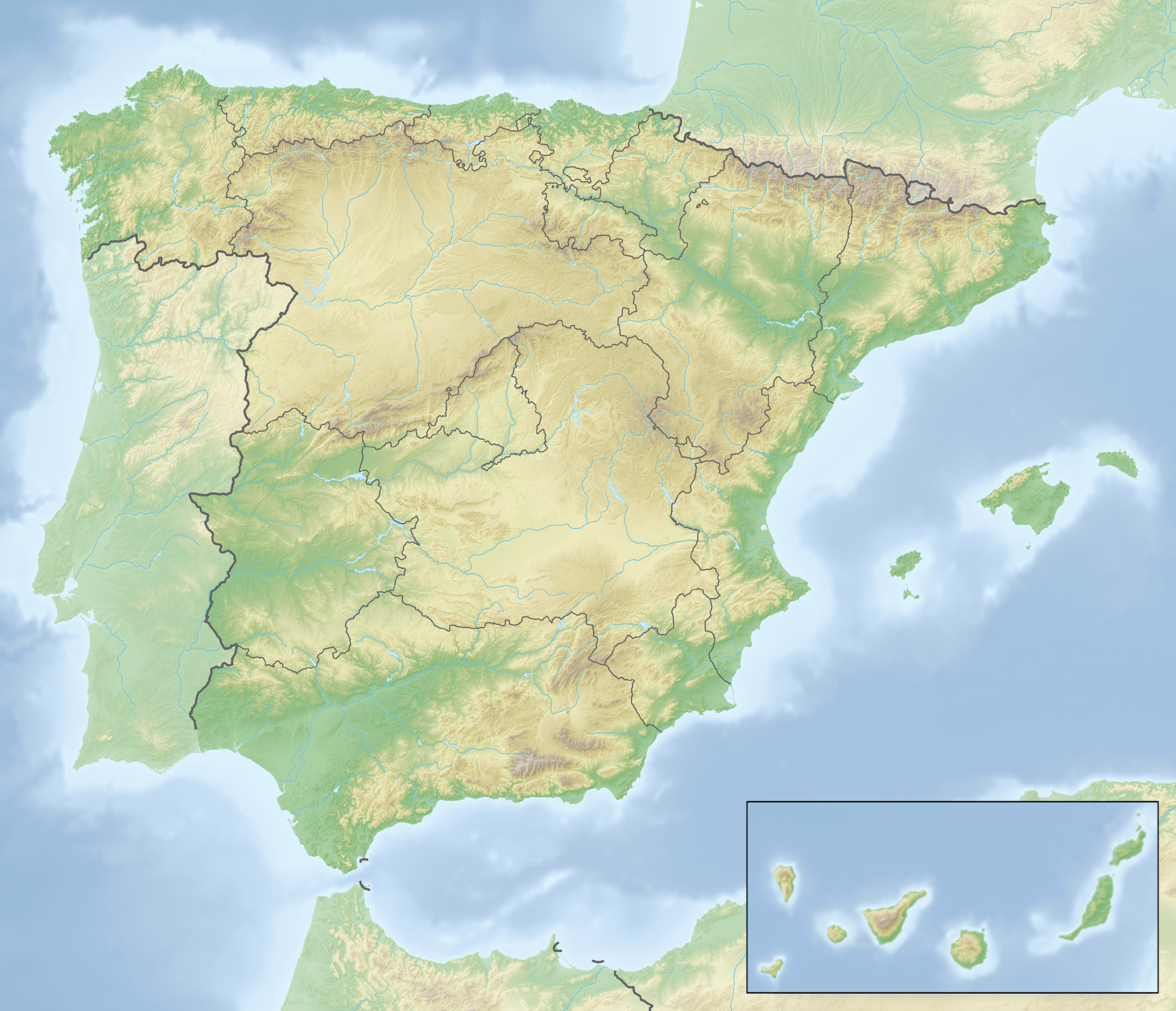
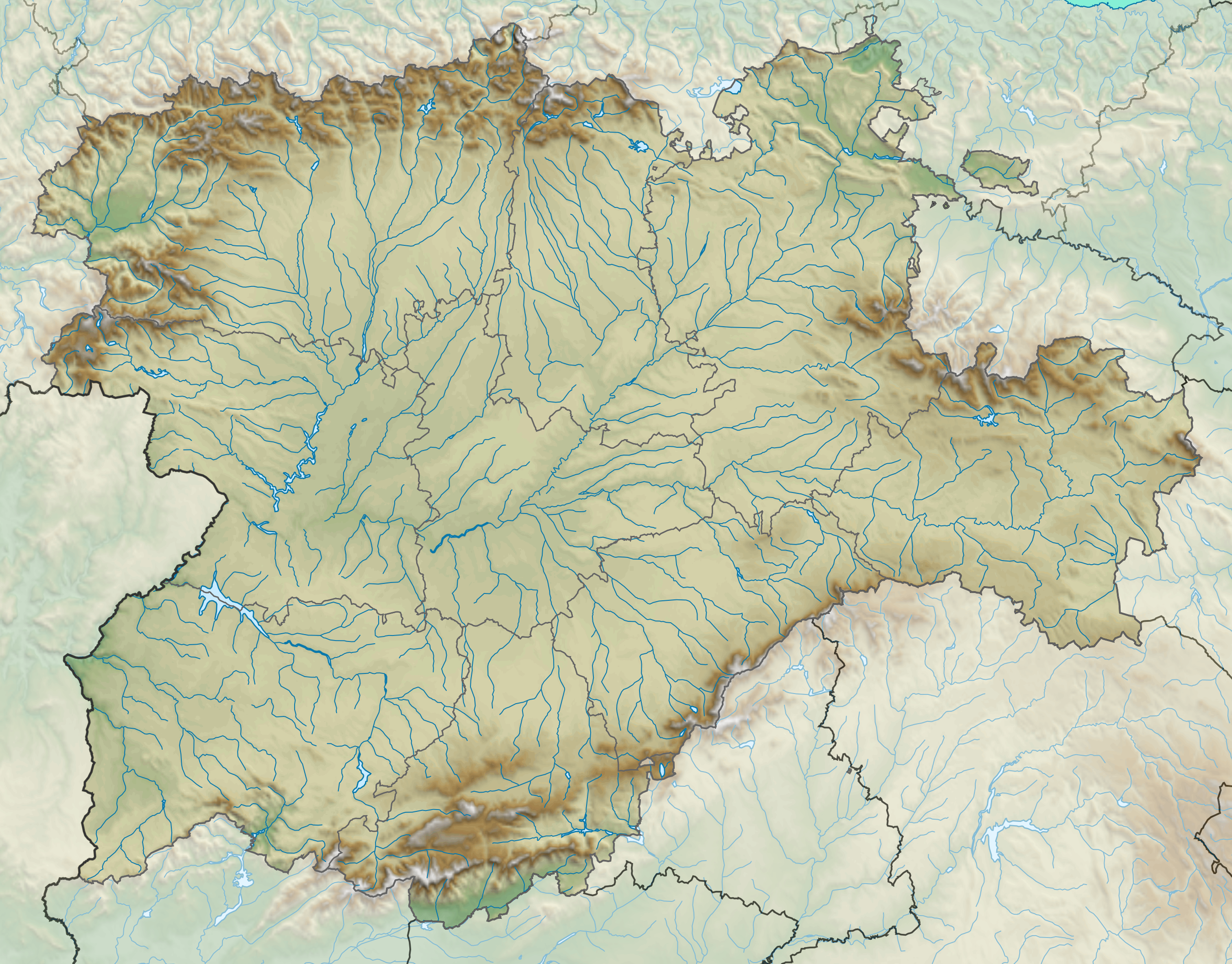
- Tera Group (Spain) Tera Group (Castile and León)

The Tera Group is a geological group in the Cameros Basin and Sierra de la Demanda in Burgos, Spain. The group contains several formations whose strata date back to the Early Cretaceous. Dinosaur remains are among the fossils that have been recovered from the formation.

== Fossil content ==
- Euornithopoda indet
- Iguanodon cf. fittoni

== Correlation ==
Early Cretaceous stratigraphy of Iberia
| Ma | Age | Paleomap \ Basins | Cantabrian | Olanyà | Cameros | Maestrazgo | Oliete | Galve | Morella | South Iberian | Pre-betic | Lusitanian |
|---|---|---|---|---|---|---|---|---|---|---|---|---|
| 100 | Cenomanian | | La Cabana | Sopeira | Utrillas | | Mosquerela | | | | | Caranguejeira |
| 100 | Cenomanian | | Altamira | Sopeira | Utrillas | | | | | | | Caranguejeira |
| 100 | Cenomanian | | Eguino | Sopeira | Utrillas | | | | | | | Caranguejeira |
| 125 | Albian | | Ullaga - Balmaseda | Lluçà | Utrillas | | | | | Traiguera | | Caranguejeira |
| 125 | Albian | | Monte Grande | Lluçà | Escucha | | Escucha | | | Jijona | | Caranguejeira |
| 125 | Albian | | Itxina - Miono | Lluçà | Escucha | | Escucha | | | | | Caranguejeira |
| 125 | Aptian | | Valmaseda - Tellamendi | Lluçà | Ol Gp. - Castrillo | Benassal | Escucha | Benassal | | | | Olhos |
| 125 | Aptian | | Valmaseda - Tellamendi | Font | En Gp. - Leza | Morella/Oliete | Oliete | Villaroya | Morella | Capas; Rojas | | Almargem |
| 125 | Aptian | | Patrocinio - Ernaga | Senyús | En Gp. - Jubela | Forcall | | | Morella | Villaroya | Upper; Bedoulian | Figueira |
| 125 | Barremian | | Vega de Pas | Cabó | Abejar | Xert | Alacón | Xert | Morella | Huérguina | Upper; Bedoulian | Assises |
| 125 | Barremian | | Vega de Pas | Prada | Abejar | Artoles | | | Morella | Collado | Moutonianum | Papo Seco |
| 125 | Barremian | | Vega de Pas | Rúbies | Tera Gp. - Golmayo | Alacón/Blesa | Blesa | Camarillas | Mirambel | Collado | Moutonianum | Papo Seco |
| 150 | Hauterivian | | Vega de Pas | Rúbies | Ur Gp. - Pinilla | Llacova | Blesa | Castellar | Tera Gp. - Pinilla | Villares | | Porto da Calada |
| 150 | Hauterivian | | Vega de Pas | Rúbies | Ur Gp. - Pinilla | Llacova | hiatus | Castellar | | Villares | | Porto da Calada |
| 150 | Hauterivian | | Vega de Pas | Rúbies | Ur Gp. - Pinilla | Huerva | hiatus | Castellar | Gaita | | | Porto da Calada |
| 150 | Valanginian | | Villaro | Rúbies | Ur Gp. - Larriba | Huerva | hiatus | Castellar | Ped Gp. - Hortigüela | | | Porto da Calada |
| 150 | Valanginian | | Villaro | Rúbies | Ped Gp. - Hortigüela | Huerva | hiatus | Castellar | Ped Gp. - Piedrahita | | | Porto da Calada |
| 150 | Valanginian | | Villaro | Rúbies | Peñacoba | Huerva | hiatus | Galve | Ped Gp. - Piedrahita | Miravetes | | Porto da Calada |
| 150 | Berriasian | | Cab Gp. - Arcera | Rúbies | Valdeprado | hiatus | hiatus | Alfambra | Ped Gp. - Piedrahita | Miravetes | | Porto da Calada |
| 150 | Berriasian | | Cab Gp. - Arcera | | TdL Gp. - Rupelo | hiatus | hiatus | Arzobispo | hiatus | Tollo | | Porto da Calada |
| 150 | Berriasian | | Cab Gp. - Arcera | | On Gp. - Huérteles; Sierra Matute | hiatus | hiatus | Arzobispo | hiatus | Tollo | | Porto da Calada |
| 150 | Tithonian | | Lastres | | Tera Gp. - Magaña | hiatus | Higuereles | | hiatus | Tera Gp. - Magaña | | Lourinhã |
| 150 | Tithonian | | Lastres | | Tera Gp. - Magaña | hiatus | Higuereles | | Arzobispo | Tera Gp. - Magaña | | Lourinhã |
| 150 | Tithonian | | Lastres | | Ágreda | hiatus | Higuereles | | Arzobispo | Tera Gp. - Magaña | | Lourinhã |
| Legend | | Major fossiliferous, oofossiliferous, ichnofossiliferous, coproliferous, minor formation | | | | | | | | | | |

== See also ==
- List of dinosaur-bearing rock formations
