= Blesa Formation =

- Stratigraphic range: Barremian
- Type: Geological formation
- Unit of: Maestrazgo Basin
- Sub-units: Upper Blesa Sequence - Valdejunco Member; Middle Blesa Sequence - Josa Member; Lower Blesa Sequence - Cabezo Gordo Member, Morenillo member
- Underlies: Alacón Formation
- Overlies: Unconformity with Jurassic strata
- Thickness: Up to 150 m

Lithology
- Primary: Clay, Marl, Limestone
- Other: Conglomerate

Location
- Region: Europe
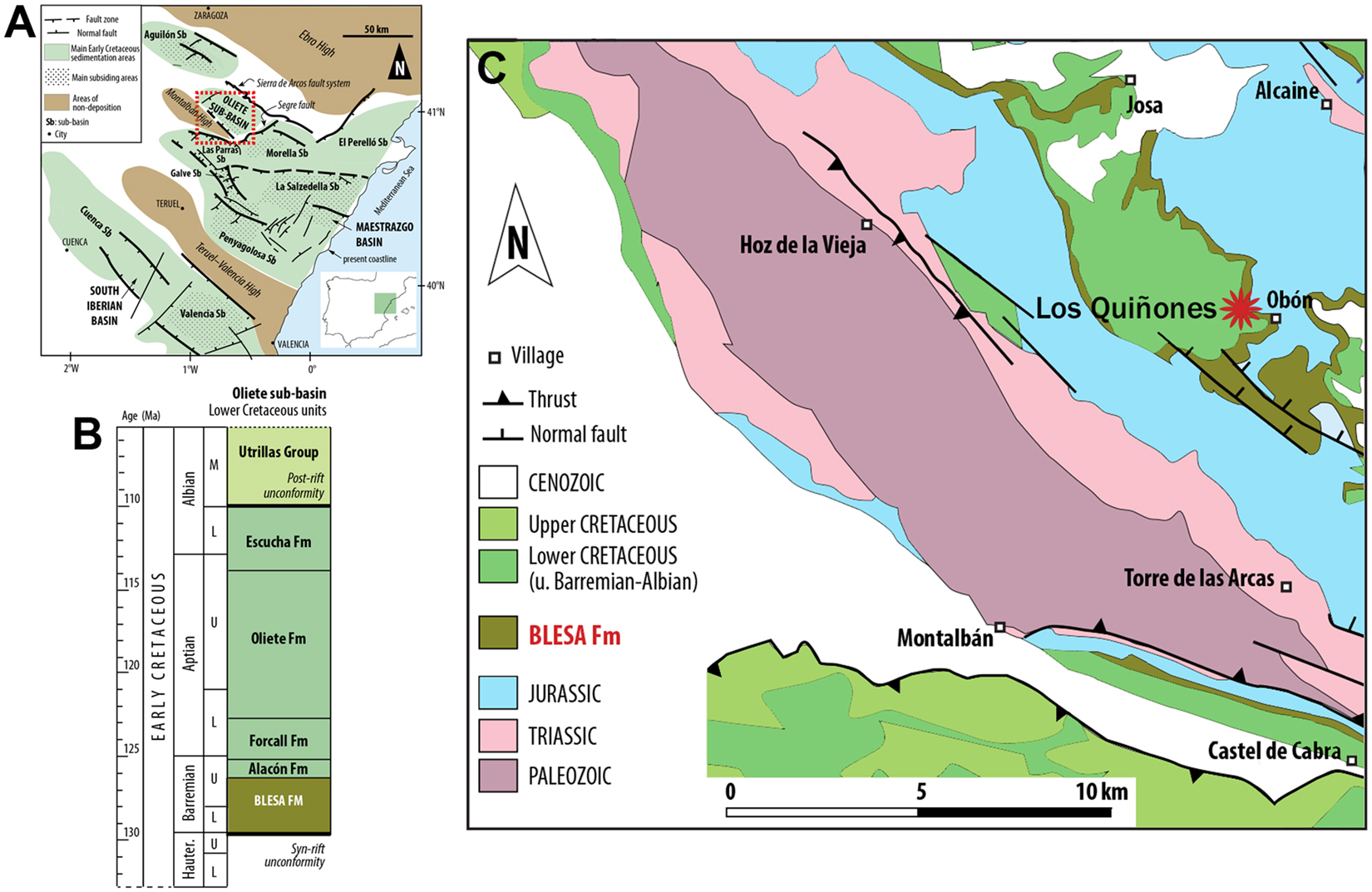
- Distribution of the Belsa Formation within the Oliete Sub-Basin (in olive)

The Blesa Formation is a geological formation in Teruel and La Rioja, Spain whose strata date back to the Barremian of the Early Cretaceous. Dinosaur remains as well as eggs are among the fossils that have been recovered from the formation. Along with the fragmentary anhanguerian pterosaur Iberodactylus. While the lower and upper parts of the formation were deposited in a continental setting, the middle portion of the formation is largely nearshore marine, with remains of plesiosaurs.

== Stratigraphy and Lithology ==
The Belsa Formation is found within the Maestrazgo Basin. Within the stratigraphic sequence it overlies Jurassic rocks in a syn-rift unconformity, and underlies the Alacón Formation.

The formation is up to 150 metres thick and is divided into three distinct unconformity bounded units, which are called the Lower, Middle and Upper Blesa Sequences. The Lower Blesa sequence varies greatly in thickness from less than 10 m up to 100 m is divided up into two members, the lower Cabezo Gordo Member, which consists of red clays and the upper Morenillo Member, which consists of limestones and marls, both of these sequences were deposited in a continental setting. The Middle Blesa Sequence is of a fairly uniform 25-50 metre thickness. Most of the sequence consists of the Josa Member, which consists of oyster rich marls and limestones deposited in a coastal or shallow restricted bay environment. The Upper Blesa Sequence is of variable thickness from 15 to 70 m. The lower 1–10 m consists of continentally derived clays and marls with sandstone and conglomerate intercalations while the upper 10–60 m are dominated by carbonates.

== Vertebrate paleofauna ==
=== Reptiles ===
Reptiles of the Blesa Formation
Taxa	Species	Presence	Material	Notes	Images
Iguanodontia	Indeterminate	Lower Blesa Sequence		3 distinct taxa, one of which has affinities with Delapparentia	
Iguanodontia	Unnamed	Upper Blesa Sequence		"Vertebrae, ribs, left illium, partial sacrum, and partial left tibia."	
Ankylosauria	Indeterminate	Lower Blesa Sequence	"Isolated teeth, dermal plates and vertebra"		
Spinosauridae	Indeterminate	Lower, Upper Blesa Sequence	Isolated Teeth		
Dromaeosauridae	Indeterminate	Lower Blesa Sequence	Isolated Teeth		
?Carcharodontosauridae	Indeterminate	Lower, Upper Blesa Sequence	Isolated Teeth		
Euhelopidae	Indeterminate	Lower Blesa Sequence	Isolated Teeth		
Sauropoda	Indeterminate	Lower Blesa Sequence, La Cantalera-1	Post-cranial material		
Crocodylomorpha	Indeterminate	Lower Blesa Sequence		Possibly four distinct taxa	
Plesiosauria	Indeterminate	Middle Blesa Sequence			

==== Pterosaurs ====
Pterosaurs of the Blesa Formation
Taxa	Species	Presence	Material	Notes	Images
Istiodactylidae	Indeterminate	Lower Blesa Sequence	Isolated Teeth		
Ornithocheiridae	Indeterminate	Lower Blesa Sequence	Isolated Teeth		
Iberodactylus	I. andreui	Middle Blesa Sequence	Partial skull		

=== Mammals ===
Mammals of the Blesa Formation
Taxa	Species	Presence	Material	Notes	Images
Cantalera	C. abadi	Lower Blesa Sequence	Teeth	Pinheirodontid	
Eobataar	Indeterminate	Lower Blesa Sequence	Teeth		

== Correlation ==
Early Cretaceous stratigraphy of Iberia
Ma	Age	Paleomap \ Basins	Cantabrian	Olanyà	Cameros	Maestrazgo	Oliete	Galve	Morella	South Iberian	Pre-betic	Lusitanian
100	Cenomanian		La Cabana	Sopeira	Utrillas		Mosquerela					Caranguejeira
100	Cenomanian		Altamira	Sopeira	Utrillas							Caranguejeira
100	Cenomanian		Eguino	Sopeira	Utrillas							Caranguejeira
125	Albian		Ullaga - Balmaseda	Lluçà	Utrillas					Traiguera		Caranguejeira
125	Albian		Monte Grande	Lluçà	Escucha		Escucha			Jijona		Caranguejeira
125	Albian		Itxina - Miono	Lluçà	Escucha		Escucha					Caranguejeira
125	Aptian		Valmaseda - Tellamendi	Lluçà	Ol Gp. - Castrillo	Benassal	Escucha	Benassal				Olhos
125	Aptian		Valmaseda - Tellamendi	Font	En Gp. - Leza	Morella/Oliete	Oliete	Villaroya	Morella	Capas; Rojas		Almargem
125	Aptian		Patrocinio - Ernaga	Senyús	En Gp. - Jubela	Forcall			Morella	Villaroya	Upper; Bedoulian	Figueira
125	Barremian		Vega de Pas	Cabó	Abejar	Xert	Alacón	Xert	Morella	Huérguina	Upper; Bedoulian	Assises
125	Barremian		Vega de Pas	Prada	Abejar	Artoles			Morella	Collado	Moutonianum	Papo Seco
125	Barremian		Vega de Pas	Rúbies	Tera Gp. - Golmayo	Alacón/Blesa	Blesa	Camarillas	Mirambel	Collado	Moutonianum	Papo Seco
150	Hauterivian		Vega de Pas	Rúbies	Ur Gp. - Pinilla	Llacova	Blesa	Castellar	Tera Gp. - Pinilla	Villares		Porto da Calada
150	Hauterivian		Vega de Pas	Rúbies	Ur Gp. - Pinilla	Llacova	hiatus	Castellar		Villares		Porto da Calada
150	Hauterivian		Vega de Pas	Rúbies	Ur Gp. - Pinilla	Huerva	hiatus	Castellar	Gaita			Porto da Calada
150	Valanginian		Villaro	Rúbies	Ur Gp. - Larriba	Huerva	hiatus	Castellar	Ped Gp. - Hortigüela			Porto da Calada
150	Valanginian		Villaro	Rúbies	Ped Gp. - Hortigüela	Huerva	hiatus	Castellar	Ped Gp. - Piedrahita			Porto da Calada
150	Valanginian		Villaro	Rúbies	Peñacoba	Huerva	hiatus	Galve	Ped Gp. - Piedrahita	Miravetes		Porto da Calada
150	Berriasian		Cab Gp. - Arcera	Rúbies	Valdeprado	hiatus	hiatus	Alfambra	Ped Gp. - Piedrahita	Miravetes		Porto da Calada
150	Berriasian		Cab Gp. - Arcera		TdL Gp. - Rupelo	hiatus	hiatus	Arzobispo	hiatus	Tollo		Porto da Calada
150	Berriasian		Cab Gp. - Arcera		On Gp. - Huérteles; Sierra Matute	hiatus	hiatus	Arzobispo	hiatus	Tollo		Porto da Calada
150	Tithonian		Lastres		Tera Gp. - Magaña	hiatus	Higuereles		hiatus	Tera Gp. - Magaña		Lourinhã
150	Tithonian		Lastres		Tera Gp. - Magaña	hiatus	Higuereles		Arzobispo	Tera Gp. - Magaña		Lourinhã
150	Tithonian		Lastres		Ágreda	hiatus	Higuereles		Arzobispo	Tera Gp. - Magaña		Lourinhã
Legend		Major fossiliferous, oofossiliferous, ichnofossiliferous, coproliferous, minor formation										

== See also ==
- List of dinosaur-bearing rock formations
