= Oblitosaurus =

Oblitosaurus Temporal range: Late Jurassic, Kimmeridgian–Tithonian
- Skeletal reconstruction

Scientific classification
- Kingdom: Animalia
- Phylum: Chordata
- Class: Reptilia
- Clade: Dinosauria
- Clade: †Ornithischia
- Clade: †Ornithopoda
- Clade: †Ankylopollexia
- Genus: †Oblitosaurus; Sánchez-Fenollosa et al., 2023
- Species: †O. bunnueli

Binomial name
- †Oblitosaurus bunnueli Sánchez-Fenollosa et al., 2023

Genus of ankylopollexian dinosaur from the Late Jurassic period

Oblitosaurus (meaning "forgotten lizard") is a genus of ankylopollexian ornithopod dinosaur from the Late Jurassic Villar del Arzobispo Formation of Spain. The type species is Oblitosaurus bunnueli.

== Discovery and naming ==
The type specimens of Oblitosaurus consist of a dentary tooth (CPT-1440), an ungual pollex from the left manus (CPT-1444), and an almost complete left hindlimb (MAP-8290 to MAP-8299). Large footprints from the same area may also belong to this taxon.

The skeletal remains were identified as belonging to a new genus and species of ornithopod, Oblitosaurus bunnueli, in 2023. The generic name, "Oblitosaurus", comes from the Latin "oblitus", meaning "obsolete" or "forgotten", and the Greek word "sauros", meaning "lizard", referring to how its fossils were the last to be found from the site where they were discovered. The specific name, "bunnueli", honors Spanish filmmaker Luis Buñuel.

== Description ==
Size compared to a human

Oblitosaurus has been estimated as being 6–7 metres (20–23 ft) long, larger than its close relatives Camptosaurus and Draconyx. This makes it the largest ornithopod known from Europe in the Late Jurassic.

== Classification ==
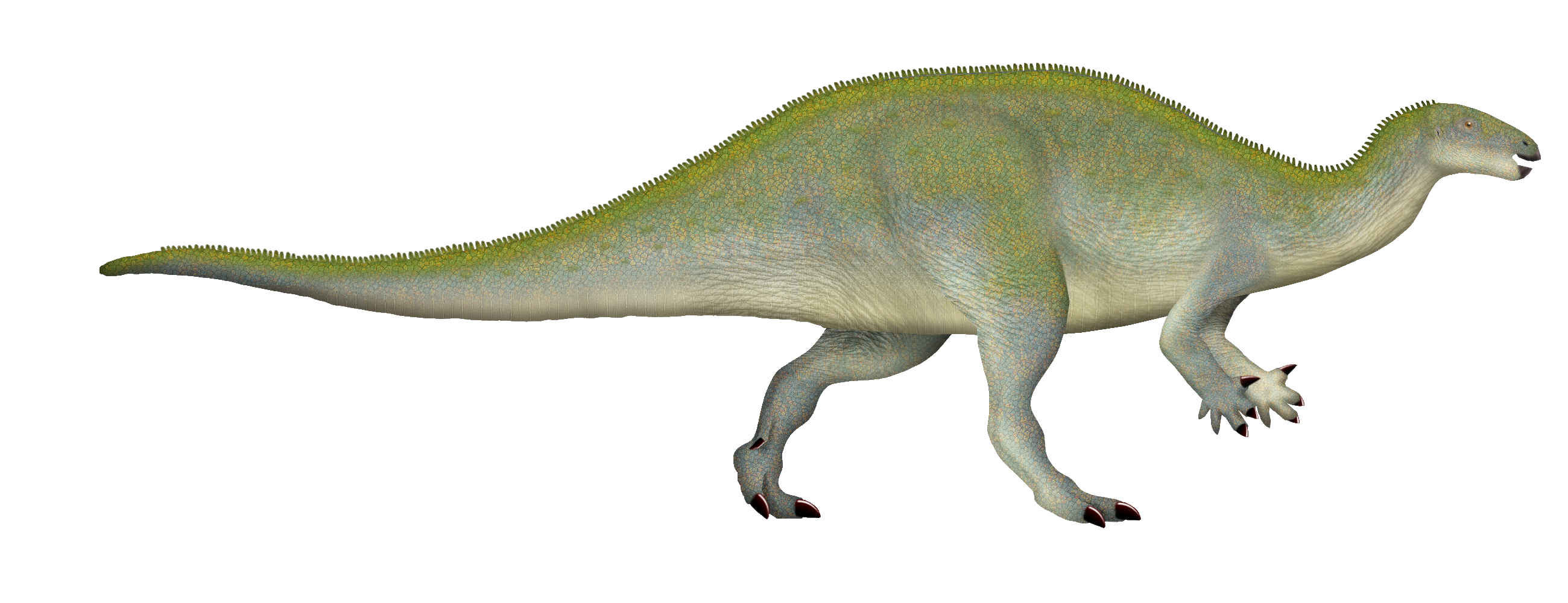
Life restoration

Sánchez-Fenollosa et al. (2023) placed Oblitosaurus in a phylogenetic analysis and found it to be a basal ankylopollexian as the sister taxon to Draconyx, forming a European ankylopollexian clade that did not seem to appear in North America. Furthermore, their analysis also supports a monophyly of Camptosaurus, showing for the first time all the species assigned to it in a single clade. The results of their phylogenetic analysis are displayed in the cladogram below.

- Iguanodontia
  - Rhabdodontidae
  - - Tenontosaurus tilletti
    - - Dryosauridae
      - Ankylopollexia
        - - Draconyx
          - Oblitosaurus
        - - Camptosauridae
            - Camptosaurus dispar
            - - Camptosaurus prestwichii (Cumnoria)
              - Camptosaurus aphanoecetes (Uteodon)
          - Styracosterna
            - Dakotadon
            - - Hippodraco
              - - Iguanacolossus
                - - Proa
                  - - Lanzhousaurus
                    - - Hypselospinus
                      - - Bayannurosaurus
                        - - Ouranosaurus
                          - Hadrosauriformes
                            - Iguanodontidae
                            - Hadrosauroidea

== Paleoenvironment ==
Apart from Oblitosaurus, the Villar del Arzobispo Formation also produced the remains of many other animals, including a distinct Camptosaurus-like ornithopod known from vertebrae, a stegosaur similar to Dacentrurus, and various sauropods, such as Turiasaurus, Losillasaurus, Galvesaurus, and Aragosaurus.
