= Galverpeton =

Galverpeton Temporal range: Early Cretaceous

Scientific classification
- Domain: Eukaryota
- Kingdom: Animalia
- Phylum: Chordata
- Class: Amphibia
- Clade: Caudata
- Genus: †Galverpeton; Estes & Sanchíz, 1982

Type species
- †G. ibericum Estes & Sanchíz, 1982

Extinct genus of amphibians

Galverpeton is an extinct genus of prehistoric salamander. It lived during the Barremian-Aptian stages in the Early Cretaceous, in what is now Western Europe. The type species, Galverpeton ibericum, was described by Estes and Sanchíz in 1982. It was found in the Castellar Formation, part of the Galve fossil assemblage. The fossil is in the Institut Paleontologic Miquel Crusafont, Sabadell.

It is related to Apricosiren, Bishara, Hylaeobatrachus, Marmorerpeton, and Ramonellus.

== See also ==
- Prehistoric amphibian
- List of prehistoric amphibians
