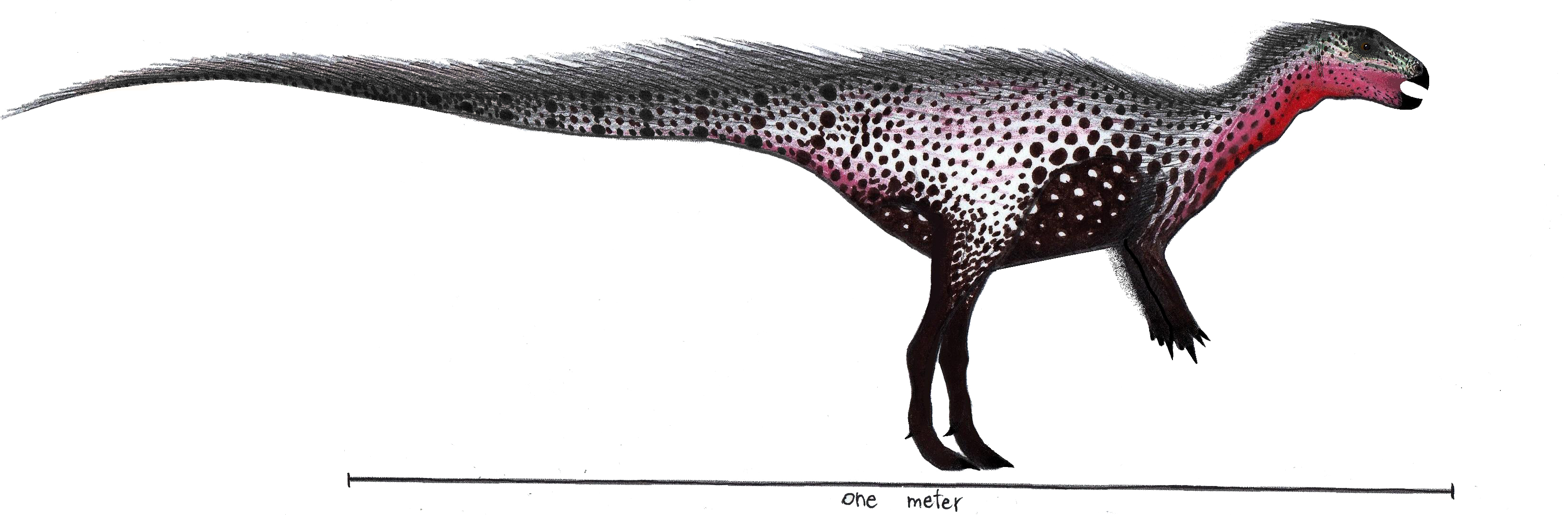
- Restoration of Gideonmantellia

Scientific classification
- Domain: Eukaryota
- Kingdom: Animalia
- Phylum: Chordata
- Clade: Dinosauria
- Clade: †Ornithischia
- Clade: †Ornithopoda
- Genus: †Gideonmantellia; Ruiz-Omeñaca et al., 2012

Type species
- †Gideonmantellia amosanjuanae Ruiz-Omeñaca et al., 2012

= Gideonmantellia =

Gideonmantellia Temporal range: Early Cretaceous, Barremian

Extinct genus of dinosaurs

Gideonmantellia is an extinct genus of basal ornithopod dinosaur known from the Early Cretaceous (Barremian stage) Camarillas Formation of Galve, Province of Teruel, Spain. It contains a single species, Gideonmantellia amosanjuanae.

== Discovery and naming ==
In 1982, amateur palaeontologist José María Herrero Marzo together with his son Jesús uncovered in a loam pit near Galve, the Poyales Barranco Canales site, the remains of a small euornithopod. In 1987 from this material by José Luis Sanz a left femur and ilium were described, which he referred to Hypsilophodon foxii. In 1995 José Ignacio Ruiz-Omeñaca realised the find represented a separate taxon, after he had further prepared the bones in 1994 and 1995. Ruiz-Omeñaca continued his studies from 1996, as part of his thesis. In 2001 he published a more detailed and complete description, in 2004 reaffirming that a new species had been discovered. In 2006, in his doctoral thesis he named this Gideonmantellia amosanjuanae; as a nomen ex dissertatione this name was as yet invalid though.

In 2012, the type species Gideonmantellia amosanjuanae was validly named and redescribed by Ruiz-Omeñaca, José Ignacio Canudo, Gloria Cuenca-Bescós, Penélope Cruzado-Caballero, José Manuel Gasca and Miguel Moreno-Azanza. The generic name honours the first describer of Hypsilophodon, Gideon Mantell. The specific name honours the late palaeontologist Olga María Amo Sanjuán, who studied the Cretaceous Galve fauna.

The holotype, MPG-PBCH, was found in a fluvial deposit of the Camarillas Formation, dating from the early Barremian. It consists of a partial articulated skeleton, lacking the skull, of a juvenile individual, including thirty-three vertebrae of the back, hip and tail, twenty-one fragments of the neural arches, six chevrons, rib fragments, ossified tendons, the left pelvis and both hindlimbs. The specimen is part of the collection of the Museo Paleontológico de Galve and displayed in the palaeontological hall of the townhall of Galve.

== Phylogeny ==
The taxon was in 1995 and 2001 assigned to the Hypsilophodontidae. Today this is considered an unnatural paraphyletic group and Gideonmantellia was in 2012 placed in a relatively basal position in the group Ornithopoda. More recently, a 2017 study by Madzia et al. describing the genus Burianosaurus found Gideonmantellia to be the most basal ornithopod. The cladogram is reproduced below:

- Clypeodonta
  - Hypsilophodon
  - Cerapoda
    - Marginocephalia
    - Ornithopoda
      - Gideonmantellia
      - - Elasmaria
        - - Burianosaurus
          - Iguanodontia
            - Rhabdodontomorpha
              - Muttaburrasaurus
              - Rhabdodontidae
            - - Tenontosaurus
              - Dryomorpha
                - Dryosauridae
                - Ankylopollexia
                  - Camptosaurus
                  - - Iguanodon
                    - Ouranosaurus
