= Papo Seco Formation =

Geologic formation in Portugal

- Stratigraphic range: Early Barremian; ~125–122 Ma
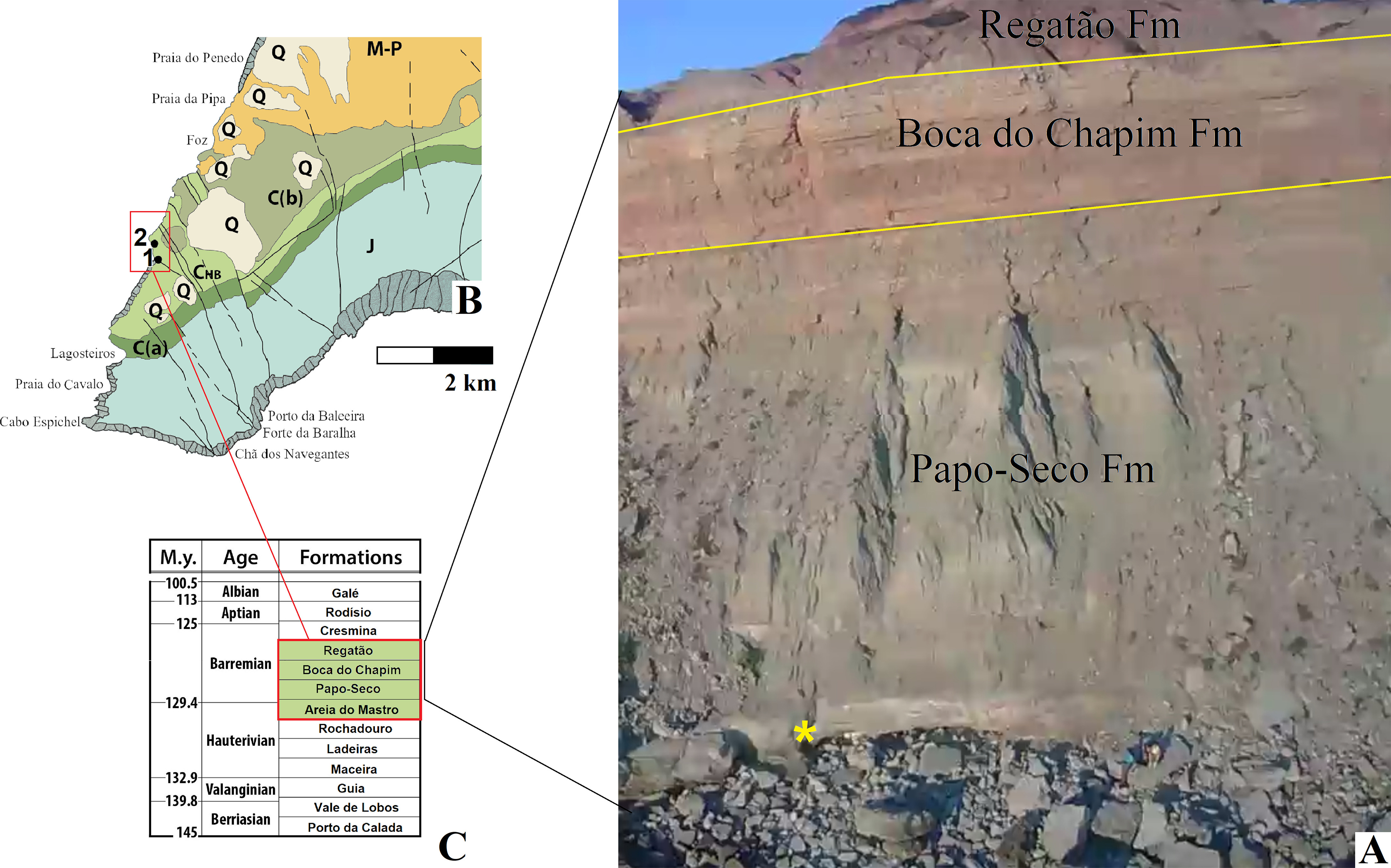
- The Papo Seco Formation outcrops towards the bottom of the Praia do Areia do Mastro site
- Type: Geological formation
- Underlies: Assises à Orbitolines Formation
- Overlies: Porto da Calada Formation

Lithology
- Primary: Mudstone, siltstone
- Other: Sandstone

Location
- Coordinates: 38.4°N 9.2°W
- Approximate paleocoordinates: 31.8°N 1.3°E
- Region: Setubal
- Country: Portugal
- Extent: Lusitanian Basin
- Papo Seco Formation (Portugal)

The Papo Seco Formation is a geological formation in Portugal, whose strata date back to the Early Cretaceous. Dinosaur fossils are among the fossils that have been recovered from the formation.

== Name ==
The unit was previously referred to as the "Gres a Dinosauriens", due to the abundant dinosaur remains found in the past.

== Description ==
The Papo Seco Formation (Rey, 1992) marks the return to clastic-dominated sedimentation. Exposure of the formation is found above the low cliff between Rochadouro and Areia do Mastro, and on the foreshore and beach at Boca do Chapim. The Papo Seco Formation is dominated by silty mud-mud deposition. This is interbedded with medium to coarse, commonly ribbon shaped, clastic sandstones. Along the exposure, between Rochadouro and Boca do Chapim, the clastic sands are not laterally continuous. The exposure clearly shows that the ribbon sands are isolated and change laterally into muds. Three distinct sand facies have been identified within the Papo Seco Formation.

== Vertebrate paleofauna ==
Color key: Taxon / Reclassified taxon / Taxon falsely reported as present / Dubious taxon or junior synonym / Ichnotaxon / Ootaxon / Morphotaxon	Notes; Uncertain or tentative taxa are in small text; ~~crossed out~~ taxa are discredited.

=== Pseudosuchia ===
Pseudosuchians of the Papo Seco Formation
Genus	Species	Presence	Materials	Notes	Images
cf. Anteophthalmosuchus	cf. A. sp.	Praia do Areia do Mastro	Five teeth		

=== Pterosaurs ===
Pterosaurs of the Papo Seco Formation
Genus	Species	Presence	Materials	Notes	Images
Ornithocheiridae	indeterminate	Praia do Areia do Mastro	Single tooth		
Ctenochasmatoidea	indeterminate	Praia do Areia do Mastro	Two teeth		

==== Ornithischians ====
Ornithischians of the Papo Seco Formation
Genus	Species	Presence	Materials	Notes	Images
Cariocecus	C. bocagei	Praia do Areia do Mastro	A partial skull	A hadrosauroid ornithopod, which represents the first iguanodontian skull found in Portugal	Cariocecus bocagei
Ornithopoda	Indeterminate	Boca do Chapim; Praia do Areia do Mastro		Previous supposed reports of Mantellisaurus and Iguanodon cannot be substantiated	Cariocecus bocagei
Iguanodontia	Indeterminate	Boca do Chapim; Praia do Areia do Mastro		Previous supposed reports of Mantellisaurus and Iguanodon cannot be substantiated	Cariocecus bocagei
cf. Styracosterna	Indeterminate	Boca do Chapim; Praia do Areia do Mastro		Previous supposed reports of Mantellisaurus and Iguanodon cannot be substantiated	Cariocecus bocagei

==== Saurischians ====
Saurischians of the Papo Seco Formation
Genus	Species	Presence	Materials	Notes	Images
cf. Dromaeosauridae indet.	Indeterminate	Praia do Areia do Mastro			Iberospinus natarioi
Iberospinus	I. natarioi	Praia de Aguncheiras	Several assorted bones consist of dentary fragments, teeth, an incomplete right scapula, partial dorsal and caudal vertebrae, rib fragments, a partial pubis, two incomplete calcanea, and a pedal ungual phalanx.	Was once thought to be a specimen of Baryonyx.	Iberospinus natarioi
Paraves indet.	Indeterminate	Boca do Chapim	Forelimb elements including humerus, ulna and carpal bone, at least from two individuals		Iberospinus natarioi
Suchosaurus	S. girardi	Boca do Chapim	Two fragment specimens consists of a mandible and one tooth	Was considered a species of Baryonyx	Iberospinus natarioi
Titanosauriformes indet.	Indeterminate	Boca do Chapim		Was referred to "Pleurocoelus" valdensis	Iberospinus natarioi
Theropoda indet.	Indeterminate	Boca do Chapim		Including Megalosaurus superbus, now known as Erectopus"	Iberospinus natarioi
Theropoda indet.	Indeterminate	Praia do Areia do Mastro			Iberospinus natarioi

== Correlation ==
Early Cretaceous stratigraphy of Iberia
Ma	Age	Paleomap \ Basins	Cantabrian	Olanyà	Cameros	Maestrazgo	Oliete	Galve	Morella	South Iberian	Pre-betic	Lusitanian
100	Cenomanian		La Cabana	Sopeira	Utrillas		Mosquerela					Caranguejeira
100	Cenomanian		Altamira	Sopeira	Utrillas							Caranguejeira
100	Cenomanian		Eguino	Sopeira	Utrillas							Caranguejeira
125	Albian		Ullaga - Balmaseda	Lluçà	Utrillas					Traiguera		Caranguejeira
125	Albian		Monte Grande	Lluçà	Escucha		Escucha			Jijona		Caranguejeira
125	Albian		Itxina - Miono	Lluçà	Escucha		Escucha					Caranguejeira
125	Aptian		Valmaseda - Tellamendi	Lluçà	Ol Gp. - Castrillo	Benassal	Escucha	Benassal				Olhos
125	Aptian		Valmaseda - Tellamendi	Font	En Gp. - Leza	Morella/Oliete	Oliete	Villaroya	Morella	Capas; Rojas		Almargem
125	Aptian		Patrocinio - Ernaga	Senyús	En Gp. - Jubela	Forcall			Morella	Villaroya	Upper; Bedoulian	Figueira
125	Barremian		Vega de Pas	Cabó	Abejar	Xert	Alacón	Xert	Morella	Huérguina	Upper; Bedoulian	Assises
125	Barremian		Vega de Pas	Prada	Abejar	Artoles			Morella	Collado	Moutonianum	Papo Seco
125	Barremian		Vega de Pas	Rúbies	Tera Gp. - Golmayo	Alacón/Blesa	Blesa	Camarillas	Mirambel	Collado	Moutonianum	Papo Seco
150	Hauterivian		Vega de Pas	Rúbies	Ur Gp. - Pinilla	Llacova	Blesa	Castellar	Tera Gp. - Pinilla	Villares		Porto da Calada
150	Hauterivian		Vega de Pas	Rúbies	Ur Gp. - Pinilla	Llacova	hiatus	Castellar		Villares		Porto da Calada
150	Hauterivian		Vega de Pas	Rúbies	Ur Gp. - Pinilla	Huerva	hiatus	Castellar	Gaita			Porto da Calada
150	Valanginian		Villaro	Rúbies	Ur Gp. - Larriba	Huerva	hiatus	Castellar	Ped Gp. - Hortigüela			Porto da Calada
150	Valanginian		Villaro	Rúbies	Ped Gp. - Hortigüela	Huerva	hiatus	Castellar	Ped Gp. - Piedrahita			Porto da Calada
150	Valanginian		Villaro	Rúbies	Peñacoba	Huerva	hiatus	Galve	Ped Gp. - Piedrahita	Miravetes		Porto da Calada
150	Berriasian		Cab Gp. - Arcera	Rúbies	Valdeprado	hiatus	hiatus	Alfambra	Ped Gp. - Piedrahita	Miravetes		Porto da Calada
150	Berriasian		Cab Gp. - Arcera		TdL Gp. - Rupelo	hiatus	hiatus	Arzobispo	hiatus	Tollo		Porto da Calada
150	Berriasian		Cab Gp. - Arcera		On Gp. - Huérteles; Sierra Matute	hiatus	hiatus	Arzobispo	hiatus	Tollo		Porto da Calada
150	Tithonian		Lastres		Tera Gp. - Magaña	hiatus	Higuereles		hiatus	Tera Gp. - Magaña		Lourinhã
150	Tithonian		Lastres		Tera Gp. - Magaña	hiatus	Higuereles		Arzobispo	Tera Gp. - Magaña		Lourinhã
150	Tithonian		Lastres		Ágreda	hiatus	Higuereles		Arzobispo	Tera Gp. - Magaña		Lourinhã
Legend		Major fossiliferous, oofossiliferous, ichnofossiliferous, coproliferous, minor formation										

== See also ==
- List of dinosaur-bearing rock formations
