= Camarillas Formation =

Geological formation in Aragon, Spain

- Stratigraphic range: Barremian; ~130–125 Ma
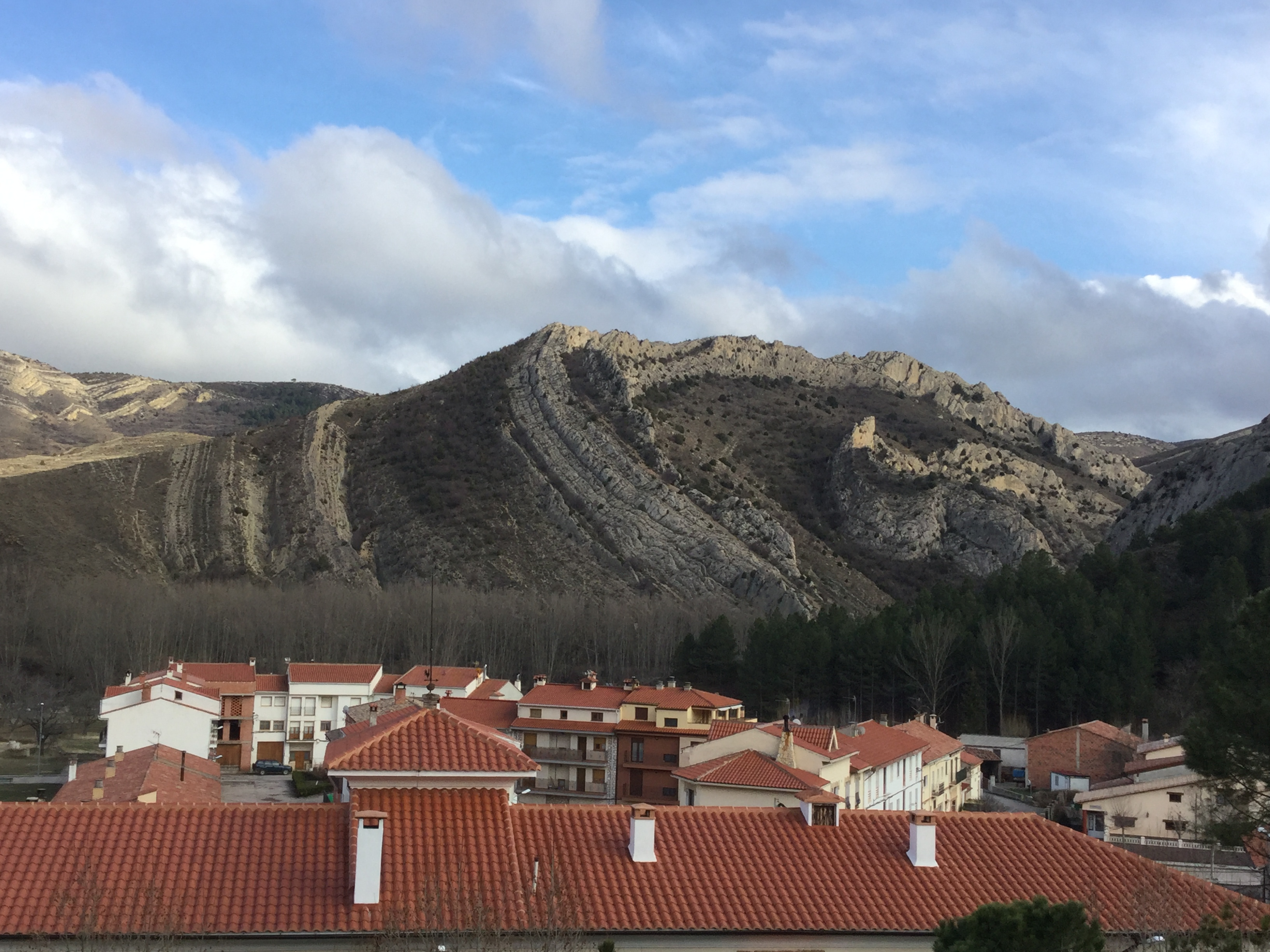
- The Camarillas Formation crops out in the geological park of Aliaga
- Type: Geological formation
- Underlies: Artoles Formation
- Overlies: El Castellar Formation
- Thickness: 300–800 m (980–2,620 ft)

Lithology
- Primary: Sandstone, mudstone
- Other: Conglomerate

Location
- Coordinates: 40.7°N 0.9°W
- Approximate paleocoordinates: 30.7°N 9.2°E
- Region: Teruel, Aragón
- Country: Spain
- Extent: Galve Basin

Type section
- Named for: Camarillas
- Named by: Canérot et al.
- Year defined: 1982
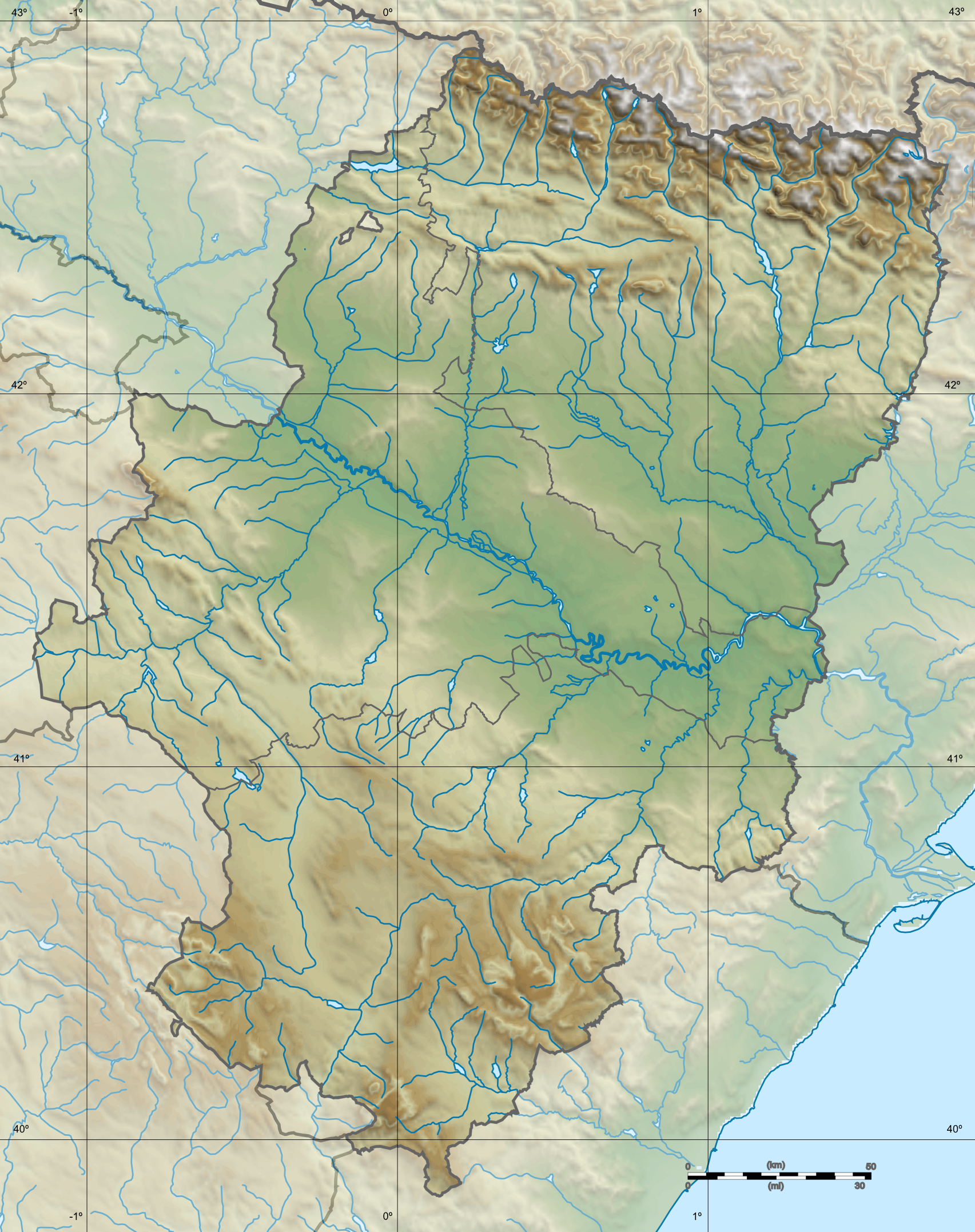
- Camarillas Formation (Spain) Camarillas Formation (Aragon)

The Camarillas Formation is a geological formation in the Teruel Province of Aragón, Spain whose strata date back to the Early Cretaceous (Barremian stage). The sandstones, mudstones and conglomerates of the formation, that due to syn-sedimentary faulting varies greatly in thickness from 300 to 800 metres (980 to 2,620 ft), were deposited in fluvial, deltaic and lacustrine environments.

The formation was deposited in the Galve Sub-basin of the Maestrazgo Basin in central-eastern Spain. During deposition, Iberia was an island, separated by seas from North Africa and France. Underlying the Camarillas Formation is the also highly fossiliferous El Castellar Formation and the Artoles Formation rests on top of the formation.

The Camarillas Formation has provided a rich fossil assemblage of fossils of mammals, snakes, turtles, crocodylians, fish, dinosaurs and their eggs. Various tracksites of families of dinosaurs exist in the formation.

Dinosaur remains have been recovered from the formation.

== Description ==
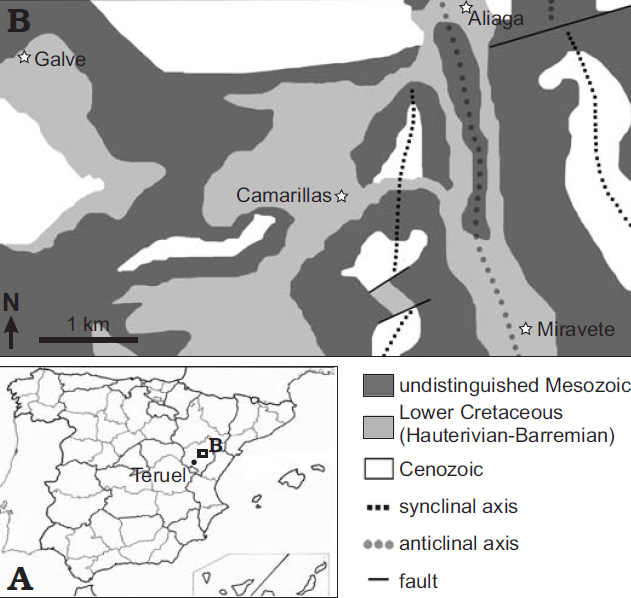
Geographic and geological setting of the Camarillas area

The Camarillas Formation was first formally defined by Canérot et al. in 1982 and later redefined by Salas (1987).

Both Camarillas and Galve are in the Galve Sub-basin, a section of the Aliaga Basin, in the Iberian Range. All these basins were formed during the Permian–Triassic, when the main faults were active, and they are filled with Mesozoic–Quaternary sediments.

The Upper Permian to Upper Jurassic deposits at the site of the Camarillas Formation are all of continental origin. In a second extensional stage during the Late Jurassic to Early Cretaceous, the Atlantic and the Bay of Biscay opened, and the Iberian Peninsula rotated from left to right. At this time, the sediments were marine or showed the influence of the sea, as shown in the deposits of the Higuerueles and Villar del Arzobispo Formations in the Galve Sub-basin. Finally, during the Early Cretaceous and Oligocene–Miocene there were compressive phases with tectonic inversion and formation of continental basins.

Camarillas Formation, in beds of similar age to the La Maca outcrop in the Galve area where the remains of an iguanodontid dinosaur have been found. The Camarillas fossil site is in light brown clay and limestone rocks with fossil wood remains. The sedimentology is similar to that described in the Galve area, because the Camarillas Formation shows scarcely any lateral variations in facies within the Galve Sub-basin.

The Camarillas Formation sandstone is fluviatile, and four groups of paleochannels are distinguished, the first towards the bottom of the succession. These channels become thinner towards the top, and this was interpreted by Díaz and Yébenes (1987) as evidence that there was an alluvial fan with a multichannel system. The lithology of the deposits which fill these channels and their geometry are typical of low-sinuosity channels. Towards the top of the Camarillas Formation, there is a predominance of deltaic fan deposits with marked marine influence. Nevertheless, Soria (1997) mentioned that she found no facies association whose evolution and geometry suggested a well developed deltaic system.

The formation spreads across the Camarillas graben and the Remenderuelas half-graben.

== Fossil content ==
The Camarillas Formation has provided a rich fossil assemblage comprising dinosaurs, crocodiles, snakes, turtles, fish and mammals. Several new species were described from the formation, among others the mammals Galveodon nannothus, Eobaatar hispanicus, Crusafontia cuencana, Lavocatia alfambrensis and Parendotherium herreroi, the turtle Galvechelone lopezmartinezae and the crocodyliform Bernissartia fagesii. Dinosaurs described include 'Iguanodon' galvensis, Gideonmantellia amosanjuanae and Camarillasaurus cirugedae.

The following fossils are reported from the formation:

Fuente Arnar outcrop

- near Camarillas village, Teruel Province, Aragón, NE Spain
- Type horizon
  - Light brown clay and limestone beds, in which fossil wood remains are common, of the Camarillas Formation, lower Barremian, Lower Cretaceous
- Dinosaurs
  - Camarillasaurus cirugedae

Eggs

- Guegoolithus turolensis

Cerrada Roya mine

- Mammals
  - Galveodon nannothus
  - Eobaatar hispanicus
  - Parendotherium herreroi
- Turtles
  - Galvechelone lopezmartinezae
- Crocodyliforms
  - Bernissartia fagesii
  - Theriosuchus sp.
- Snakes
  - Meyasaurus sp.
  - Paramacellodus sp.
- Dinosaurs
  - ?Valdosaurus sp.
  - Spinosaurinae indet.
  - Camarasauridae indet.
  - Nodosauridae indet.
- Pterosaurs
  - Istiodactylidae indet.
  - Ornithocheiridae indet.
  - Pterodactyloidea indet.
- Fish
  - Polyacrodus parvidens
  - Lonchidion microselachos
  - Rhinobatos sp.

San Cristóbal 1

- 'Iguanodon' galvensis
- Dacentrurus sp.
- Spinosaurinae indet.
- Eusauropoda indet.

Poca

- Mammals
  - Crusafontia cuencana
  - Lavocatia alfambrensis
- Turtles
  - Pleurosternidae indet.
  - Helochelydridae indet.
- Snakes
- Paramacellodidae indet.
- Dinosaurs
  - Eusauropoda indet.
  - Dromaeosauridae indet.
  - Velociraptorinae indet.
  - Baryonychinae indet.
  - Heterodontosauridae indet.
- Fish
  - Polyacrodus parvidens

La Maca 3

- Dinosaurs
  - Delapparentia turolensis
  - Dromaeosauridae indet.
  - ?Allosauroidea indet.
- Other reptiles
  - Testudines indet.
  - Crocodylia indet.
  - Atoposauridae indet.
- Fish
  - Lepidotes sp.
- Invertebrates
  - Unio sp.

Poyales Barranco Hondo

- Dinosaurs
  - Gideonmantellia amosanjuanae
  - Theropoda indet.
- Other reptiles
  - Testudines indet.
  - Mesoeucrocodylia indet.
  - Neosuchia indet.

Partida Poyales

- Reptiles
  - "Pleurocoelus" valdensis
  - Hypsilophodontidae indet.

Pajar Julián Paricio 2

- Sharks
  - Cretolamna sp.
- Dinosaurs
  - Dromaeosauridae indet.
  - Iguanodontidae indet.
  - Oofossils
  - Elongatoolithidae indet.

La Maca

- Elliptio galvensis

== Correlation ==
Early Cretaceous stratigraphy of Iberia
Ma	Age	Paleomap \ Basins	Cantabrian	Olanyà	Cameros	Maestrazgo	Oliete	Galve	Morella	South Iberian	Pre-betic	Lusitanian
100	Cenomanian		La Cabana	Sopeira	Utrillas		Mosquerela					Caranguejeira
100	Cenomanian		Altamira	Sopeira	Utrillas							Caranguejeira
100	Cenomanian		Eguino	Sopeira	Utrillas							Caranguejeira
125	Albian		Ullaga - Balmaseda	Lluçà	Utrillas					Traiguera		Caranguejeira
125	Albian		Monte Grande	Lluçà	Escucha		Escucha			Jijona		Caranguejeira
125	Albian		Itxina - Miono	Lluçà	Escucha		Escucha					Caranguejeira
125	Aptian		Valmaseda - Tellamendi	Lluçà	Ol Gp. - Castrillo	Benassal	Escucha	Benassal				Olhos
125	Aptian		Valmaseda - Tellamendi	Font	En Gp. - Leza	Morella/Oliete	Oliete	Villaroya	Morella	Capas; Rojas		Almargem
125	Aptian		Patrocinio - Ernaga	Senyús	En Gp. - Jubela	Forcall			Morella	Villaroya	Upper; Bedoulian	Figueira
125	Barremian		Vega de Pas	Cabó	Abejar	Xert	Alacón	Xert	Morella	Huérguina	Upper; Bedoulian	Assises
125	Barremian		Vega de Pas	Prada	Abejar	Artoles			Morella	Collado	Moutonianum	Papo Seco
125	Barremian		Vega de Pas	Rúbies	Tera Gp. - Golmayo	Alacón/Blesa	Blesa	Camarillas	Mirambel	Collado	Moutonianum	Papo Seco
150	Hauterivian		Vega de Pas	Rúbies	Ur Gp. - Pinilla	Llacova	Blesa	Castellar	Tera Gp. - Pinilla	Villares		Porto da Calada
150	Hauterivian		Vega de Pas	Rúbies	Ur Gp. - Pinilla	Llacova	hiatus	Castellar		Villares		Porto da Calada
150	Hauterivian		Vega de Pas	Rúbies	Ur Gp. - Pinilla	Huerva	hiatus	Castellar	Gaita			Porto da Calada
150	Valanginian		Villaro	Rúbies	Ur Gp. - Larriba	Huerva	hiatus	Castellar	Ped Gp. - Hortigüela			Porto da Calada
150	Valanginian		Villaro	Rúbies	Ped Gp. - Hortigüela	Huerva	hiatus	Castellar	Ped Gp. - Piedrahita			Porto da Calada
150	Valanginian		Villaro	Rúbies	Peñacoba	Huerva	hiatus	Galve	Ped Gp. - Piedrahita	Miravetes		Porto da Calada
150	Berriasian		Cab Gp. - Arcera	Rúbies	Valdeprado	hiatus	hiatus	Alfambra	Ped Gp. - Piedrahita	Miravetes		Porto da Calada
150	Berriasian		Cab Gp. - Arcera		TdL Gp. - Rupelo	hiatus	hiatus	Arzobispo	hiatus	Tollo		Porto da Calada
150	Berriasian		Cab Gp. - Arcera		On Gp. - Huérteles; Sierra Matute	hiatus	hiatus	Arzobispo	hiatus	Tollo		Porto da Calada
150	Tithonian		Lastres		Tera Gp. - Magaña	hiatus	Higuereles		hiatus	Tera Gp. - Magaña		Lourinhã
150	Tithonian		Lastres		Tera Gp. - Magaña	hiatus	Higuereles		Arzobispo	Tera Gp. - Magaña		Lourinhã
150	Tithonian		Lastres		Ágreda	hiatus	Higuereles		Arzobispo	Tera Gp. - Magaña		Lourinhã
Legend		Major fossiliferous, oofossiliferous, ichnofossiliferous, coproliferous, minor formation										

== Gallery ==
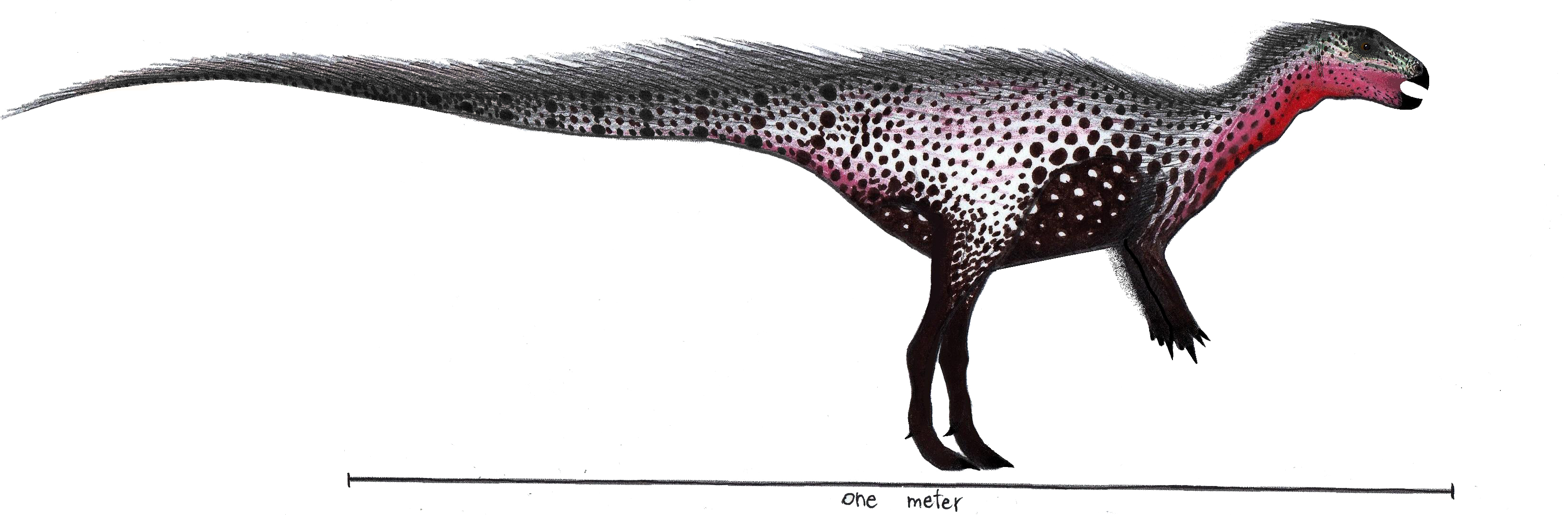
Gideonmantellia

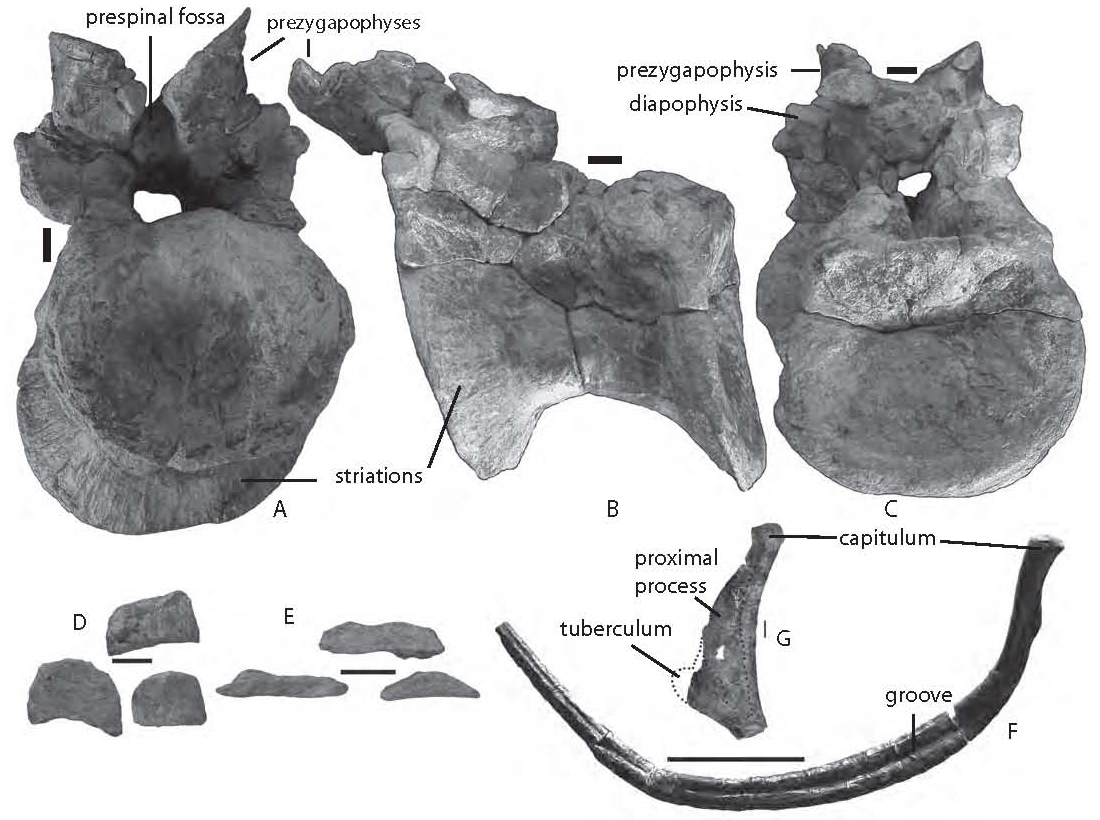
Camarillasaurus

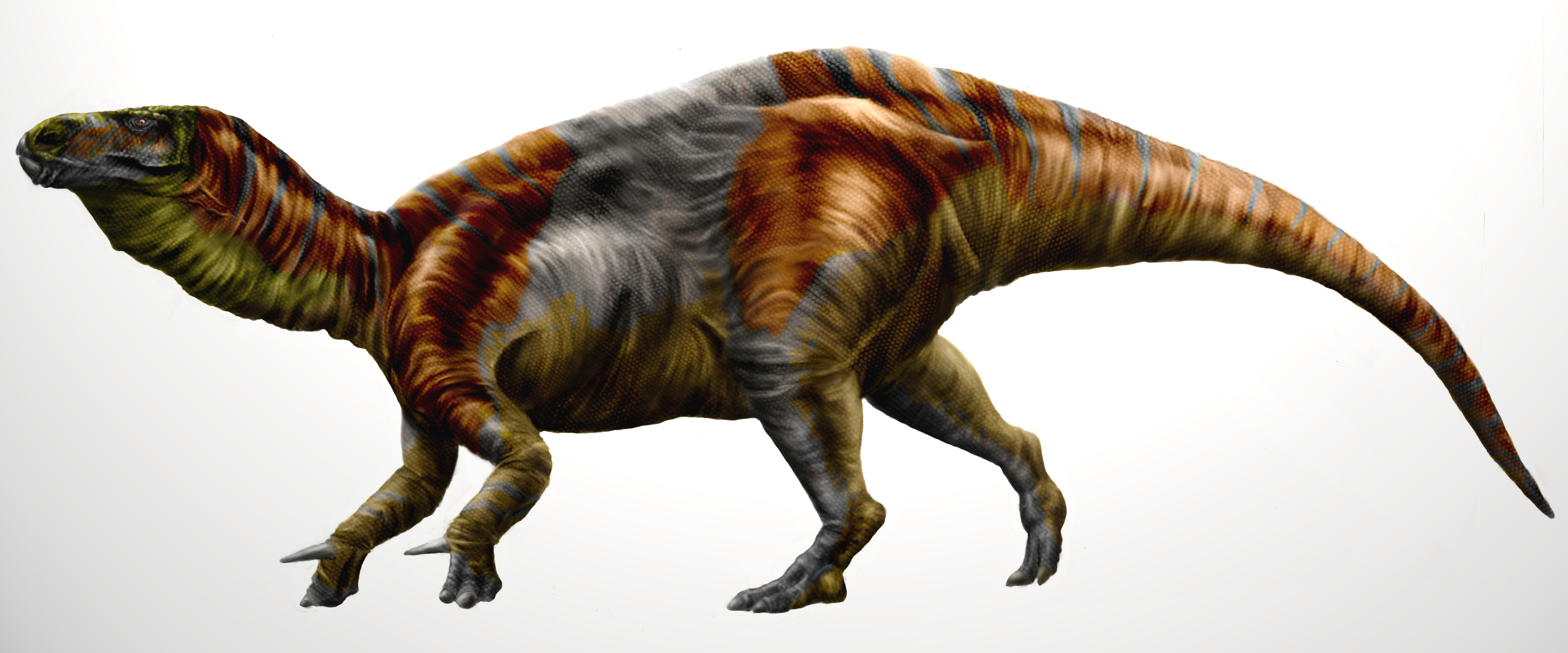
Delapparentia

== See also ==
- List of dinosaur-bearing rock formations
- Tremp Formation
- Escucha Formation
- La Huérguina Formation
- Villar del Arzobispo Formation
