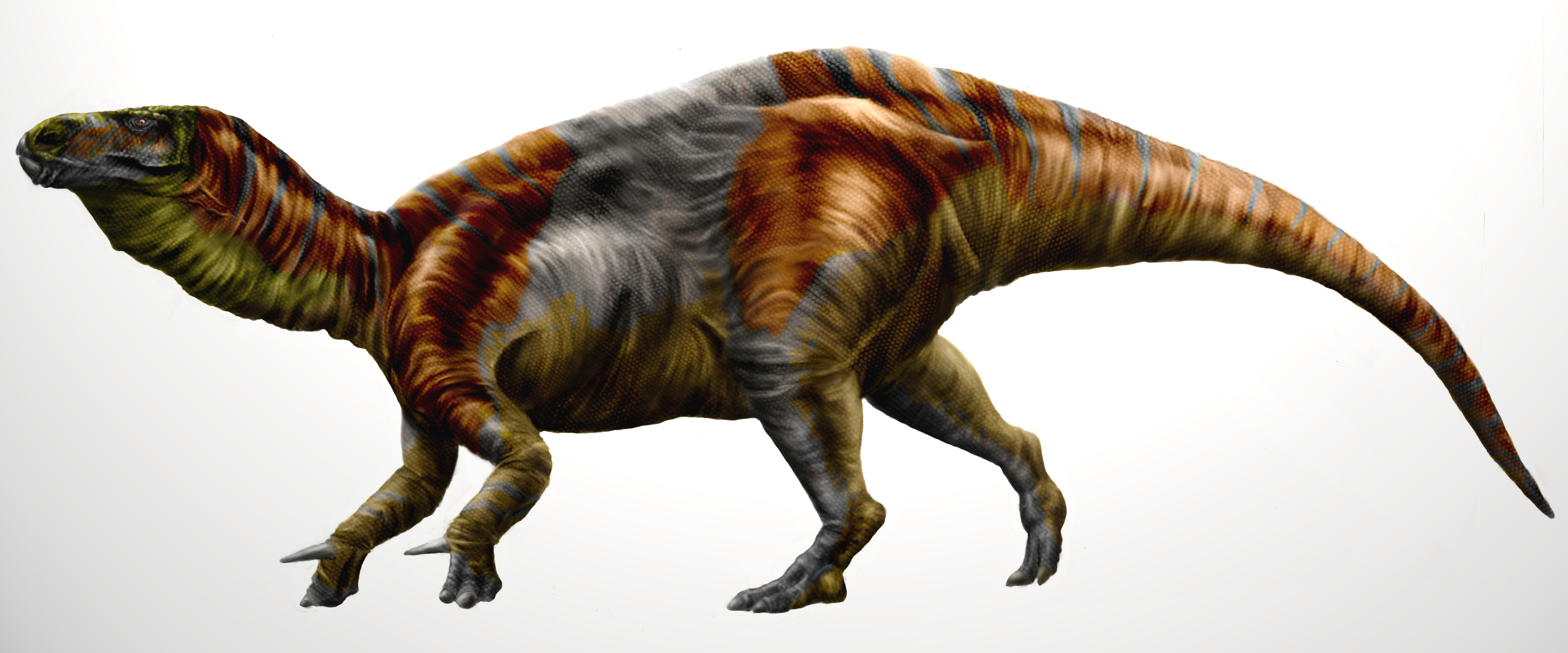
- Restoration

Scientific classification
- Kingdom: Animalia
- Phylum: Chordata
- Class: Reptilia
- Clade: Dinosauria
- Clade: †Ornithischia
- Clade: †Ornithopoda
- Clade: †Hadrosauriformes
- Genus: †Delapparentia; Ruiz-Omeñaca, 2011

Type species
- †Delapparentia turolensis Ruiz-Omeñaca, 2011

= Delapparentia =

Delapparentia Temporal range: 130–127 Ma

Extinct genus of dinosaurs

Delapparentia is a genus of iguanodont dinosaur from the Early Cretaceous period of Galve, Teruel Province, Spain.

== Discovery and naming ==
The type specimen, MPT/I.G, was found in the spring of 1958 by amateur palaeontologist José María Herrero Marzo. Starting from 25 September 1958, it was collected by Professor Dimas Femández-Galiano, assisted by a Dutch team from the University of Utrecht led by Gustav Heinrich Ralph von Koenigswald. The finds were originally assigned to Iguanodon bernissartensis by Albert-Félix de Lapparent in 1960.

It was discovered and collected from La Maca 3 locality in the Camarillas Formation of Galve dating to the early Barremian stage (about 130-127 million years ago), and consists of a partial skeleton lacking the skull, of an adult individual. It consists of four cervical vertebrae, twenty-eight neurapophyses, two sacral vertebrae, fourteen caudal vertebrae, fragments of cervical, dorsal and sternal ribs, fragments of five chevrons, numerous ossified tendons and a left pubis and ilium. Some other bones, misidentified by de Lapparent as those of the sauropod Aragosaurus, were later referred to Delapparentia, among them an ischium.

In 2006, José Ignacio Ruiz-Omeñaca named this material as a new taxon, Delapparentia turolensis, in a dissertation; since names published in theses are invalid nomina ex dissertatione, he subsequently validly named it in a 2011 paper. The generic name honours de Lapparent, while the specific name is derived from the Latin name of Teruel, Turia.

== Description ==
Delapparentia was a large species, about 15% longer than Iguanodon bernissartensis. The length has been estimated at 10 metres (33 ft), the weight at 3.5 tonnes (3.9 tons). The ilium is 78 centimetres (31 in) long. In the initial description of the genus by Ruiz-Omeñaca, several autapomorphies (unique characteristics) of Delapparentia were established: posterior dorsal ribs with long, parallel and unfused capitula and tubercula, ossified sternal ribs, and a straight and lateromedially expanded preacetabular process of the ilium. It also presents a unique combination of characters, including anterior dorsal ribs with a pneumatic foramen and an ischium that is large in relation to the ilium. On the basis of new remains, Gasca et al. provided a revised diagnosis in which they recognized the proportionally high neural spines, and related it to the earlier Barilium from England on the basis of its ilium morphology.

== Classification ==
Delapparentia was assigned to the Iguanodontoidea by Ruiz-Omeñaca in 2011. The identification of Delapparentia as a distinct taxon has been challenged; Verdú et al. conducted a study of individual variation among specimens of Iguanodon bernissartensis, and found that the neural spine proportions of Delapparentia were not particularly outside the range of variation in I. bernissartensis. They considered Delapparentia to represent an old adult individual of I. bernissartensis. However, a 2026 study found it to be distinct, and more closely related to Magnamanus and "Iguanodon" galvensis, the latter of which they suggested that a new genus name would be required.
