= Villar del Arzobispo Formation =

Geologic formation in Aragón, Spain

- Stratigraphic range: Kimmeridgian-early Berriasian?
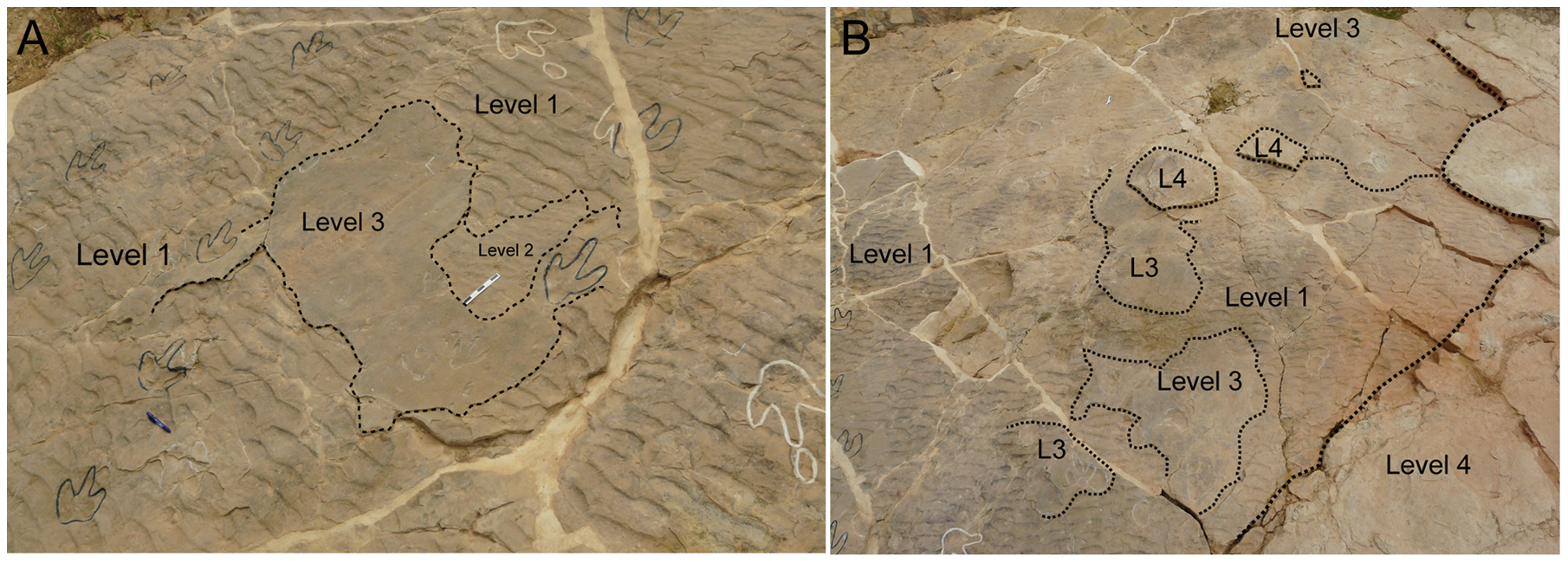
- An ornithopod trackway at the Las Cerradicas site, Villar del Arzobispo Formation. Photographed around 2013.
- Type: Geological formation
- Underlies: Aguilar del Alfambra Formation
- Overlies: Oolitic limestones of the Higuerueles Formation
- Thickness: Greatly variable;108–1,383 m (354–4,537 ft)

Lithology
- Primary: Mudstone
- Other: Limestone, sandstone, conglomerate

Location
- Coordinates: 40.5°N 0.8°W
- Approximate paleocoordinates: 31.4°N 8.6°E
- Region: Aragón, Teruel, Valencia
- Country: Spain
- Extent: Maestrazgo Basin

Type section
- Named for: Villar del Arzobispo
- Villar del Arzobispo Formation (Spain)

The Villar del Arzobispo Formation is a Late Jurassic to possibly Early Cretaceous geologic formation in eastern Spain. It is equivalent in age to the Lourinhã Formation of Portugal. It was originally thought to date from the Late Tithonian-Middle Berriasian, but more recent work suggests a Kimmeridigan-Late Tithonian, possibly dating to the Early Berriasian in some areas. The Villar del Arzobispo Formation's age in the area of Riodeva in Spain has been dated based on stratigraphic correlations as middle-upper Tithonian, approximately 145-141 million years old. In the area of Galve, the formation potentially dates into the earliest Cretaceous. Isotope dating gives the formation a Late Kimmeridgian date of 152.5-151 million years old. This unit includes, at its uppermost part, the essentially siliciclastic deposits previously assigned to the El Collado Fm, a unit traditionally assigned to the Barremian and recently dated as Kimmeridgian-Tithonian.

Most of the unit consists of siliciclastic mudstone, however the lower portion of the formation is dominated by bioclastic, oolitic and peloidal limestone, while channelized sandstone and conglomerate is found in the middle portion of the unit. While the lower part of the formation was deposited in an inner carbonate platform, the upward gradation into mudstone in the middle and upper portions of the formation represents a change in depositional environment to paralic and alluvial plain conditions.

Provenance studies indicate that the source areas of the sediments of this formation were mostly peraluminic granites that probably came the erosion of the Central Iberian Zone (Iberian Massif), located more than 200 km away from the depositional areas.

Dinosaur remains are found throughout the unit, but are more abundant and better preserved in the terrestrially deposited middle-upper sections. Remains of the stegosaurid Dacentrurus were recovered in the Barranco Conejero locality in this formation. Over the years, other stegosaurian remains have been discovered in this formation, but none have yet been referred to a specific genus. Turiasaurs and brachiosaurids are also known from the formation. The formation is also well known for its fossil footprints, representing many different taxa.

== Fossil content ==
=== Dinosaurs ===
==== Ornithischians ====
===== Ornithopods =====
Color key: Taxon / Reclassified taxon / Taxon falsely reported as present / Dubious taxon or junior synonym / Ichnotaxon / Ootaxon / Morphotaxon Notes Uncertain or tentative taxa are in small text ~~crossed out~~ taxa are discredited.
Ornithischians of the Villar del Arzobispo Formation
Taxon	Species	Localities	Material	Notes	Images
Ankylopollexia	Indeterminate	By Pass fossil site (Alpuente, Valencia)	a left dentary tooth, an anterior caudal vertebra, a posterior caudal vertebra	A small-sized ankylopollexian	
Ankylopollexia	Indeterminate	VS-1 site (Veguillas de la Sierra, Teruel)	an anterior caudal vertebra	A large-sized ankylopollexian	
aff. Camptosaurus	C. sp.	Fuentecillas	fragmentary remains: an anterior cervical centrum; an anterior dorsal centrum; a dorsosacral centrum; four sacral centra; a caudosacral centrum; two anterior caudal centra; three medial caudal centra; and a distal fragment from the left humerus	An ornithopod. The Fuentecillas specimen is seen to be closer to Camptosaurus than to Draconyx, hence its tentative placement within the Camptosaurus genus.	Camptosaurus Oblitosaurus
Dryosauridae	Indeterminate	RD-61 site (Riodeva, Teruel)	an anterior caudal vertebra		Camptosaurus Oblitosaurus
Oblitosaurus	O. bunnueli	Barrihonda-El Humero	"a dentary tooth, an ungual pollex of the manus, and an almost complete left hindlimb"	Basalmost ankylopollexian, sister taxon to Draconyx.	Camptosaurus Oblitosaurus
Ornithopoda	Indeterminate	Cambrillas	a pedal ungual phalanx		Camptosaurus Oblitosaurus
Ornithopoda	Indeterminate	Cerrito del Olmo	a cervical centrum and two caudal vertebrae		Camptosaurus Oblitosaurus

===== Stegosaurs =====
Color key: Taxon / Reclassified taxon / Taxon falsely reported as present / Dubious taxon or junior synonym / Ichnotaxon / Ootaxon / Morphotaxon Notes Uncertain or tentative taxa are in small text ~~crossed out~~ taxa are discredited.
Stegosaurs of the Villar del Arzobispo Formation
Taxon	Species	Localities	Material	Notes	Images
Dacentrurus	D. armatus	Barrihonda–El Humero; San Cristóbal; Cerrito del Olmo	several different elements	Subjective senior synonym of Miragaia.	Dacentrurus
Dacentrurinae	Indeterminate	Barranco del Curro; El Balsón	two partial skeletons	Indeterminate as it cannot be compared with Miragaia, assuming Miragaia is distinct.	Dacentrurus
Deltapodus	D. ibericus	El Castellar	trackway on tidal limestone	Belongs to a large stegosaur, possibly related to Dacentrurus.	Dacentrurus

==== Sauropods ====
Color key: Taxon / Reclassified taxon / Taxon falsely reported as present / Dubious taxon or junior synonym / Ichnotaxon / Ootaxon / Morphotaxon Notes Uncertain or tentative taxa are in small text ~~crossed out~~ taxa are discredited.
Sauropods of the Villar del Arzobispo Formation
Taxon	Species	Localities	Material	Notes	Images
Aragosaurus	A. ischiaticus	Las Zabacheras	partial postcranial skeleton	A basal macronarian previously thought to come from the El Castellar Formation.	Aragosaurus Turiasaurus
Diplodocidae	Indeterminate	Pino de Jarque 2	ilium	Similar to Diplodocus and Barosaurus.	Aragosaurus Turiasaurus
Diplodocinae	Indeterminate	El Carrillejo	anterior caudal vertebra		Aragosaurus Turiasaurus
Diplodocus	D. sp.	El Castellar	14 caudal vertebrae and several chevrons	Specimen estimated at 25 metres (82 ft) in length.	Aragosaurus Turiasaurus
Galvesaurus	G. herreroi	Cuesta Lonsal-1	partial skeleton	Was once thought to be a turiasaur or basal macronarian, but now known to be a brachiosaurid. Possibly a junior synonym of Lusotitan.	Aragosaurus Turiasaurus
Losillasaurus	L. giganteus	La Cañada; San Lorenzo	caudal vertebrae, and two partial skeletons	A large turiasaur closely related to Turiasaurus.	Aragosaurus Turiasaurus
Macronaria	Indeterminate	La Quineta 1; Las Viñas; San Lorenzo	caudal vertebrae		Aragosaurus Turiasaurus
Turiasaurus	T. riodevensis	Barrihonda–El Humero; Corral de la Cautiva	several postcranial and cranial elements	A large turiasaur, similar to Losillasaurus.	Aragosaurus Turiasaurus
Turiasauria	Indeterminate	Puntal de Santa Cruz	several postcranial elements	Indeterminate turiasaur material originally referred to Turiasaurus, but does not share any unique features with the genus	Aragosaurus Turiasaurus
Brachiosauridae indet.	Indeterminate	Los Ganchos	Postcranial elements	A large indeterminate brachiosaur.	Aragosaurus Turiasaurus

==== Theropods ====
Color key: Taxon / Reclassified taxon / Taxon falsely reported as present / Dubious taxon or junior synonym / Ichnotaxon / Ootaxon / Morphotaxon Notes Uncertain or tentative taxa are in small text ~~crossed out~~ taxa are discredited.
Theropods of the Villar del Arzobispo Formation
Taxon	Species	Localities	Material	Notes	Images
Allosauridae	Indeterminate	Barrihonda-El Humero	5 teeth	Typical allosaurid teeth.	
Dromaeosauridae	Indeterminate	Barrihonda-El Humero; Puntal de Santa Cruz	7 teeth	Possibly belonging to a velociraptorine.	
Iberosauripus	I. grandis	El Castellar	trackway	Likely belonged to a megalosaurid.	
Megalosauridae	Indeterminate	Carretera; La Fonseca; Masía de la Hoya Alta; RD-39	teeth	Tentatively referred to the Megalosauridae. Some of the largest theropod teeth of Spain.	

=== Reptiles ===
Miscellaneous Reptiles of the Villar del Arzobispo Formation
Taxon	Species	Localities	Material	Notes	Images
Riodevemys	R. inumbragigas	Barrihonda–El Humero		A pleurosternid freshwater turtle	
Crocodylomorpha indet.	Indeterminate	El Cantalar	Prints	Footprints of an enormous Crocodylomorph. Estimated at 12 meters in length,possibly represents Machimosaurus but the taxonomic attribution is not certain.	

== Correlation ==
Early Cretaceous stratigraphy of Iberia
Ma	Age	Paleomap \ Basins	Cantabrian	Olanyà	Cameros	Maestrazgo	Oliete	Galve	Morella	South Iberian	Pre-betic	Lusitanian
100	Cenomanian		La Cabana	Sopeira	Utrillas		Mosquerela					Caranguejeira
100	Cenomanian		Altamira	Sopeira	Utrillas							Caranguejeira
100	Cenomanian		Eguino	Sopeira	Utrillas							Caranguejeira
125	Albian		Ullaga - Balmaseda	Lluçà	Utrillas					Traiguera		Caranguejeira
125	Albian		Monte Grande	Lluçà	Escucha		Escucha			Jijona		Caranguejeira
125	Albian		Itxina - Miono	Lluçà	Escucha		Escucha					Caranguejeira
125	Aptian		Valmaseda - Tellamendi	Lluçà	Ol Gp. - Castrillo	Benassal	Escucha	Benassal				Olhos
125	Aptian		Valmaseda - Tellamendi	Font	En Gp. - Leza	Morella/Oliete	Oliete	Villaroya	Morella	Capas; Rojas		Almargem
125	Aptian		Patrocinio - Ernaga	Senyús	En Gp. - Jubela	Forcall			Morella	Villaroya	Upper; Bedoulian	Figueira
125	Barremian		Vega de Pas	Cabó	Abejar	Xert	Alacón	Xert	Morella	Huérguina	Upper; Bedoulian	Assises
125	Barremian		Vega de Pas	Prada	Abejar	Artoles			Morella	Collado	Moutonianum	Papo Seco
125	Barremian		Vega de Pas	Rúbies	Tera Gp. - Golmayo	Alacón/Blesa	Blesa	Camarillas	Mirambel	Collado	Moutonianum	Papo Seco
150	Hauterivian		Vega de Pas	Rúbies	Ur Gp. - Pinilla	Llacova	Blesa	Castellar	Tera Gp. - Pinilla	Villares		Porto da Calada
150	Hauterivian		Vega de Pas	Rúbies	Ur Gp. - Pinilla	Llacova	hiatus	Castellar		Villares		Porto da Calada
150	Hauterivian		Vega de Pas	Rúbies	Ur Gp. - Pinilla	Huerva	hiatus	Castellar	Gaita			Porto da Calada
150	Valanginian		Villaro	Rúbies	Ur Gp. - Larriba	Huerva	hiatus	Castellar	Ped Gp. - Hortigüela			Porto da Calada
150	Valanginian		Villaro	Rúbies	Ped Gp. - Hortigüela	Huerva	hiatus	Castellar	Ped Gp. - Piedrahita			Porto da Calada
150	Valanginian		Villaro	Rúbies	Peñacoba	Huerva	hiatus	Galve	Ped Gp. - Piedrahita	Miravetes		Porto da Calada
150	Berriasian		Cab Gp. - Arcera	Rúbies	Valdeprado	hiatus	hiatus	Alfambra	Ped Gp. - Piedrahita	Miravetes		Porto da Calada
150	Berriasian		Cab Gp. - Arcera		TdL Gp. - Rupelo	hiatus	hiatus	Arzobispo	hiatus	Tollo		Porto da Calada
150	Berriasian		Cab Gp. - Arcera		On Gp. - Huérteles; Sierra Matute	hiatus	hiatus	Arzobispo	hiatus	Tollo		Porto da Calada
150	Tithonian		Lastres		Tera Gp. - Magaña	hiatus	Higuereles		hiatus	Tera Gp. - Magaña		Lourinhã
150	Tithonian		Lastres		Tera Gp. - Magaña	hiatus	Higuereles		Arzobispo	Tera Gp. - Magaña		Lourinhã
150	Tithonian		Lastres		Ágreda	hiatus	Higuereles		Arzobispo	Tera Gp. - Magaña		Lourinhã
Legend		Major fossiliferous, oofossiliferous, ichnofossiliferous, coproliferous, minor formation										

== See also ==
- List of dinosaur-bearing rock formations
  - List of stratigraphic units with few dinosaur genera
