= Castrillo de la Reina Formation =

Geological formation in Spain

- Stratigraphic range: late Barremian-early Aptian; ~125 Ma
- Type: Geological formation
- Unit of: Oliván Group
- Underlies: Utrillas & Escucha Formations
- Overlies: Hortigüela & Leza Formations

Lithology
- Primary: Claystone
- Other: Sandstone

Location
- Coordinates: 42.0°N 3.3°W
- Approximate paleocoordinates: 32.6°N 8.2°E
- Region: Castile and León
- Country: Spain
- Extent: Cameros Basin
- Castrillo de la Reina Formation (Spain)

The Castrillo de la Reina Formation is a geological formation in Spain. It is late Barremian to early Aptian in age. It interpreted as a fluvial deposit. It primarily consists of red clay, with ribbon shaped sandstone channel fills.

== Fossil content ==
Color key: Taxon / Reclassified taxon / Taxon falsely reported as present / Dubious taxon or junior synonym / Ichnotaxon / Ootaxon / Morphotaxon	Notes; Uncertain or tentative taxa are in small text; ~~crossed out~~ taxa are discredited.

=== Dinosaurs ===
==== Ornithiscians ====
Ornithopods of the Castrillo de la Reina Formation
Genus	Species	Locality	Stratigraphic unit	Material	Description	Images
Foskeia	F. pelendonum	Vegagete	Lower	A disarticulated and fragmentary postcranial remains	A rhabdodontomorph ornithopod, formerly named 'Vegagete ornithopod'	Foskeia
Hadrosauriformes indet.	Indeterminate	Los Terreros-Altollano I site		Incomplete skull materials	Basal hadrosauriform, derived than Iguanodontidae	

==== Sauropods ====
Sauropods of the Castrillo de la Reina Formation
Genus	Species	Locality	Stratigraphic unit	Material	Description	Images
Demandasaurus	D. darwini	Tenandas de Los Vallejos II and Salas de los Infantes Quarry	Lower	An incomplete but associated skeleton that includes cranial and postcranial remains	A rebbachisaurid	Demandasaurus Europatitan
Europatitan	E. eastwoodi	El Oterillo II	Lower	A holotype specimen consists of five cervical vertebrae, one dorsal vertebra, nine caudal vertebrae, 11 cervical ribs, five dorsal ribs, seven chevrons, both scapulae, the left coracoid, two left metacarpals, both pubis bones, both iscia, and a single tooth	A somphospondylan sauropod	Demandasaurus Europatitan

=== Other reptiles ===
Other reptiles of the Castrillo de la Reina Formation
Genus	Species	Locality	Stratigraphic unit	Material	Description	Images
Arcanosaurus	A. ibericus	Viajete	Lower	A 29 mid-dorsal vertebra	A varanoid lizard	

== Correlation ==
Early Cretaceous stratigraphy of Iberia
Ma	Age	Paleomap \ Basins	Cantabrian	Olanyà	Cameros	Maestrazgo	Oliete	Galve	Morella	South Iberian	Pre-betic	Lusitanian
100	Cenomanian		La Cabana	Sopeira	Utrillas		Mosquerela					Caranguejeira
100	Cenomanian		Altamira	Sopeira	Utrillas							Caranguejeira
100	Cenomanian		Eguino	Sopeira	Utrillas							Caranguejeira
125	Albian		Ullaga - Balmaseda	Lluçà	Utrillas					Traiguera		Caranguejeira
125	Albian		Monte Grande	Lluçà	Escucha		Escucha			Jijona		Caranguejeira
125	Albian		Itxina - Miono	Lluçà	Escucha		Escucha					Caranguejeira
125	Aptian		Valmaseda - Tellamendi	Lluçà	Ol Gp. - Castrillo	Benassal	Escucha	Benassal				Olhos
125	Aptian		Valmaseda - Tellamendi	Font	En Gp. - Leza	Morella/Oliete	Oliete	Villaroya	Morella	Capas; Rojas		Almargem
125	Aptian		Patrocinio - Ernaga	Senyús	En Gp. - Jubela	Forcall			Morella	Villaroya	Upper; Bedoulian	Figueira
125	Barremian		Vega de Pas	Cabó	Abejar	Xert	Alacón	Xert	Morella	Huérguina	Upper; Bedoulian	Assises
125	Barremian		Vega de Pas	Prada	Abejar	Artoles			Morella	Collado	Moutonianum	Papo Seco
125	Barremian		Vega de Pas	Rúbies	Tera Gp. - Golmayo	Alacón/Blesa	Blesa	Camarillas	Mirambel	Collado	Moutonianum	Papo Seco
150	Hauterivian		Vega de Pas	Rúbies	Ur Gp. - Pinilla	Llacova	Blesa	Castellar	Tera Gp. - Pinilla	Villares		Porto da Calada
150	Hauterivian		Vega de Pas	Rúbies	Ur Gp. - Pinilla	Llacova	hiatus	Castellar		Villares		Porto da Calada
150	Hauterivian		Vega de Pas	Rúbies	Ur Gp. - Pinilla	Huerva	hiatus	Castellar	Gaita			Porto da Calada
150	Valanginian		Villaro	Rúbies	Ur Gp. - Larriba	Huerva	hiatus	Castellar	Ped Gp. - Hortigüela			Porto da Calada
150	Valanginian		Villaro	Rúbies	Ped Gp. - Hortigüela	Huerva	hiatus	Castellar	Ped Gp. - Piedrahita			Porto da Calada
150	Valanginian		Villaro	Rúbies	Peñacoba	Huerva	hiatus	Galve	Ped Gp. - Piedrahita	Miravetes		Porto da Calada
150	Berriasian		Cab Gp. - Arcera	Rúbies	Valdeprado	hiatus	hiatus	Alfambra	Ped Gp. - Piedrahita	Miravetes		Porto da Calada
150	Berriasian		Cab Gp. - Arcera		TdL Gp. - Rupelo	hiatus	hiatus	Arzobispo	hiatus	Tollo		Porto da Calada
150	Berriasian		Cab Gp. - Arcera		On Gp. - Huérteles; Sierra Matute	hiatus	hiatus	Arzobispo	hiatus	Tollo		Porto da Calada
150	Tithonian		Lastres		Tera Gp. - Magaña	hiatus	Higuereles		hiatus	Tera Gp. - Magaña		Lourinhã
150	Tithonian		Lastres		Tera Gp. - Magaña	hiatus	Higuereles		Arzobispo	Tera Gp. - Magaña		Lourinhã
150	Tithonian		Lastres		Ágreda	hiatus	Higuereles		Arzobispo	Tera Gp. - Magaña		Lourinhã
Legend		Major fossiliferous, oofossiliferous, ichnofossiliferous, coproliferous, minor formation										
