= El Castellar Formation =

Geological formation in Spain

- Stratigraphic range: Valanginian-Barremian; ~135–125 Ma
- Type: Geological formation
- Sub-units: Lower and Upper Members
- Underlies: Camarillas Formation
- Overlies: Galve Formation
- Thickness: 85–140 m (279–459 ft)

Lithology
- Primary: Claystone, sandstone
- Other: Marl, conglomerate

Location
- Coordinates: 40.7°N 0.9°W
- Approximate paleocoordinates: 31.1°N 8.8°E
- Region: Aragón, Teruel
- Country: Spain
- El Castellar Formation (Spain)

The El Castellar Formation is a geological formation in La Rioja and Teruel, Spain whose strata date back to the possibly the Valanginian to the Barremian stages of the Early Cretaceous. Dinosaur remains are among the fossils that have been recovered from the formation.

== Vertebrate paleofauna ==
Ornithopod tracks and dinosaur eggs are known from the formation.

=== Amphibians ===
Amphibians
Genus	Species	Location	Stratigraphic position	Abundance	Notes	Images
Eodiscoglossus	E. santonjae				Frog	
Galverpeton	G. ibericum				A member of Caudata.	

=== Dinosaurs ===
Dinosaurs
Genus	Species	Location	Stratigraphic position	Abundance	Notes	Images
cf. Owenodon	Indeterminate					
cf. Paronychodon	Indeterminate				Possible indeterminate troodont remains.	
Styracosterna	Indeterminate				Previously assigned to Mantellisaurus.	

=== Turtles ===
Turtles
Genus	Species	Location	Stratigraphic position	Abundance	Notes	Images
Dortokidae	Indeterminate					

=== Mammals ===
Mammals
Genus	Species	Location	Stratigraphic position	Abundance	Notes	Images
Crusafontia	C. cuencana				Dryolestid	
Iberica	I. hahni				Multituberculate	
Spalacotherium	S. henkeli				Spalacotheriidae	

Color key: Taxon / Reclassified taxon / Taxon falsely reported as present / Dubious taxon or junior synonym / Ichnotaxon / Ootaxon / Morphotaxon	Notes; Uncertain or tentative taxa are in small text; ~~crossed out~~ taxa are discredited.

== Correlation ==
Early Cretaceous stratigraphy of Iberia
Ma	Age	Paleomap \ Basins	Cantabrian	Olanyà	Cameros	Maestrazgo	Oliete	Galve	Morella	South Iberian	Pre-betic	Lusitanian
100	Cenomanian		La Cabana	Sopeira	Utrillas		Mosquerela					Caranguejeira
100	Cenomanian		Altamira	Sopeira	Utrillas							Caranguejeira
100	Cenomanian		Eguino	Sopeira	Utrillas							Caranguejeira
125	Albian		Ullaga - Balmaseda	Lluçà	Utrillas					Traiguera		Caranguejeira
125	Albian		Monte Grande	Lluçà	Escucha		Escucha			Jijona		Caranguejeira
125	Albian		Itxina - Miono	Lluçà	Escucha		Escucha					Caranguejeira
125	Aptian		Valmaseda - Tellamendi	Lluçà	Ol Gp. - Castrillo	Benassal	Escucha	Benassal				Olhos
125	Aptian		Valmaseda - Tellamendi	Font	En Gp. - Leza	Morella/Oliete	Oliete	Villaroya	Morella	Capas; Rojas		Almargem
125	Aptian		Patrocinio - Ernaga	Senyús	En Gp. - Jubela	Forcall			Morella	Villaroya	Upper; Bedoulian	Figueira
125	Barremian		Vega de Pas	Cabó	Abejar	Xert	Alacón	Xert	Morella	Huérguina	Upper; Bedoulian	Assises
125	Barremian		Vega de Pas	Prada	Abejar	Artoles			Morella	Collado	Moutonianum	Papo Seco
125	Barremian		Vega de Pas	Rúbies	Tera Gp. - Golmayo	Alacón/Blesa	Blesa	Camarillas	Mirambel	Collado	Moutonianum	Papo Seco
150	Hauterivian		Vega de Pas	Rúbies	Ur Gp. - Pinilla	Llacova	Blesa	Castellar	Tera Gp. - Pinilla	Villares		Porto da Calada
150	Hauterivian		Vega de Pas	Rúbies	Ur Gp. - Pinilla	Llacova	hiatus	Castellar		Villares		Porto da Calada
150	Hauterivian		Vega de Pas	Rúbies	Ur Gp. - Pinilla	Huerva	hiatus	Castellar	Gaita			Porto da Calada
150	Valanginian		Villaro	Rúbies	Ur Gp. - Larriba	Huerva	hiatus	Castellar	Ped Gp. - Hortigüela			Porto da Calada
150	Valanginian		Villaro	Rúbies	Ped Gp. - Hortigüela	Huerva	hiatus	Castellar	Ped Gp. - Piedrahita			Porto da Calada
150	Valanginian		Villaro	Rúbies	Peñacoba	Huerva	hiatus	Galve	Ped Gp. - Piedrahita	Miravetes		Porto da Calada
150	Berriasian		Cab Gp. - Arcera	Rúbies	Valdeprado	hiatus	hiatus	Alfambra	Ped Gp. - Piedrahita	Miravetes		Porto da Calada
150	Berriasian		Cab Gp. - Arcera		TdL Gp. - Rupelo	hiatus	hiatus	Arzobispo	hiatus	Tollo		Porto da Calada
150	Berriasian		Cab Gp. - Arcera		On Gp. - Huérteles; Sierra Matute	hiatus	hiatus	Arzobispo	hiatus	Tollo		Porto da Calada
150	Tithonian		Lastres		Tera Gp. - Magaña	hiatus	Higuereles		hiatus	Tera Gp. - Magaña		Lourinhã
150	Tithonian		Lastres		Tera Gp. - Magaña	hiatus	Higuereles		Arzobispo	Tera Gp. - Magaña		Lourinhã
150	Tithonian		Lastres		Ágreda	hiatus	Higuereles		Arzobispo	Tera Gp. - Magaña		Lourinhã
Legend		Major fossiliferous, oofossiliferous, ichnofossiliferous, coproliferous, minor formation										

== See also ==
- List of dinosaur-bearing rock formations
