= Camarillas =

- Location within Spain
- Coordinates: 40°37′N 0°45′W
- Country: Spain
- Autonomous community: Aragon
- Province: Teruel
- Municipality: Camarillas

Area
  - Total: 50.55 km^{2} (19.52 sq mi)
- Elevation: 1,314 m (4,311 ft)

Population (2022)
  - Total: 84
  - Density: 1.7/km^{2} (4.3/sq mi)
- Time zone: UTC+1 (CET)
  - Summer (DST): UTC+2 (CEST)

Camarillas is a municipality located in the province of Teruel, Aragon, Spain. According to the 2022 census (INE), the municipality has a population of 84 inhabitants.

== Population ==
Historical population

Year	Pop.	±% p.a.
1999	131	—
2008	121	−0.88%

Year	Pop.	±% p.a.
2019	100	−1.72%

== See also ==
- Camarillas Formation – Geological formation in Aragon, Spain
- List of municipalities in Teruel
