= Galve, Teruel =

Galve, Spain
- Location within Spain
- Coordinates: 40°39′N 0°52′W
- Country: Spain
- Autonomous community: Aragon
- Province: Teruel
- Municipality: Galve

Area
  - Total: 61.90 km^{2} (23.90 sq mi)

Population (2025-01-01)
  - Total: 149
- Time zone: UTC+1 (CET)
  - Summer (DST): UTC+2 (CEST)

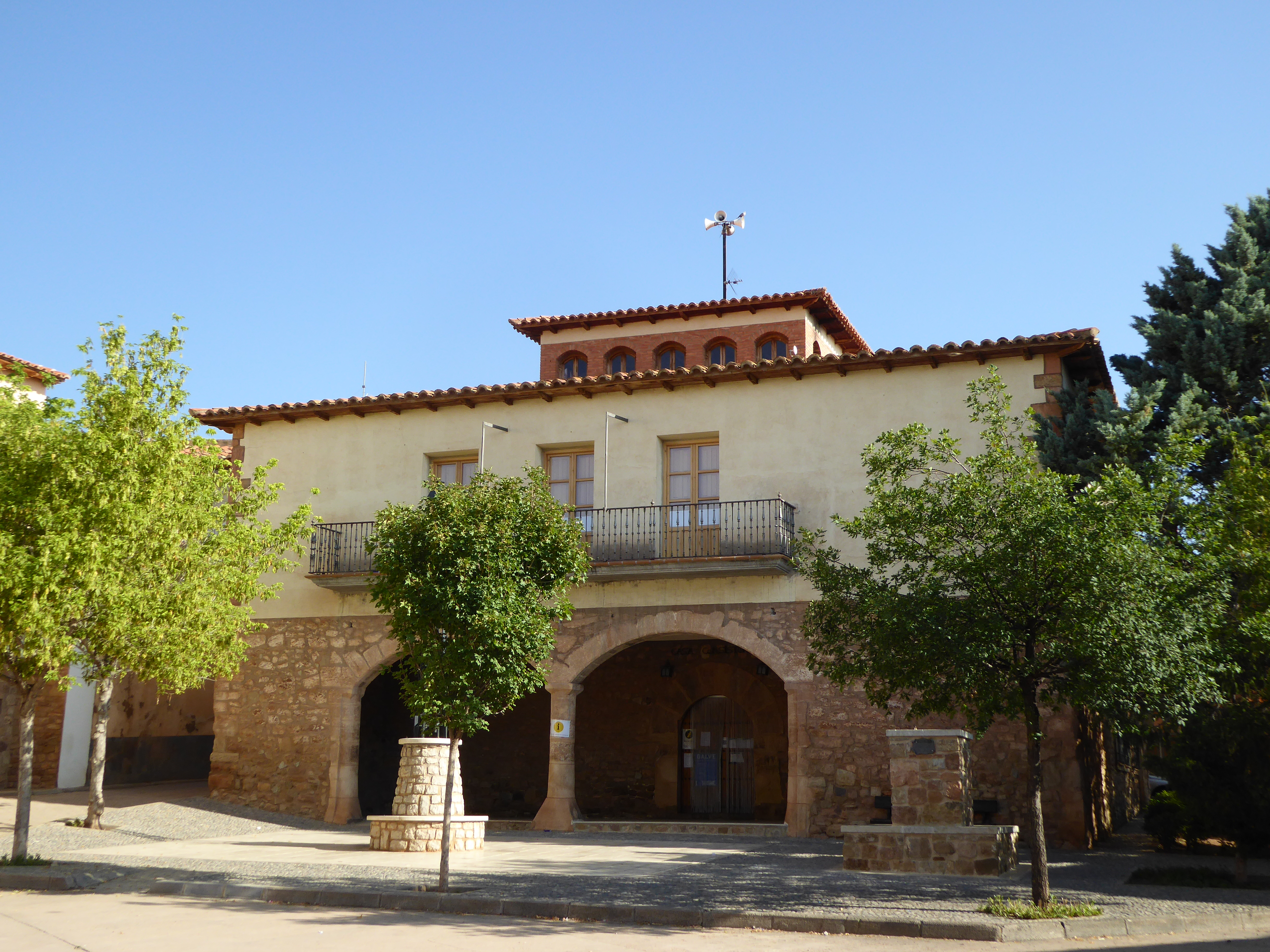

Galve is a municipality located in the province of Teruel, Aragon, Spain. According to the 2006 census (INE), the municipality has a population of 145 inhabitants. There is an important paleontological site.

== Paleontological significance ==
The Galve area is a productive area full of fossil sites well known for its faunal assemblage of dinosaurs, notably the sauropods and mammals. This region is also noted for its lissamphibians, lizards and turtles, as well as diverse multituberculates, dryolestoids, and spalacotheriids.

Spanish paleontologists have worked this site for years, including José Ignacio Canudo, José Luis Barco, Gloria Cuenca-Bescós, and José Ignacio Ruiz-Omeñaca.

The Galve region sediments date back to the Late Jurassic–Early Cretaceous, with five formations ranging in age from Tithonian to Aptian listed below:

- Higueruelas Formation (Tithonian)
- Villar del Arzobispo Formation (upper Tithonian-middle Berriasian)
- El Castellar Formation (upper Hauterivian)
- Camarillas Formation (lower Barremian)
- Artoles Formation (upper Barremian-lower Aptian)

=== Fauna ===
==== Dinosaurs ====
Theropods (spinosaurines), sauropods, and ornithischians have been reported from the Galve region. Fossil teeth belonging to baryonychines, allosauroids, dromaeosaurids and indeterminable coelurosaurs have also been recovered at some of the Galve sites. Those indeterminable coelurosaur teeth are from the Galve outcrops of the El Castellar Formation, and bear some avian resemblance.

==== Sauropods ====
Sauropods from the Galve region include Aragosaurus ischiaticus, Galveosaurus herreroi, and Turiasaurus riodevensis. Isolated remains have also been referred to camarasaurids, brachiosaurids, and diplodocids. Aragosaurus has been identified as a camarasaurid, a titanosaur, and recently, a eusauropod of uncertain affinities. Galveosaurus was originally described as a cetiosaurid but later argued to be a basal macronarian, and Turiasaurus was argued by its describers to represent a new clade close to neosauropod ancestry, Turiasauria. A new study also concluded that Galveosaurus was a turiasaur, and not a cetiosaurid or macronarian.

Galveosaurus was published in 2005 by Barbara, naming it Galveosaurus herreroi, in the journal Zootaxa. Late that same year, a team led by José Luis Barco published a less formal article in the magazine Naturaleza Aragonesa (Barco et al. 2005), and here they named the same taxon Galvesaurus herreroi(a difference of one letter).

A Camarasaurus-like taxon is represented only by teeth from the El Castellar Formation. These teeth bear a strong resemblance to the teeth of Camarasaurus than the teeth of any other sauropod. However, their younger age (Hauterivian-Barremian) makes them substantially younger than Camarasaurus, and hence likely to belong to a separate taxon.

===== Heterodontosaurids =====
Heterodontosaurids have also been attributed to the Galve region. Heterodontosaurids are a mostly Early Jurassic clade, best known from southern Africa.

==== Crocodilians ====
Numerous crocodilians have been found in Galve. One particularly notable find is an outcrop of the Villar del Arzobispo Formation at El Cantalar that preserves a trackway produced by a crocodyliform that measures approximately 12 meters in length, comparable in size to Deinosuchus, Sarcosuchus, and the unique Stomatosuchus. Furthermore, teeth, osteoderms, and bones belonging to atoposaurids, Bernissartia, and possibly pholidosaurids and teleosaurids are all known from the Galve region, illustrating the amount of crocodilian material preserved at the site.

==== Pterosaurs ====
Pterosaur teeth have also been uncovered in the Galve region, although more substantial remains are rare. However, there are enough remains at the sites to determine that the Galve region hosted a wide variety of pterosaurs at one point. Pterosaurs that have been discovered at this site include ornithocheirids, dsungaripterids, possible gnathosaurines, and istiodactylids.

== See also ==
- List of municipalities in Teruel
