= Urbión Group =

- Stratigraphic range: Late Hauterivian-late Barremian; ~130–121 Ma
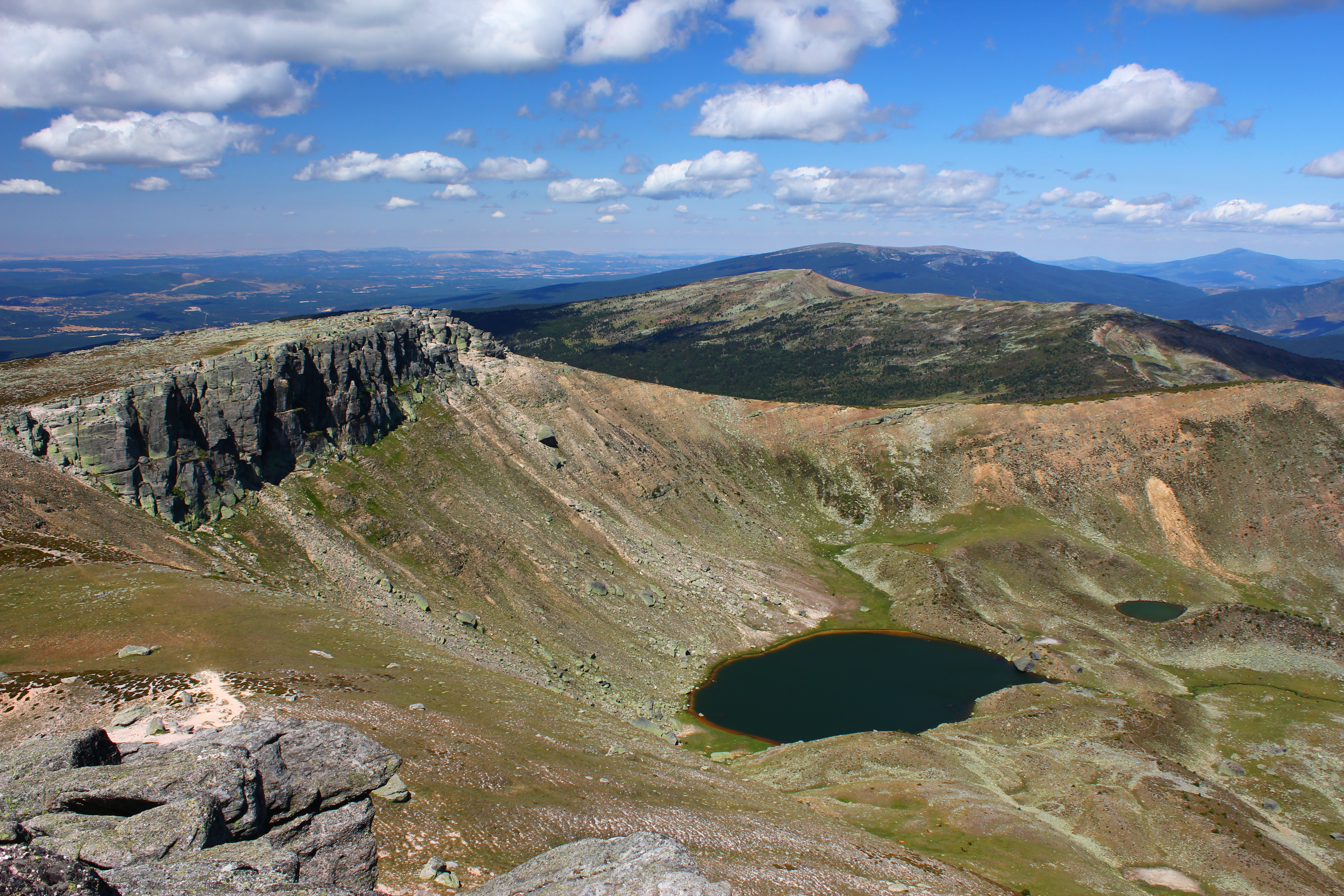
- Lake Urbíon near the summit of Pico del Urbión
- Type: Geological formation
- Sub-units: Pinilla de los Moros, Castrillo de la Reina, Larriba & Piedrahita de Muñó Formations
- Underlies: Enciso Group
- Overlies: Oncala Group

Lithology
- Primary: Limestone, sandstone
- Other: Claystone, conglomerate

Location
- Coordinates: 42.1°N 2.3°W
- Approximate paleocoordinates: 32.4°N 9.0°E
- Region: Burgos & Soria provinces, Castille and León; La Rioja
- Country: Spain
- Extent: Cameros Basin, Sierra de la Demanda

Type section
- Named for: Picos de Urbión
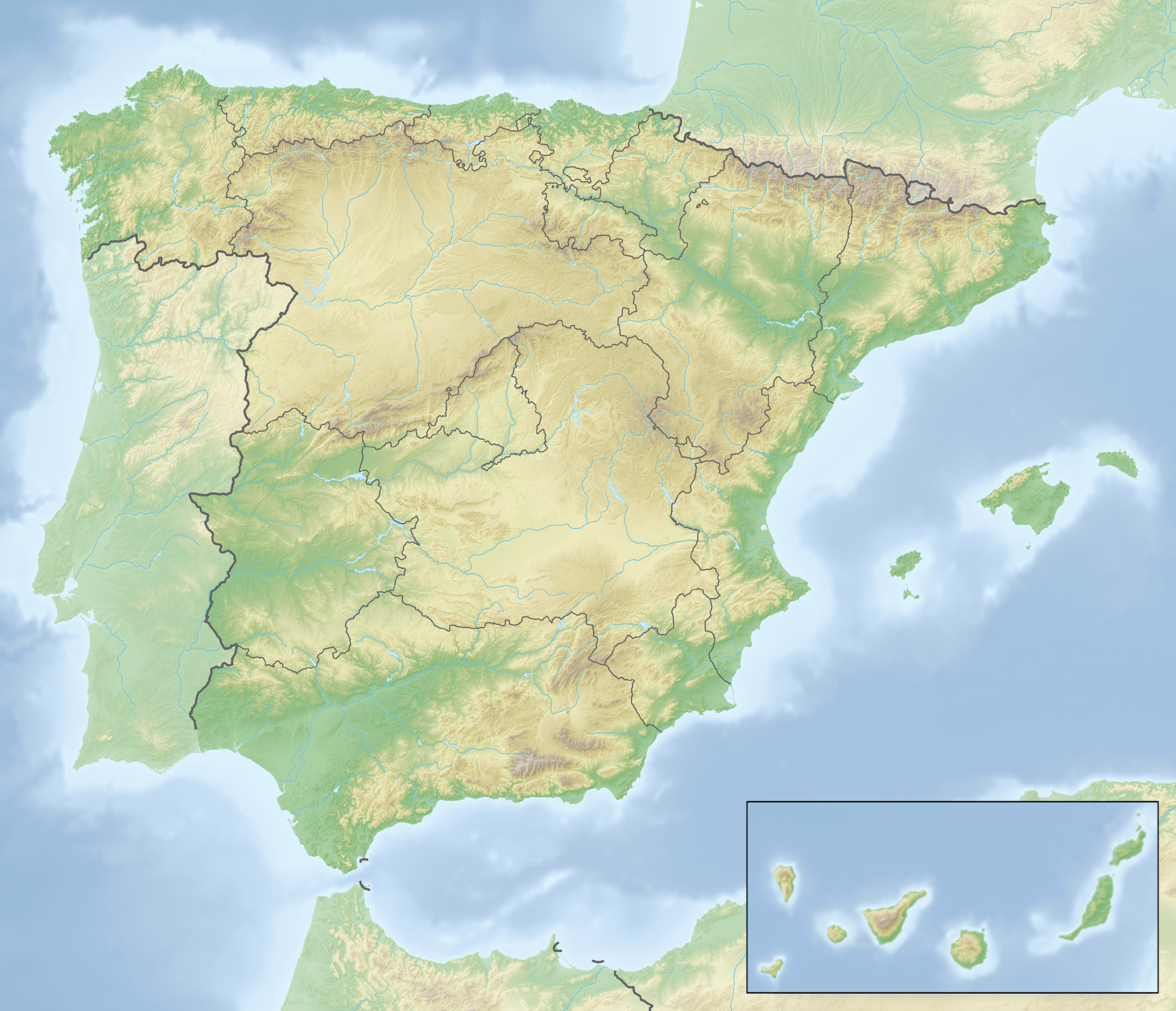
- Urbión Group (Spain)

The Urbión Group is a geological group in Castile and León and La Rioja, Spain whose strata date back to the Early Cretaceous (late Hauterivian to late Barremian. The formations of the group comprise a sequence of brown limestones in a matrix of black silt, sandstones, claystones and conglomerates deposited under terrestrial conditions, in alluvial fan and fluvial environments.

Dinosaur remains are among the fossils that have been recovered from the formation.

== Description ==
The Urbión Group, named after the Picos de Urbión, comprises a sequence of brown limestones in a matrix of black silt, sandstones, claystones and conglomerates deposited under terrestrial conditions, in alluvial fan and fluvial environments.

The contact with the overlying Enciso Group is exposed at the Presa Enciso tracksite.

== Fossil content ==
=== Demandasaurus darwini ===
The fossil bones of Demandasaurus were recovered in the "Tenadas de los Vallejos II" quarry, located 10 kilometres (6.2 mi) southwest of the town of Salas de los Infantes (Province of Burgos, northern Spain). In geological terms, this area lies within the western Cameros Basin, which is located in the north−westernmost part of the Iberian Range, outcropping in the provinces of Burgos, Soria and La Rioja. This basin is one of the most subsident basins formed during the rift interval at the end of the Jurassic and the Early Cretaceous, which affected this part of the Iberian Peninsula.

The sediments of the Tenadas de los Vallejos II quarry belong to the Castrillo de la Reina Formation and comprise red clay beds intercalated with sheet−like sandstone channel fills that are interpreted as floodplain and fluvial channel deposits respectively. The fluvial system of the Castrillo de la Reina Formation shows a braided channel pattern with well developed and drained floodplains. This lithostratigraphic unit belongs to the fifth depositional sequence of the six ones that divide the basin. The age of the fifth depositional sequence is Late Barremian to Early Aptian as is suggested by charophyte and ostracod biostratigraphy.

The Tenadas de los Vallejos II site was discovered in 1999 during prospection work carried out by the Archaeological−Palaeontological Group of Salas de los Infantes (Colectivo Arqueológico−Paleontológico de Salas de los Infantes, CAS).

Ten caudal vertebrae, a haemal arch, two ischia and a femur, as well as bone fragments were collected in the site. Excavations were carried out during the years 2002–2004, covering a surface area of some 240 square metres (2,600 sq ft). Approximately 810 skeletal elements and bone fragments were recovered, and most of them belong to a single specimen of rebbachisaurid sauropod. The remains were found disarticulated in the same bed and in close proximity to each other. The neural arches of the vertebrae are firmly co−ossified to the centra. There are no anatomically repeated elements, and the bones correspond presumably to a single individual. The relative size of the bones suggests a medium−sized individual whose total length was approximately 10 to 12 metres (33 to 39 ft). In addition, several vertebral centra and femur fragments from a small ornithopod, two spinosaurid theropod vertebrae and a crocodile tooth were recovered from the site.

=== Other fossils ===
Among others, the following fossils have been reported from the Urbión Group:

- Chitracephalus dumonii - Pinilla de los Moros Formation
- Larachelus morla - Pinilla de los Moros Formation
- Europatitan eastwoodi - Castrillo de la Reina Formation
- Goniopholis sp.
- Lepidotes sp.
- Polacanthus sp.
- Baryonychinae indet.
- Crocodyliformes indet.
- Hypsilophodontidae indet.
- Iguanodontia indet.
- Rhabdodontidae indet.
- Testudines indet.
- ichnofossils
  - Brachyguanodonipus sp.

== Correlation ==
Early Cretaceous stratigraphy of Iberia
| Ma | Age | Paleomap \ Basins | Cantabrian | Olanyà | Cameros | Maestrazgo | Oliete | Galve | Morella | South Iberian | Pre-betic | Lusitanian |
|---|---|---|---|---|---|---|---|---|---|---|---|---|
| 100 | Cenomanian | | La Cabana | Sopeira | Utrillas | | Mosquerela | | | | | Caranguejeira |
| 100 | Cenomanian | | Altamira | Sopeira | Utrillas | | | | | | | Caranguejeira |
| 100 | Cenomanian | | Eguino | Sopeira | Utrillas | | | | | | | Caranguejeira |
| 125 | Albian | | Ullaga - Balmaseda | Lluçà | Utrillas | | | | | Traiguera | | Caranguejeira |
| 125 | Albian | | Monte Grande | Lluçà | Escucha | | Escucha | | | Jijona | | Caranguejeira |
| 125 | Albian | | Itxina - Miono | Lluçà | Escucha | | Escucha | | | | | Caranguejeira |
| 125 | Aptian | | Valmaseda - Tellamendi | Lluçà | Ol Gp. - Castrillo | Benassal | Escucha | Benassal | | | | Olhos |
| 125 | Aptian | | Valmaseda - Tellamendi | Font | En Gp. - Leza | Morella/Oliete | Oliete | Villaroya | Morella | Capas; Rojas | | Almargem |
| 125 | Aptian | | Patrocinio - Ernaga | Senyús | En Gp. - Jubela | Forcall | | | Morella | Villaroya | Upper; Bedoulian | Figueira |
| 125 | Barremian | | Vega de Pas | Cabó | Abejar | Xert | Alacón | Xert | Morella | Huérguina | Upper; Bedoulian | Assises |
| 125 | Barremian | | Vega de Pas | Prada | Abejar | Artoles | | | Morella | Collado | Moutonianum | Papo Seco |
| 125 | Barremian | | Vega de Pas | Rúbies | Tera Gp. - Golmayo | Alacón/Blesa | Blesa | Camarillas | Mirambel | Collado | Moutonianum | Papo Seco |
| 150 | Hauterivian | | Vega de Pas | Rúbies | Ur Gp. - Pinilla | Llacova | Blesa | Castellar | Tera Gp. - Pinilla | Villares | | Porto da Calada |
| 150 | Hauterivian | | Vega de Pas | Rúbies | Ur Gp. - Pinilla | Llacova | hiatus | Castellar | | Villares | | Porto da Calada |
| 150 | Hauterivian | | Vega de Pas | Rúbies | Ur Gp. - Pinilla | Huerva | hiatus | Castellar | Gaita | | | Porto da Calada |
| 150 | Valanginian | | Villaro | Rúbies | Ur Gp. - Larriba | Huerva | hiatus | Castellar | Ped Gp. - Hortigüela | | | Porto da Calada |
| 150 | Valanginian | | Villaro | Rúbies | Ped Gp. - Hortigüela | Huerva | hiatus | Castellar | Ped Gp. - Piedrahita | | | Porto da Calada |
| 150 | Valanginian | | Villaro | Rúbies | Peñacoba | Huerva | hiatus | Galve | Ped Gp. - Piedrahita | Miravetes | | Porto da Calada |
| 150 | Berriasian | | Cab Gp. - Arcera | Rúbies | Valdeprado | hiatus | hiatus | Alfambra | Ped Gp. - Piedrahita | Miravetes | | Porto da Calada |
| 150 | Berriasian | | Cab Gp. - Arcera | | TdL Gp. - Rupelo | hiatus | hiatus | Arzobispo | hiatus | Tollo | | Porto da Calada |
| 150 | Berriasian | | Cab Gp. - Arcera | | On Gp. - Huérteles; Sierra Matute | hiatus | hiatus | Arzobispo | hiatus | Tollo | | Porto da Calada |
| 150 | Tithonian | | Lastres | | Tera Gp. - Magaña | hiatus | Higuereles | | hiatus | Tera Gp. - Magaña | | Lourinhã |
| 150 | Tithonian | | Lastres | | Tera Gp. - Magaña | hiatus | Higuereles | | Arzobispo | Tera Gp. - Magaña | | Lourinhã |
| 150 | Tithonian | | Lastres | | Ágreda | hiatus | Higuereles | | Arzobispo | Tera Gp. - Magaña | | Lourinhã |
| Legend | | Major fossiliferous, oofossiliferous, ichnofossiliferous, coproliferous, minor formation | | | | | | | | | | |

== See also ==
- List of dinosaur-bearing rock formations
