= Draconyx =

Draconyx Temporal range: Late Jurassic, Tithonian
- Skeletal reconstruction

Scientific classification
- Kingdom: Animalia
- Phylum: Chordata
- Class: Reptilia
- Clade: Dinosauria
- Clade: †Ornithischia
- Clade: †Ornithopoda
- Genus: †Draconyx; Mateus & Antunes, 2001
- Species: †D. loureiroi

Binomial name
- †Draconyx loureiroi Mateus & Antunes, 2001

Extinct genus of dinosaurs

Draconyx (meaning "dragon claw") is a genus of ornithopod dinosaur from the Late Jurassic of what is now Portugal. It was found in the Lourinhã Formation in 1991, and described by Octávio Mateus and Miguel Telles Antunes in 2001.

== Description ==
The type species, known from only partial remains, is Draconyx loureiroi. The generic name is derived from Latin draco, "dragon", and Ancient Greek ὄνυξ, onyx, "claw". The specific name is in honour of João de Loureiro, a Portuguese jesuit priest, a pioneer in Portuguese palaeontology.

== Discovery ==
Size compared to a human

The holotype, ML 357, a partial skeleton lacking the skull, consists of two maxillary teeth, three caudal centra, one chevron, a distal epiphysis of right humerus, one manual phalanx, three manual unguals, a distal epiphysis of the right femur, the proximal and distal epiphyses of the tibia and fibula, an astragalus, a calcanaeum, three tarsals, four metatarsals and pedal phalanges. It was in 1991 found at Vale de Frades by Carlos Anunciação of the Museu da Lourinhã, in layers of the Bombarral Unit dating to the Tithonian. Histology shows that the holotype specimen reached skeletally maturity after the age between 27 and 31 years old. A left femur (ML 434), found near Praia do Caniçal, has been referred to this taxon. Draconyx was a small bipedal herbivore. Gregory S. Paul in 2010 estimated the length at 3.5 metres, the weight at 150 kilograms.

== Systematics ==
According to Mateus and Antunes (2001), Draconyx loureiroi is a member of the Iguanodontia, more specifically the Camptosauridae, based on the maxillary teeth, which have a strong vertical primary ridge on the distal side of the labial crown, and the femur, which is curved and has a prominent lesser trochanter. An article in 2022 places Draconyx as a Styracosterna.
