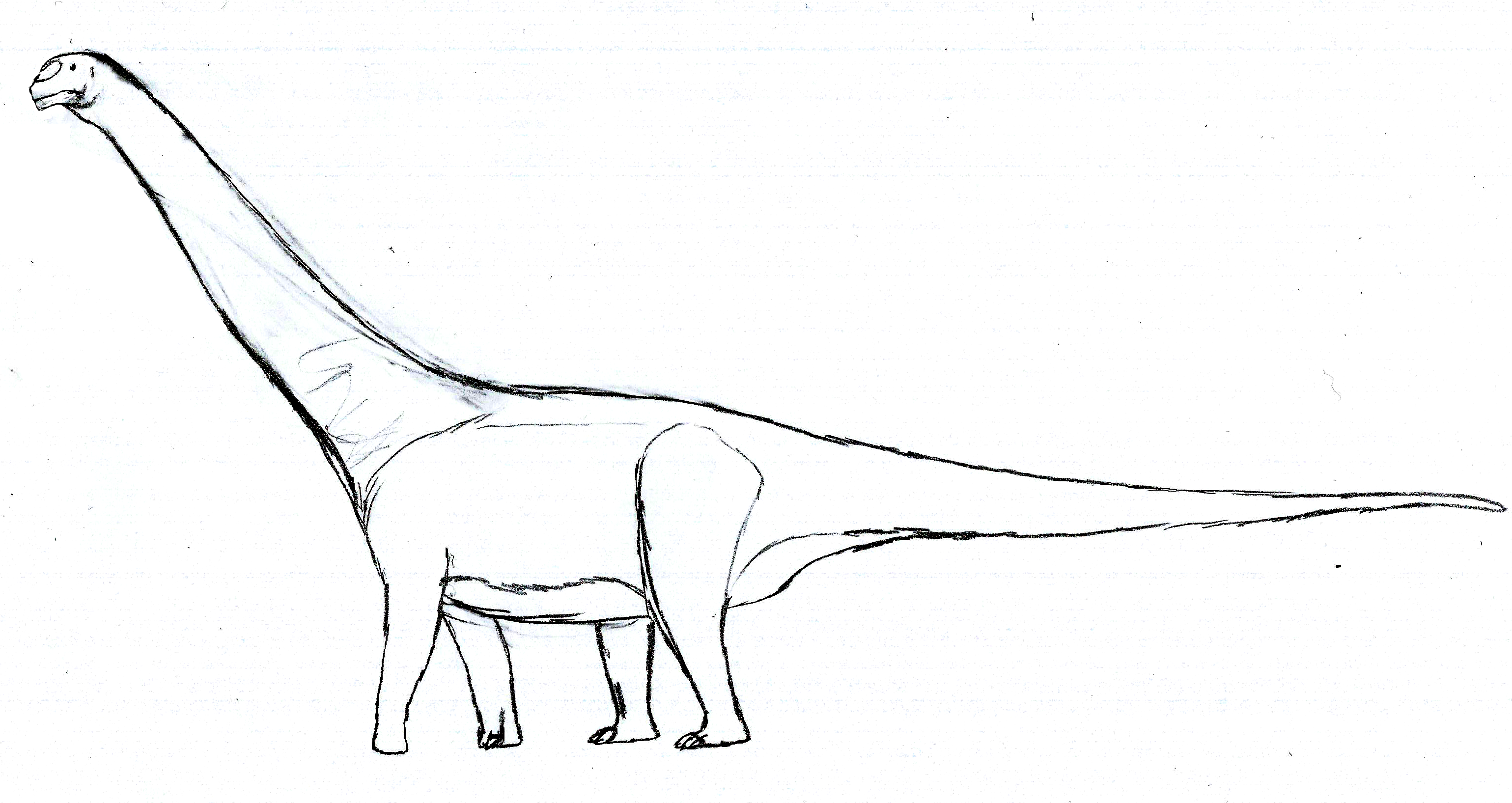
- Restoration

Scientific classification
- Kingdom: Animalia
- Phylum: Chordata
- Class: Reptilia
- Clade: Dinosauria
- Clade: Saurischia
- Clade: †Sauropodomorpha
- Clade: †Sauropoda
- Clade: †Macronaria
- Genus: †Aragosaurus; Sanz et al., 1987
- Species: †A. ischiaticus

Binomial name
- †Aragosaurus ischiaticus Sanz et al., 1987

= Aragosaurus =

Aragosaurus Temporal range: Early Cretaceous, Berriasian

Extinct genus of dinosaurs

Aragosaurus (meaning "Aragon lizard") was a genus of sauropod dinosaur from the Early Cretaceous period of Galve, province of Teruel, in the autonomous territory of Aragón, Spain. It was deposited in the Villar del Arzobispo Formation.

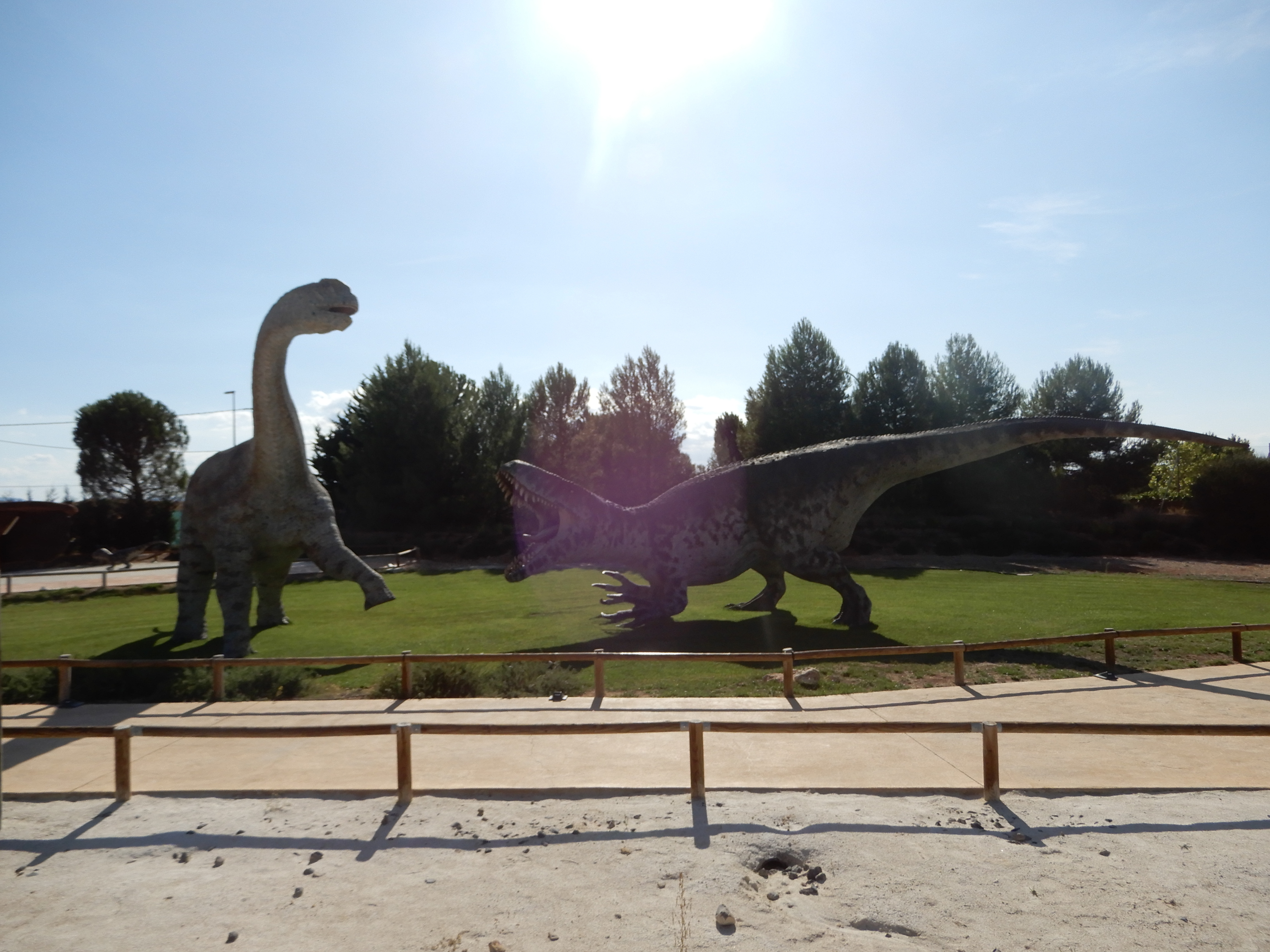
Models of Aragosaurus and Torvosaurus, Dinópolis

Aragosaurus was a large, quadrupedal plant-eating (herbivorous) dinosaur, which lived during the early Berriasian, about 145-140 million years ago. It was about 18 metres (59 ft) in length and about 25 tonnes in weight.

Like other sauropods, it had a long neck, a long powerful tail, a small head and a bulky body. It was broadly similar to Camarasaurus. It is represented by a partial skeleton, which was found in Spain and was named by Sanz, Buscalioni, Casanovi and Santafe in 1987. The type species is A. ischiaticus. Like Camarasaurus, Aragosaurus probably had a short, compact skull and a moderately long neck. The teeth were large and wide, and would have been useful for slicing through the leaves and branches of tall conifer trees. The forelimbs were only a little shorter than the hind limbs, and the tail was long and muscular.
