= Enciso Group =

Spanish geological formation

- Stratigraphic range: Hauterivian-early Aptian; ~135–118 Ma
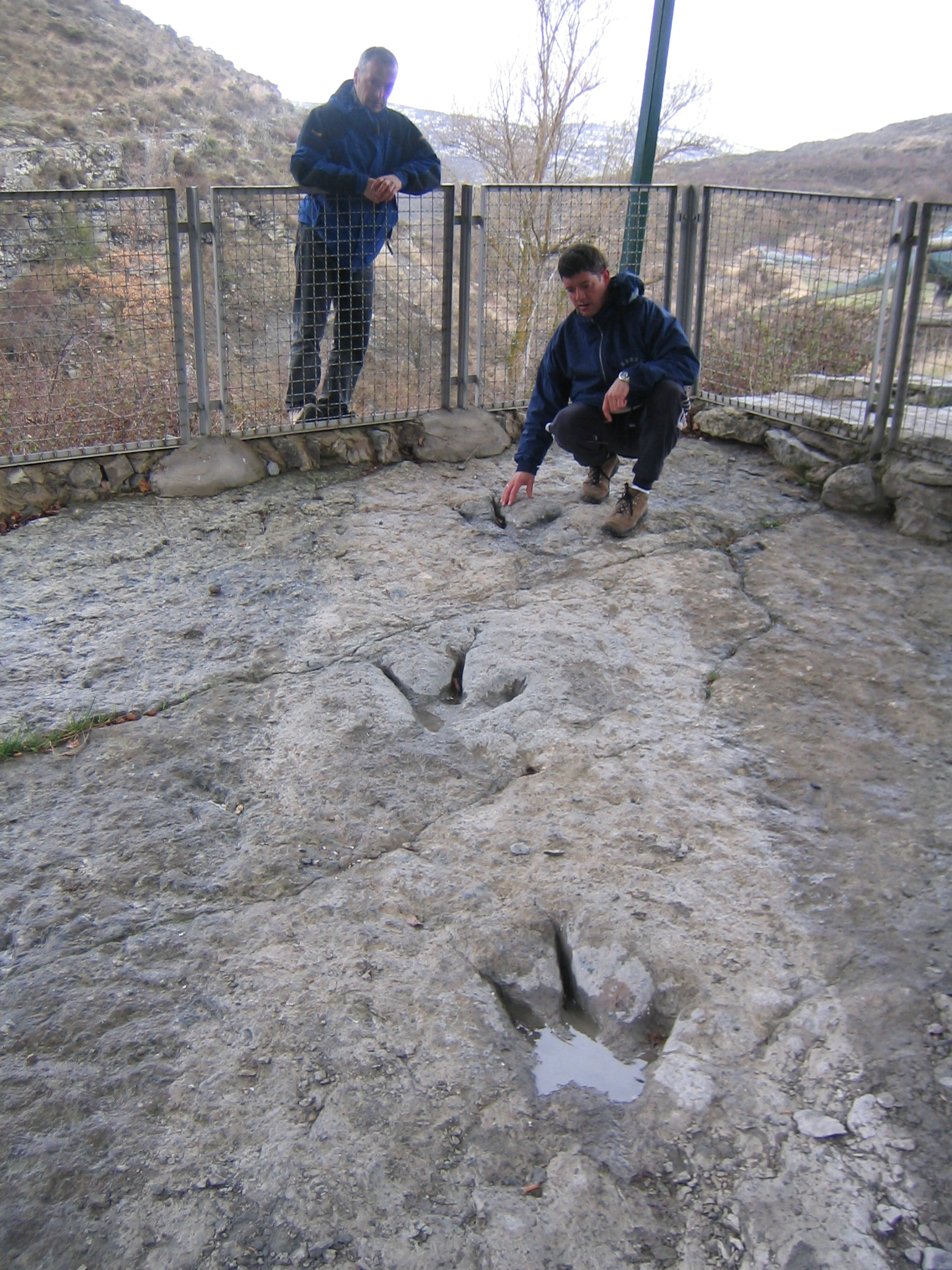
- Ichnofossils near Enciso
- Type: Geologic group
- Sub-units: Leza & Jubela Formations
- Underlies: Oliván Group
- Overlies: Urbión Group

Lithology
- Primary: Sandstone, limestone
- Other: Marl, mudstone

Location
- Coordinates: 42.1°N 2.3°W
- Approximate paleocoordinates: 31.7°N 9.0°E
- Region: La Rioja
- Country: Spain
- Extent: Cameros Basin

Type section
- Named for: Enciso, La Rioja
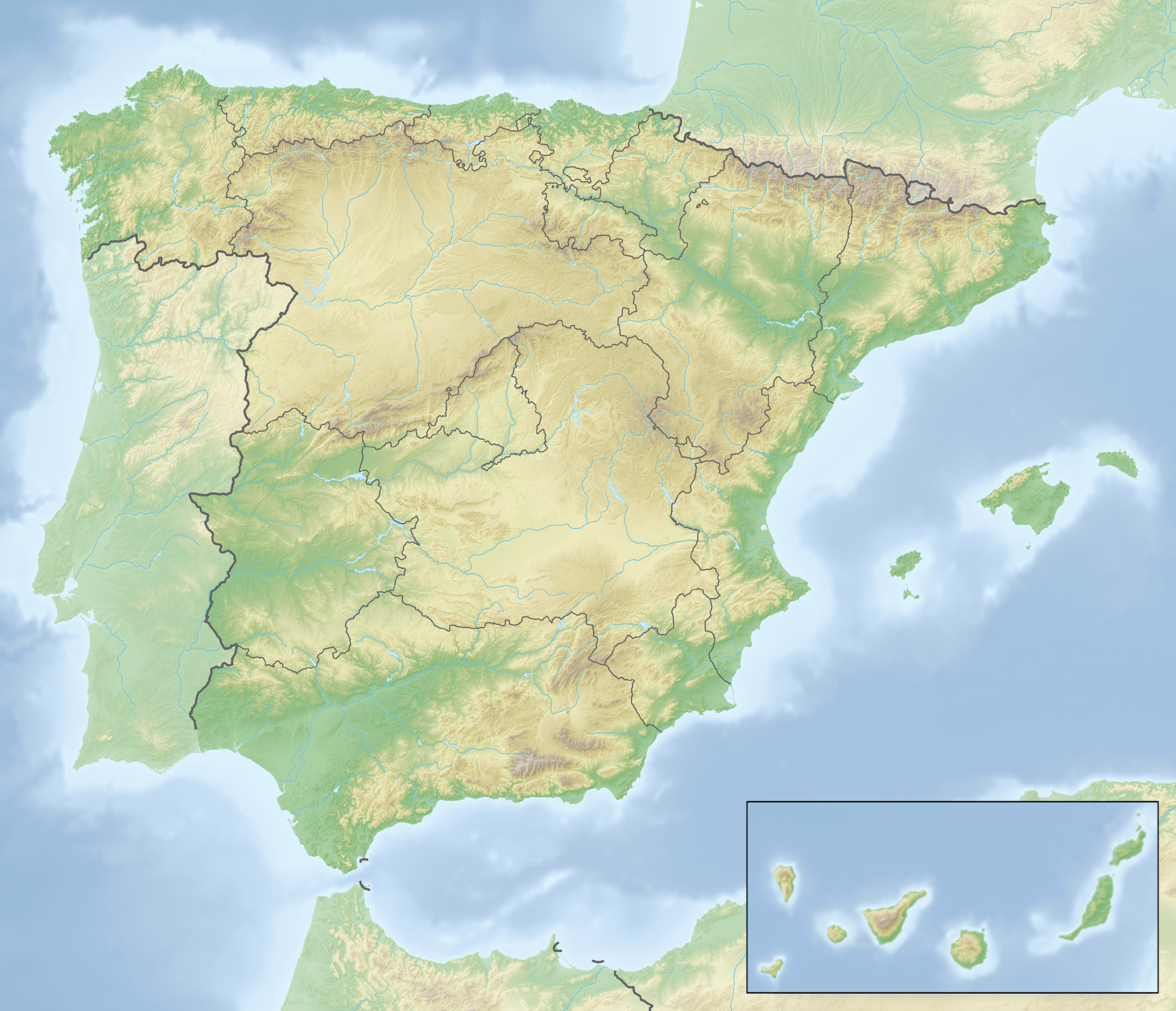
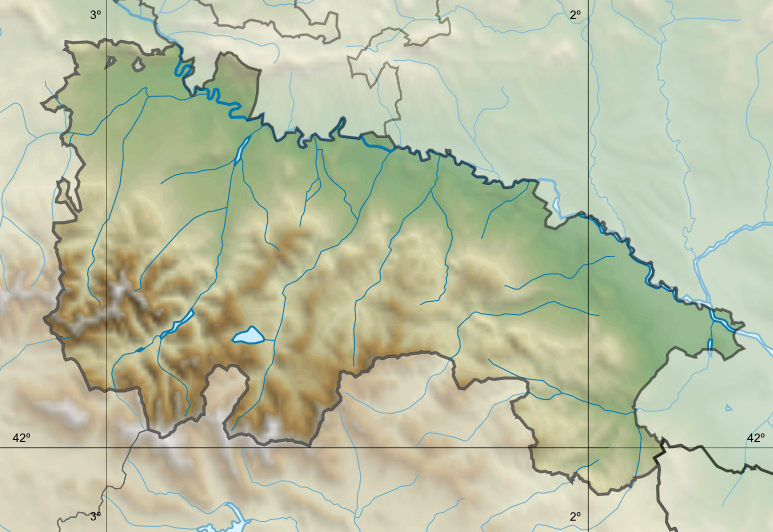
- Enciso Group (Spain) Enciso Group (La Rioja, Spain)

The Enciso Group is a geological formation in La Rioja, Spain whose strata date back to the Early Cretaceous.

The turtle Camerochelys was described from the Enciso Group. Dinosaur remains, including the holotype of the spinosaurid Riojavenatrix, are among the fossils that have been recovered from the formation.

The first spinosaurid fossil remains found at Igea, Enciso Group were a jaw fragment found in 1983 and isolated teeth.

== Description ==
The Cameros Basin containing the Enciso Group represents continental synrift deposition. It consists of carbonate and siliciclastic lacustrine deposits. Cobble to boulder-sized dropstones and sand to silt sized IRD were observed in three different lithofacies. These are restricted glaciolacustrine shales, laminated glaciolacustrine silts, and proglacial sandy lobes correlated to glacier front retreat. This deep glacial lake system is compared favourably lacustrine sediment sequences related to Pleistocene glacial cycles of the Laurentide Ice Sheet in the eastern Canadian Arctic. This along with other evidence of cryospheric activity suggested extensive continental ice sheets during the Hauterivian Cold Snap.

== Fossil content ==
The following fossils have been found in the formation:

Color key: Taxon / Reclassified taxon / Taxon falsely reported as present / Dubious taxon or junior synonym / Ichnotaxon / Ootaxon / Morphotaxon	Notes; Uncertain or tentative taxa are in small text; ~~crossed out~~ taxa are discredited.

=== Dinosaurs ===
==== Ornithischians ====
Ornithischians of the Enciso Group
Genus	Species	Location	Stratigraphic position	Material	Notes	Images
Styracosterna Indet.	Indeterminate					

==== Theropods ====
Theropods of the Enciso Group
Genus	Species	Location	Stratigraphic position	Material	Notes	Images
Riojavenatrix	R. lacustris				A baryonychine spinosaurid	

=== Turtles ===
Turtles of the Enciso Group
Genus	Species	Location	Stratigraphic position	Material	Notes	Images
Camerochelys	C. vilanovai				A xinjiangchelyid turtle	

== See also ==
- List of dinosaur-bearing rock formations
