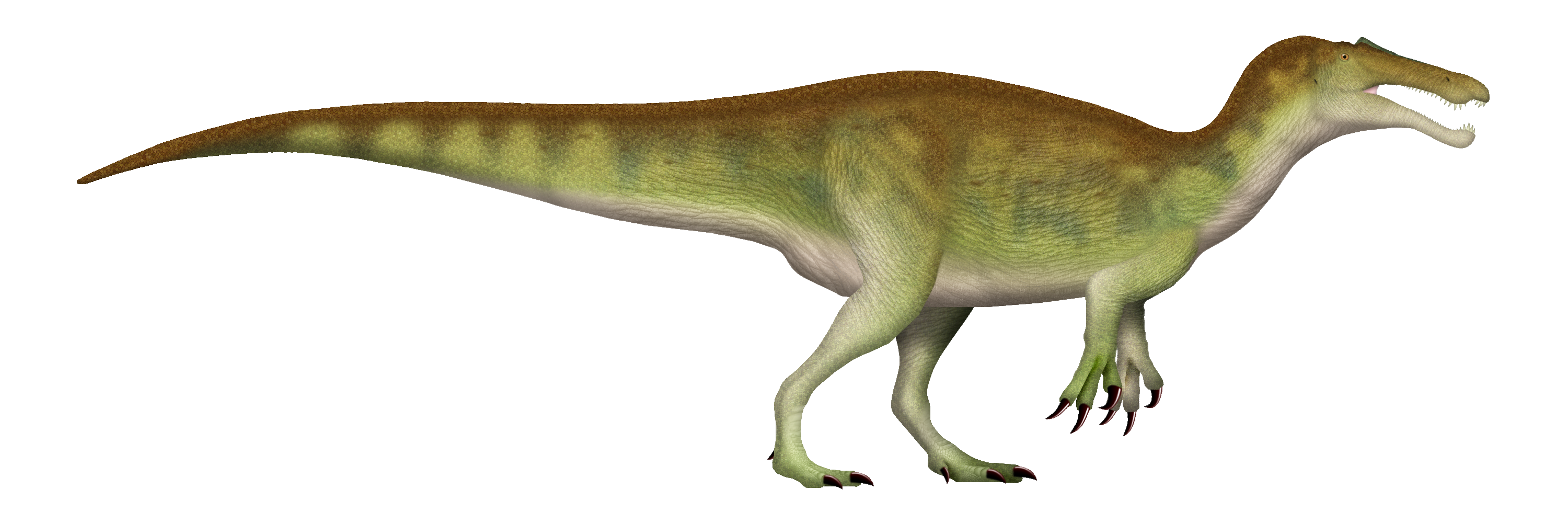
- Speculative life restoration

Scientific classification
- Kingdom: Animalia
- Phylum: Chordata
- Class: Reptilia
- Clade: Dinosauria
- Clade: Saurischia
- Clade: Theropoda
- Family: †Spinosauridae
- Subfamily: †Baryonychinae
- Genus: †Riojavenatrix; Isasmendi et al., 2024

Type species
- †Riojavenatrix lacustris Isasmendi et al., 2024

= Riojavenatrix =

Riojavenatrix Temporal range: Early Cretaceous, Barremian–Aptian

Genus of spinosaurid theropod dinosaur

Riojavenatrix (meaning "La Rioja huntress") is a genus of spinosaurid theropod dinosaurs from the Early Cretaceous Enciso Group of La Rioja, Spain. The type species is Riojavenatrix lacustris. Riojavenatrix represents one of five known spinosaurid taxa from the Iberian Peninsula, the others being Camarillasaurus, Iberospinus, Protathlitis, and Vallibonavenatrix.

== Discovery and naming ==
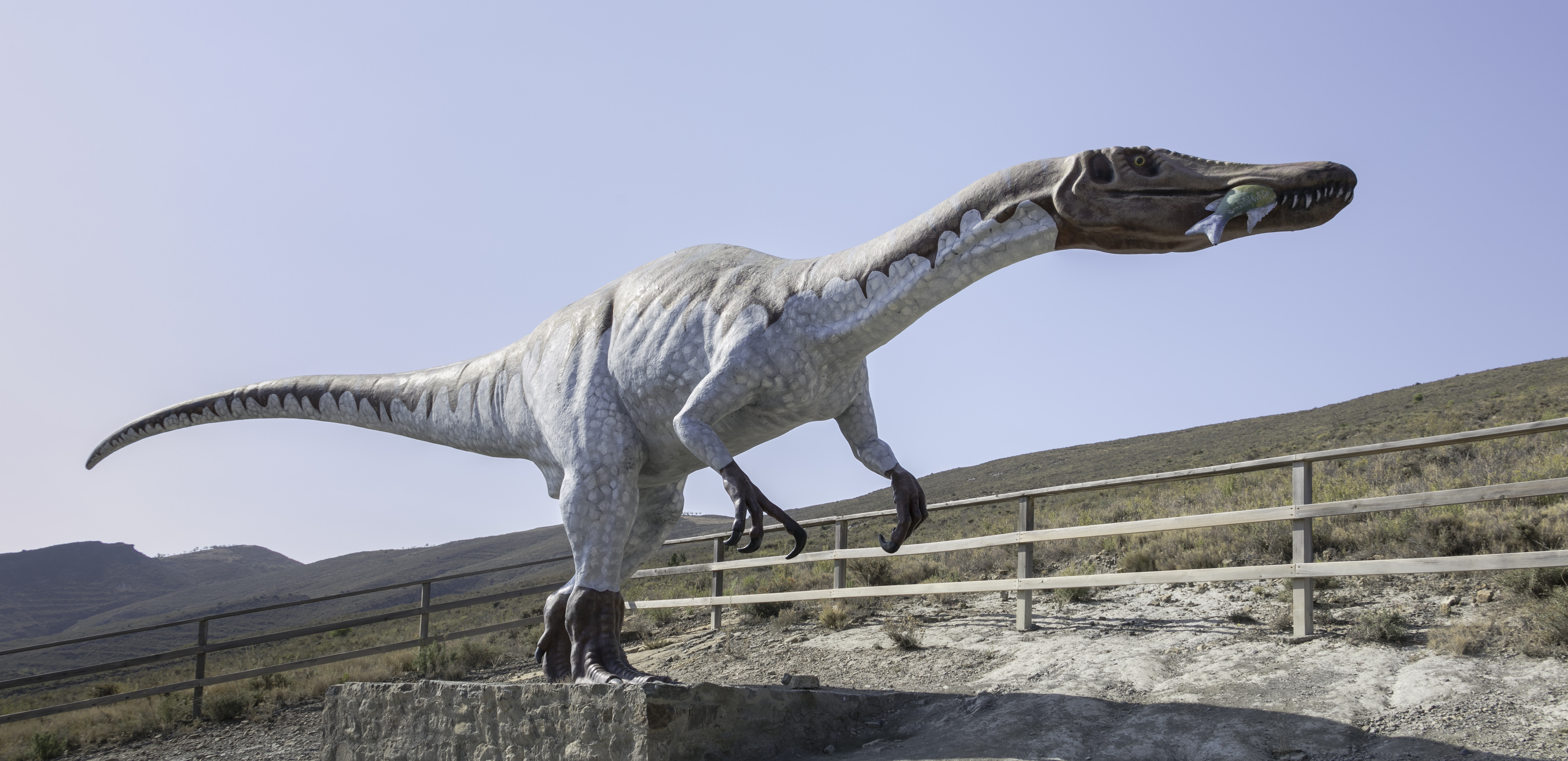
Model in La Rioja originally labelled as Baryonyx

Fossils of Riojavenatrix were discovered in 2005 at the Virgen del Villar-1 site in La Rioja, Spain. The holotype of Riojavenatrix is a fragmentary dorsal vertebra, pelvic girdle, and hindlimb elements that were initially assigned to Baryonyx. Apparently, all the material belonged to the same individual because it was recovered in association with bones of consistent size and no duplicated elements.

The Virgen del Villar-1 site is a part of the Enciso Group, dated as uppermost Barremian–lower Aptian. The age of this site is likely to be lower Aptian. It makes Riojavenatrix younger than Baryonyx, Camarillasaurus, Ceratosuchops, Iberospinus, Riparovenator, and likely Vallibonavenatrix. Although age estimates for Ichthyovenator and Suchomimus are imprecise, Riojavenatrix lived around the same time as them. Riojavenatrix is older than the more derived mid-Cretaceous African and South American spinosaurids.

It was named as a new genus of spinosaurid theropod in 2024. The generic name, Riojavenatrix, comes from La Rioja province in Spain, plus the Latin venatrix, meaning "huntress". The specific name, "lacustris", is Latin for "from the lake".

== Classification ==
Riojavenatrix was assigned to Spinosauridae based on the features of the pubis and femur, and more precisely to Baryonychinae based on the features of the femur, fibula, and tibia. Its astragalus also bears some similarity to Spinosaurinae. It is one of the youngest baryonychines known, and the fifth spinosaurid found in the Iberian Peninsula.

The following cladograms illustrate the results of the analyzes obtained by the authors of the Riojavenatrix description using different data sets. The first tree shows several alternative positions.

Rauhut & Pol (2021)

- Megalosauroidea
  - Megalosauridae
  - - Monolophosaurus
    - Spinosauridae
      - Baryonychinae
        - Riojavenatrix
        - - - Riojavenatrix
            - Suchomimus
          - Baryonyx
      - Spinosaurinae
        - Riojavenatrix
        - - Ichthyovenator
          - Spinosaurus

Mateus & Estraviz-López (2022)

- Megalosauroidea
  - Megalosauridae
  - Spinosauridae
    - Riojavenatrix
    - Iberospinus
    - Vallibonavenatrix
    - Spinosaurus
    - Ichthyovenator
    - Irritator
    - - Suchomimus
      - Baryonyx

In their 2025 reassessment of Camarillasaurus, Rauhut and colleagues found support for a baryonychine placement of Riojavenatrix.
