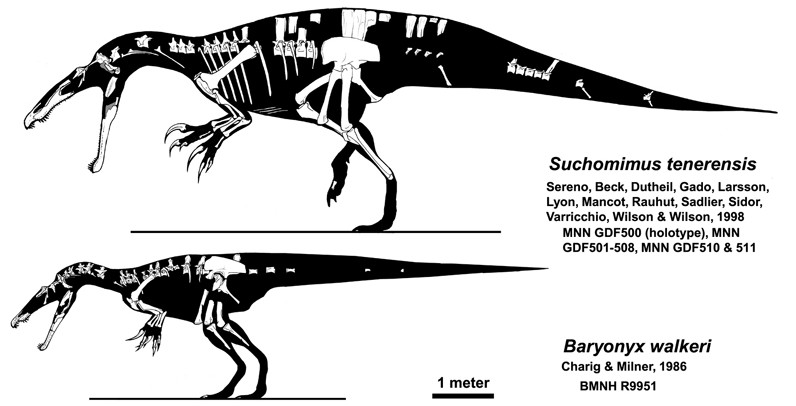
- Reconstructed skeletons of two baryonychine genera: Suchomimus and Baryonyx

Scientific classification
- Kingdom: Animalia
- Phylum: Chordata
- Class: Reptilia
- Clade: Dinosauria
- Clade: Saurischia
- Clade: Theropoda
- Family: †Spinosauridae
- Subfamily: †Baryonychinae; Charig & Milner, 1986

Type species
- †Baryonyx walkeri Charig & Milner, 1986

Subgroups
- †Baryonyx; †Cristatusaurus?; †Eocarcharia?; †Iberospinus?; †Protathlitis?; †Riojavenatrix; †Suchosaurus; †Ceratosuchopsini; †Ceratosuchops; †Eocarcharia?; †Riparovenator; †Suchomimus

= Baryonychinae =

Baryonychines Temporal range: Early Cretaceous

Subfamily of spinosaurid dinosaurs

Baryonychinae is an extinct clade or subfamily of spinosaurids from the Early Cretaceous of Europe and West Africa. The clade was named by Charig & Milner in 1986 and defined by Sereno et al. in 1998 and Holtz et al. in 2004 as all taxa both closely related to Baryonyx walkeri and Spinosaurus aegyptiacus.

Baryonychines were large, bipedal predators with elongated, crocodile-like skulls and lower jaw tips fanning out into rosettes bearing conical, often unserrated, teeth, and a distinct premaxillary notch. They possessed robust forelimbs supporting three-fingered hands with an enlarged first digit claw, to which the subfamily name indirectly refers. Members of this group, unlike the more derived Spinosaurinae, sported only low sails or none at all.

== History of discovery ==
In 1820, paleontologist Gideon Mantell discovered numerous fossil teeth from the Wadhurst Clay Formation of Britain. These were in 1841 named Suchosaurus cultridens by paleontologist Richard Owen, and were identified as a crocodilian. A second species, Suchosaurus girardi, was named in 1897 by Henri-Émile Sauvage from the Papo Seco Formation of Portugal. It was not until the description of Baryonyx in 1986 that these remains were identified as spinosaurid teeth and Suchosaurus was placed in the Spinosauridae.

The second described representative of the subfamily was unearthed in 1983 by fossil collector William John Walker, within the Smokejacks Pit, Weald Clay Formation, Surrey, England. This initiated the involvement of the Natural History Museum of London, discovering a 65% complete skeleton: NHMUK VP R9951. In 1986, the specimen was published and described by Alan J. Charig and Angela C. Milner as Baryonyx walkeri, with a more detailed monograph published in 1997. Teeth, hand bones, and vertebrae attributed to the genus were later discovered in 1998 and 2004. The same year, Spinosaurinae and Baryonychinae were cladistically defined by Holtz and colleagues.

In 1973, paleontologist Philippe Taquet discovered specimen MNHN GDF 266 consisting of two premaxillae, a partial maxilla, and a dentary, along with several similar remains from Gadoufaoua, Elrhaz Formation, Niger. They were in 1998 described as the holotype and paratypes of Cristatusaurus lapparenti, although after several inconclusive debates on whether or not the specimen represents the then newly described Baryonyx.

In 1997, Paul Sereno and colleagues discovered a ~67% complete skeleton, MNN GDF500, in Gadoufaoua. The next year, Sereno et al. described the specimen as the new baryonychine Suchomimus tenerensis. The species was also the subject of synonymy disputes over Cristatusaurus and Baryonyx throughout the 1990s and 2000s.

From 2013 to 2020, several spinosaurid fragments were discovered from the Wessex Formation in Britain. In 2021, Barker et al. described these specimens, IWCMS 2014.95.5, IWCMS 2021.30, IWCMS 2014.95.1-3, IWCMS 2014.95.4, IWCMS 2014.95.6, IWCMS 2014.96.1, 2; 2020.448.1, 2, and IWCMS 2014.96.3, as the two new genera Ceratosuchops inferodios and Riparovenator milnerae. The study defined a new subclade within Baryonychinae: Ceratosuchopsini, defined as all taxa more closely related to Ceratosuchops inferodios than to Baryonyx walkeri. According to the performed analysis and clade definition, the group contains Ceratosuchops, Riparovenator, and Suchomimus. A 2025 review of Cretaceous theropods of Africa concluded that the hypodigm of Eocarcharia—a contemporary of Suchomimus traditionally regarded as a basal carcharodontosaurid—was chimaeric, comprising a single carcharodontosaurian element (an isolated maxilla) and several remains of a spinosaurid: the holotype (an isolated postorbital) and referred skull roof material. Several anatomical characteristics supported baryonychine affinities for the non-maxilla Eocarcharia material, simultaneously excluding allosauroid affinities. A phylogenetic analysis supported the placement of this taxon within the Ceratosuchopsini, as the sister taxon to Suchomimus.

Baryonychines may have been particularly diverse in the Iberian Peninsula, as suggested by the description of multiple new taxa in the early 2020s: Iberospinus natarioi (Papo Seco Formation) in 2022, Protathlitis cinctorrensis (Arcillas de Morella Formation) in 2023, and Riojavenatrix lacustris (Enciso Group) in 2024. However, redescription of the non-baryonychine spinosaurid Camarillasaurus found Protathlitis to be a dubious chimera, while via phylogenetic analysis, it recovered Iberospinus as the basalmost spinosaurine, rather than a baryonychine.

Numerous undescribed specimens have been found as well, such as XMDFEC V0010, described in 2010 by Hone, Xu and Wang; a theropod tooth from the Majiacun Formation of China dated to ~86-85 million years ago. They interpreted the tooth as belonging to a probable baryonychine, which would expand the temporal range of Baryonychinae, and Megalosauroidea as a whole, well into the Late Cretaceous. However, this tooth lacked spinosaurid synapomorphies. Other undescribed specimens include UT-JAW2 from Libya and various remains from Spain, such as Baryonychinae indet. from Vallipón, Castellote, Spain, LAD0-2 from Spain CMP-2 from Cantera del Mas de la Parreta 1, from Castilla y Leon, from the El Castellar Formation, Tenadas del Jabali, and from Mas de Curolles.

== Description ==
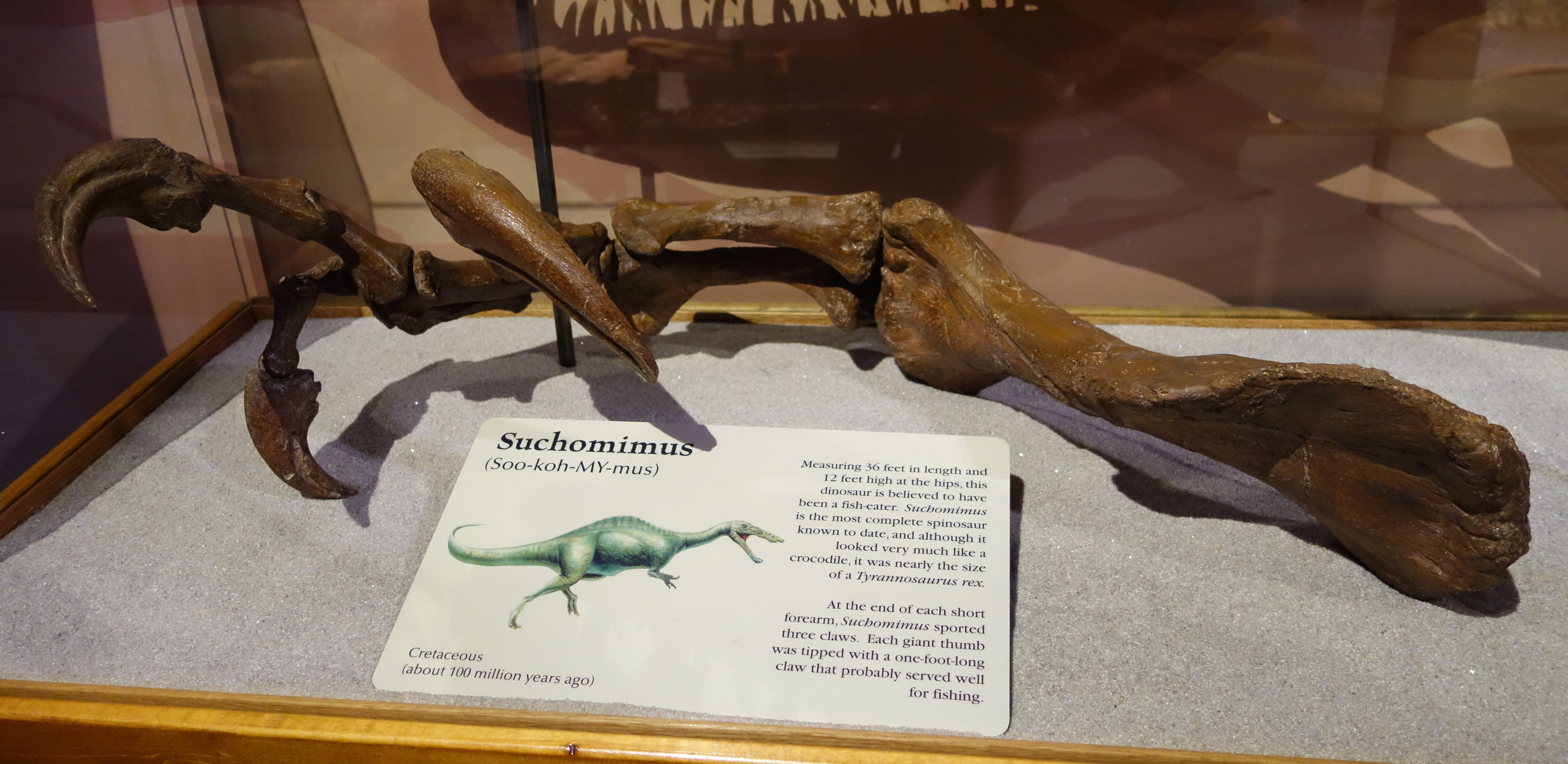
Reconstructed forelimb and hand of Suchomimus, Museum of Ancient Life, Utah

Even though baryonychines were on average smaller than the more advanced spinosaurines, they were still decently large compared to theropods in general. The smallest members, Ceratosuchops and Riparovenator, are estimated at 8–9 m (26–29 ft) and ~1.4-2 tons, while the largest member, Suchomimus, is estimated to measure 9.5–11 m (31 –36 ft) in length and 3–4.7 tons in weight. Members of this family, like other spinosaurids, sported robust forelimbs with large, three-clawed hands. However, unlike the more derived spinosaurines, these animals possessed small sails, as in Suchomimus, Riparovenator, and Ceratosuchops (for the latter two, sails were assumed judging by their phylogenetic position); some with only the vertebrae of the sacral region being elongated, or none at all, as in Baryonyx.

=== Skull ===
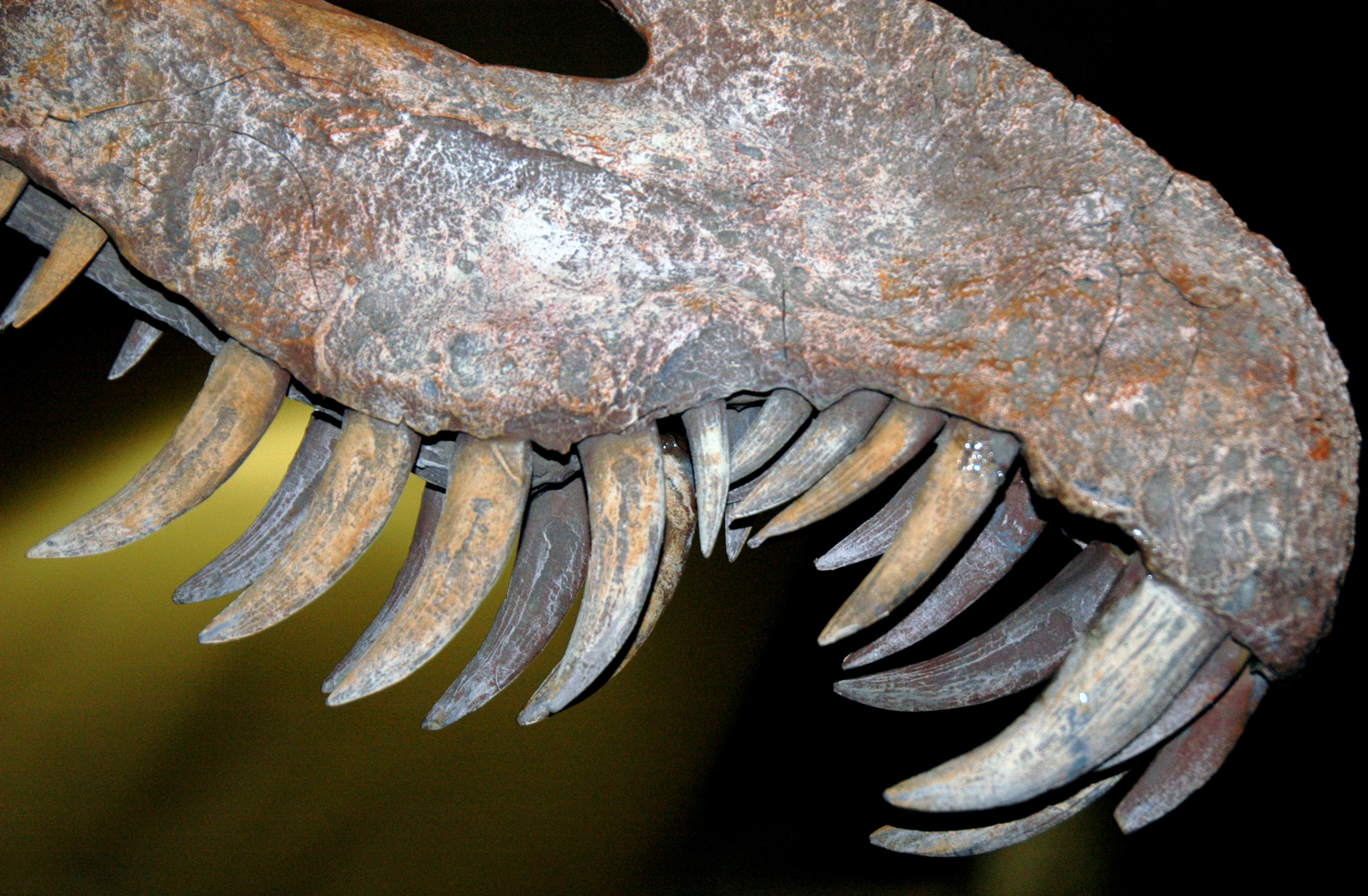
Closeup of the dentition of a cast of Suchomimus

Like most other spinosaurids, baryonychines had a very elongated skull compared to other theropods. Furthermore, even in comparison to the spinosaurines their skulls were long. Perhaps the most proportionally-lengthened skull belongs to Suchomimus. In its very crocodilian skull, there is little to no concavity or convexity from the front (premaxillae) to the back (parietals) of the skull, unlike in spinosaurines and most other theropods. Baryonychines possess reduced antorbital fenestrae in comparison to other theropods, with most of the front snout being solid bone formed by the premaxillae and maxillae. The tips of the premaxillae were expanded into a "terminal rosette" holding enlarged, recurved teeth. Behind these expansions, baryonychines featured a subnarial gap complex where dentary teeth fit into, and, further posterior, a dentary gap that the large anteriormost maxillary teeth indented. These animals also bore reduced, narrow premaxillary crests.

== Classification ==
The subfamily Baryonychinae was first implicitly named in 1986 by Alan J. Charig and Angela Milner when they named the family "Baryonychidae" to include Baryonyx. Those who name families are considered the nominal authors of the subfamilies also. The family Baryonychidae was invalidated when Baryonyx was found to be a spinosaurid. Milner stated that it was likely that Suchosaurus belonged to this subfamily as well.

In 1998, the newly described Cristatusaurus was agreed to be very closely related to, if not identical to, Baryonyx by Charig & Milner, 1986 & 1997, Sereno, 1998, and Rauhut, 2003. Later in 1998, Sereno et al. described the genus Suchomimus, and placed it in Baryonychinae along with Baryonyx. They defined the clade's distinguishing characteristics as "numerous small-sized, serrated teeth in the dentary behind the terminal rosette and deeply-keeled anterior dorsal vertebrae." By 2002, the conclusion was that the subfamily contained the genera Baryonyx, Cristatusaurus, Suchomimus, and Suchosaurus. The clade was phylogenetically defined by Holtz et al. as all taxa more closely related to Baryonyx walkeri than to Spinosaurus aegyptiacus.

In the 2012 description of Ichthyovenator, Allain et al. found it to belong to this subfamily, although almost all subsequent studies have found otherwise, placing it in Spinosaurinae.

Up until 2021, with Cristatusaurus and Suchosaurus being considered too incomplete and dubious, only the baryonychines Suchomimus and Baryonyx have been included in phylogenetic analyses, nearly always finding them to be sister genera in Baryonychinae, such as in the analysis performed by Arden et al. in 2018, shown below.

- Spinosauridae
  - Praia das Aguncheiras taxon
  - Baryonychinae
    - Baryonyx walkeri
    - Suchomimus tenerensis
  - Spinosaurinae
    - Siamosaurus suteethorni
    - - Eumeralla taxon
      - - Ichthyovenator laosensis
        - - Irritator challengeri
          - Oxalaia quilombensis
          - Spinosaurini
            - Gara Samani taxon
            - Sigilmassasaurus brevicollis
            - Spinosaurus aegyptiacus

In 2021, Chris Barker, Hone, Darren Naish, Andrea Cau, Lockwood, Foster, Clarkin, Schneider, and Gostling described two new spinosaurid species, Ceratosuchops inferodios and Riparovenator milnerae, and placed them well-supportedly in Baryonychinae. They placed them within the newly created tribe Ceratosuchopsini alongside Suchomimus. Barker et al. diagnosed three autapomorphies to distinguish the clade: "1. postorbital facet of frontal dorsoventrally thick (height more than 40% of length) and excavated by a deep, longitudinal slot; 2. well-defined and strongly curved anterior margins of supratemporal fossa; 3. occipital surface of the basisphenoid collateral oval scars excavated." Members of this clade range in length from 7.7 to 9.5 m (25.3 to 31 ft). The results of their Bayesian analysis appear below:

- - Megalosauridae
  - Spinosauridae
    - Vallibonavenatrix
    - - Baryonychinae
        - - Iberospinus
          - Baryonyx
        - Ceratosuchopsini
          - Suchomimus
          - - Riparovenator
            - Ceratosuchops
      - Spinosaurinae
        - Camarillasaurus
        - - Ichthyovenator
          - - Irritator
            - Spinosaurini
              - Sigilmassasaurus
              - - "Spinosaurus B" (=?cf. Sigilmassasaurus/Spinosaurus sp.)
                - - MSNM-V4047 (=?cf. Sigilmassasaurus/Spinosaurus sp.)
                  - - FSAC-KK11888 (Spinosaurus sp.)
                    - Spinosaurus holotype

== Paleobiology ==
=== Feeding ===
Baryonychine teeth are small and recurved with little to no serrations, resembling those of crocodiles. These are considered adaptations for piscivory, as numerous recurved teeth aid in holding a struggling slippery animal within the jaws and down the throat; rather than the serrated teeth in most other theropods which are generalized for cutting and ripping flesh. Vullo et al., 2016 likened the cranial evolution and adaptations to piscivory in spinosaurids to those of the Muraenesocidae, a modern family of predatory eels with a similarly evolved skull.

Baryonyx as one of the most complete representatives of the group shows evidence of a generalist behavior. One recorded instance is the holotype of Baryonyx found with both fish as well as a juvenile iguanodontid contents within the stomach region. Another instance is pointed out by a 2016 study by the Belgian palaeontologist Christophe Hendrickx and colleagues. They found that adult spinosaurs could displace their mandibular rami (halves of the lower jaw) sideways when the jaw was depressed, which allowed the pharynx (opening that connects the mouth to the oesophagus) to be widened. This jaw-articulation is similar to that seen in pterosaurs and living pelicans, and would likewise have allowed spinosaurids to swallow large prey such as fish and other animals.

They also reported that the possible Portuguese Iberospinus (formerly seen as Baryonyx) fossils were found associated with isolated Iguanodon teeth, and listed it along with other such associations as support for opportunistic feeding behaviour in spinosaurs.
