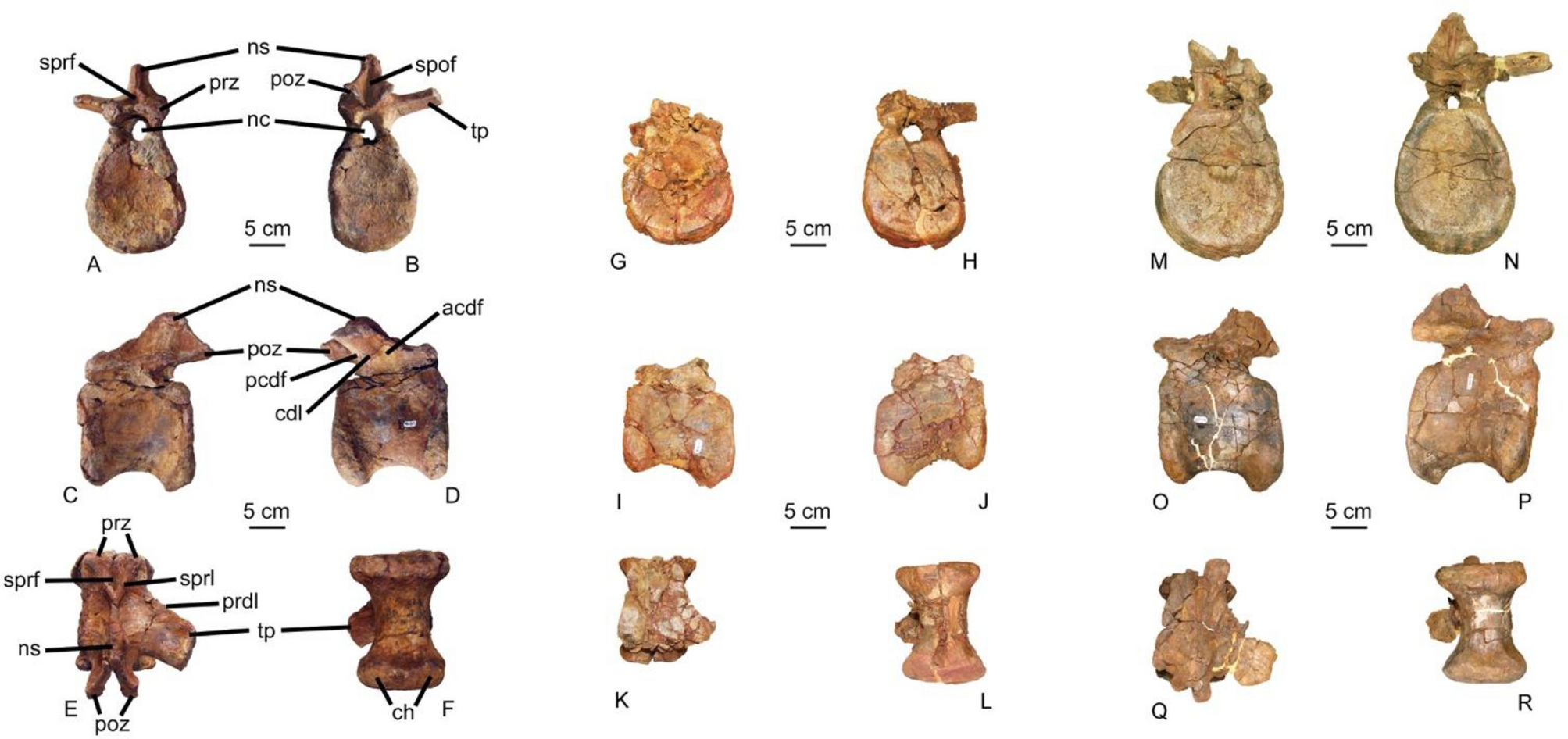
- Tail vertebrae of Protathlitis

Scientific classification
- Kingdom: Animalia
- Phylum: Chordata
- Class: Reptilia
- Clade: Dinosauria
- Clade: Saurischia
- Clade: Theropoda
- Family: †Spinosauridae
- Subfamily: †Baryonychinae
- Genus: †Protathlitis; Santos-Cubedo et al., 2023

Type species
- †Protathlitis cinctorrensis Santos-Cubedo et al., 2023

= Protathlitis =

Protathlitis Temporal range: Early Cretaceous (Barremian), 129.4–125 Ma

Genus of spinosaurid theropod dinosaur

Protathlitis (meaning "champion") is a potentially dubious and chimeric genus of theropod dinosaur from the Early Cretaceous (Barremian) Arcillas de Morella Formation of Castellón, Spain. The type and only species is Protathlitis cinctorrensis, known from a partial skeleton. It was originally identified as a basal member of the Baryonychinae. If a spinosaurid identity of the material is correct, its discovery, as well as those of the spinosaurids Camarillasaurus, Iberospinus, Riojavenatrix, and the contemporary Vallibonavenatrix shows that the Iberian Peninsula held a diverse assemblage of these theropods during the Early Cretaceous.

== Discovery and naming ==
The holotype remains, the maxillary fragment 8ANA-109 and caudal vertebrae 3ANA83, 4ANA43, 4ANA69, 4ANA76, and 5ANA78, were recovered from the ANA site of the Arcillas de Morella Formation, which was discovered in 1998 and remained unexplored until 2002. A tooth, 4ANA-11, possibly from the left mandible or right maxilla, was also referred.

The remains were described as a new genus and species of spinosaurid in 2023, Protathlitis cinctorrensis. The genus name, "Protathlitis", is Greek for "champion", and is dedicated to the 2020–21 UEFA Europa League won by Villareal C.F. and in light of the club's centenary in 2023. The specific name, "cinctorrensis", honors Cinctorres, the town where the remains were discovered.

In 2024, Montealegre, Castillo-Visa & Sellés tentatively assigned specimen IPS919, a nearly complete tooth including a partial root from the Arcillas de Morella Formation, to cf. Protathlitis.

== Classification ==
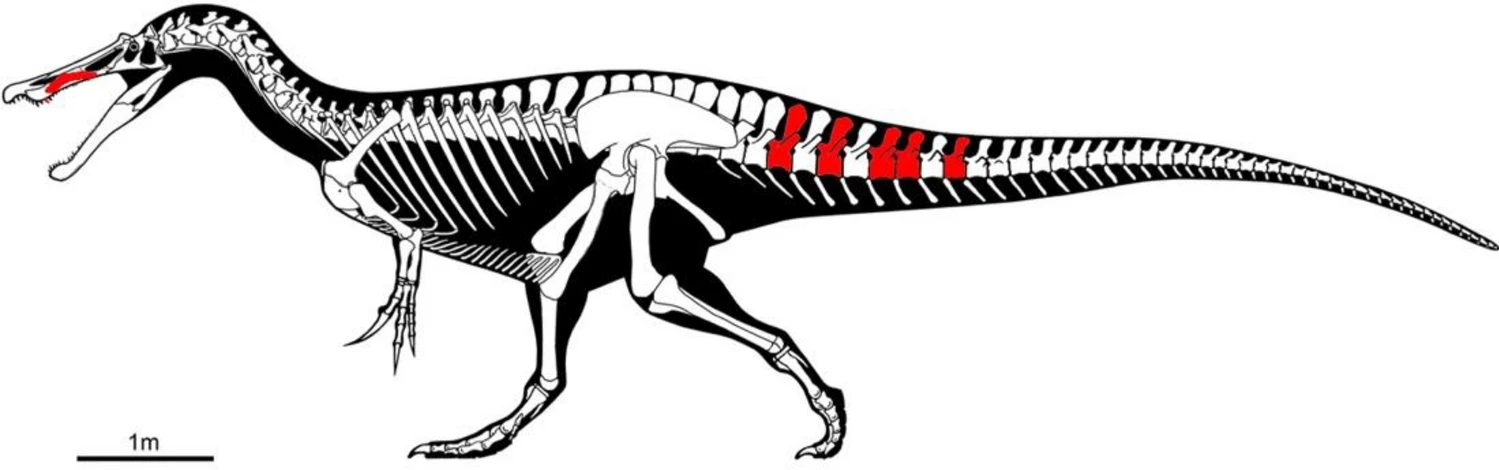
Skeletal diagram of the related Baryonyx, showing the known bones of Protathlitis in red

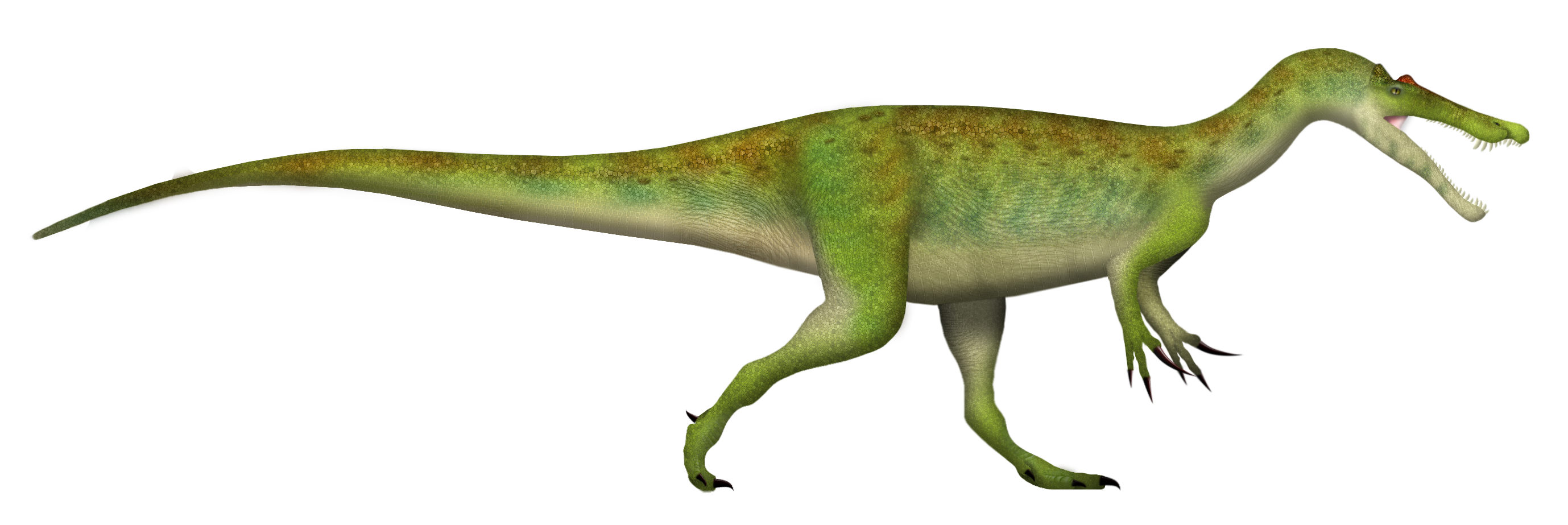
Speculative life restoration as a spinosaurid

Santos-Cubedo et al. (2023) performed a phylogenetic analysis, placing Protathlitis as the basalmost member the Baryonychinae. Their results are shown in the cladogram below:

- Spinosauridae
  - Camarillasaurus
  - - Baryonychinae
      - Protathlitis
      - - Baryonyx
        - - Ceratosuchops
          - Suchomimus
    - Spinosaurinae
      - Ichthyovenator
      - - Vallibonavenatrix
        - - Spinosaurus
          - Irritator

In their 2025 reassessment of Camarillasaurus, Rauhut and colleagues noted that the type material was likely chimeric, with many bones deviating from the expected morphology of spinosaurids and even theropods in general. They also noted the lack of evidence that the remains all belonged to the same individual or species. As such, they regarded it as a probable nomen dubium.

== Palaeoenvironment ==
Protathlitis hails from the Arcillas de Morella Formation, which has been dated to the Barremian stage of the Early Cretaceous period, between 129.4 and 125 million years ago. It coexisted in this environment with other dinosaurs including the ornithischians Iguanodon bernissartensis and Morelladon beltrani, an indeterminate sauropod, and the fellow spinosaurid Vallibonavenatrix.
