= Eodortoka =

Eodortoka Temporal range: Aptian

Scientific classification
- Kingdom: Animalia
- Phylum: Chordata
- Class: Reptilia
- Order: Testudines
- Family: †Dortokidae
- Genus: †Eodortoka
- Species: †E. morellana

Binomial name
- †Eodortoka morellana Pérez-García et al., 2014

Eodortoka is an extinct genus of dortokid that lived during the Aptian stage of the Early Cretaceous epoch.

== Distribution ==
Eodortoka morellana is known from the Arcillas de Morella Formation of Spain.
