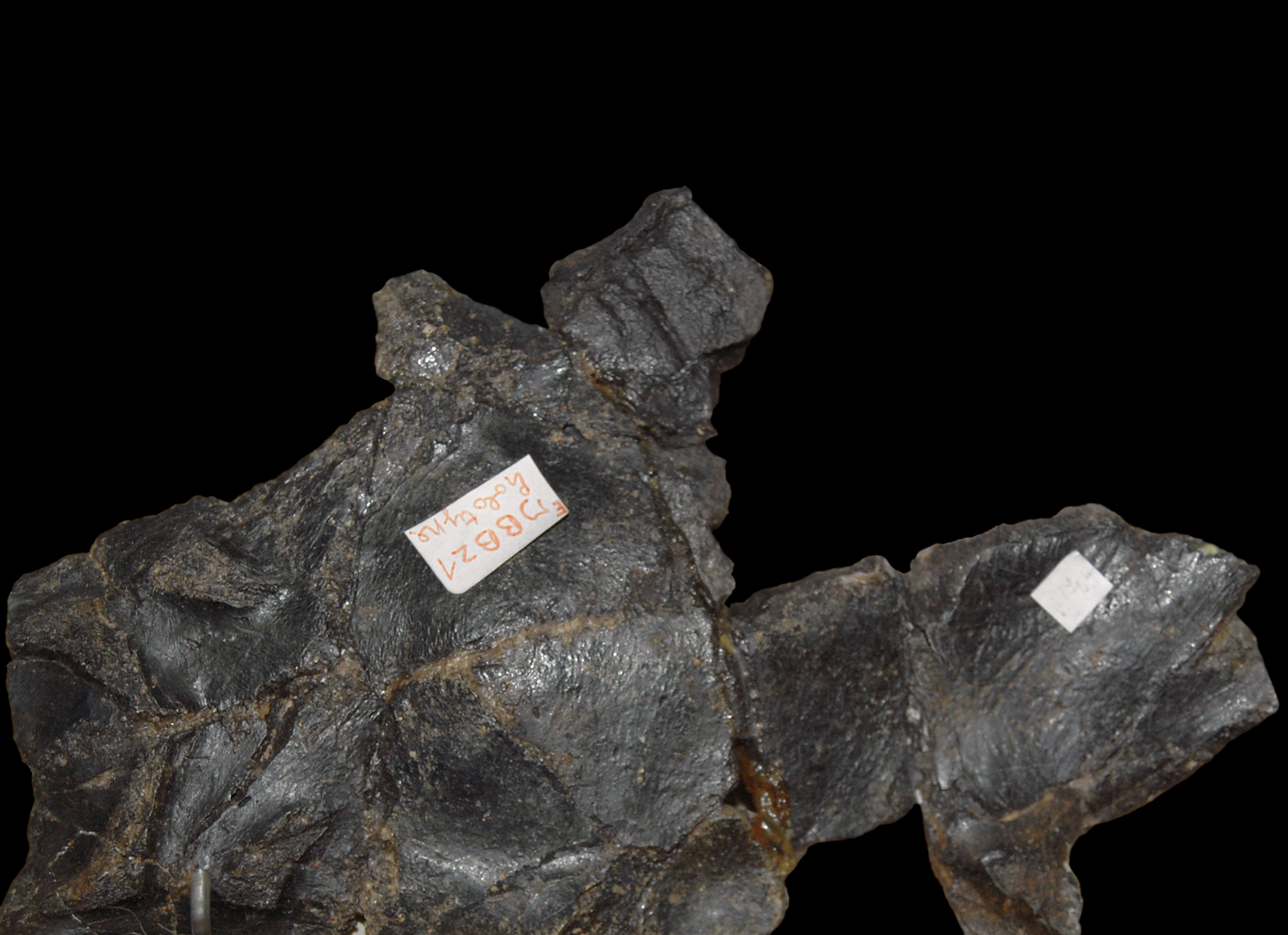
- Fragmentary plastron of Ronella

Scientific classification
- Kingdom: Animalia
- Phylum: Chordata
- Class: Reptilia
- Order: Testudines
- Clade: Pan-Pleurodira
- Family: †Dortokidae; Lapparent de Broin and Murelaga, 1999

Genera
- Dortoka Lapparent de Broin and Murelaga, 1999; Eodortoka Pérez-García, Gasulla, and Ortega 2014.; Ronella Lapparent de Broin in Gheerbrant et al. 1999

= Dortokidae =

Dortokidae Temporal range: Hauterivian–Paleocene

Extinct family of turtles

Dortokidae is an extinct family of freshwater pan-pleurodiran turtles, known from the Cretaceous and Paleocene of Europe. Only four species have been named, but indeterminate fossils show that they were abundant across western and eastern-central Europe during the Cretaceous. The family is only known from postcranial remains.

== Genera ==
- Eodortoka Pérez-García, Gasulla, and Ortega 2014 Wessex Formation, United Kingdom Early Cretaceous (Hauterivian-Barremian) Arcillas de Morella Formation, Spain, Early Cretaceous (Aptian)
- Dortoka Lapparent de Broin and Murelaga, 1999 Laño site, Spain, (probably also present in southern France) Late Cretaceous (Campanian-Maastrichtian) Sînpetru Formation, Romania, Late Cretaceous (Maastrichtian)
- Ronella Lapparent de Broin in Gheerbrant et al. 1999 Jibou Formation, Romania Paleocene (Thanetian) (alternatively considered a species of Dortoka)

An indeterminate dortokid is also known from the Hauterivian-Barremian aged El Castellar Formation in Spain and the Campanian aged Grünbach Formation of Austria.
