= Arcillas de Morella Formation =

Geologic formation in Spain

- Stratigraphic range: Barremian
- Type: Geological formation
- Underlies: Xert Formation
- Overlies: Artoles Formation

Lithology
- Primary: Sandstone, clay
- Other: Marl, limestone, siltstone, conglomerate

Location
- Region: Europe
- Country: Spain

Type section
- Named for: Morella, Castellón
- Named by: Canérot et al.
- Year defined: 1982
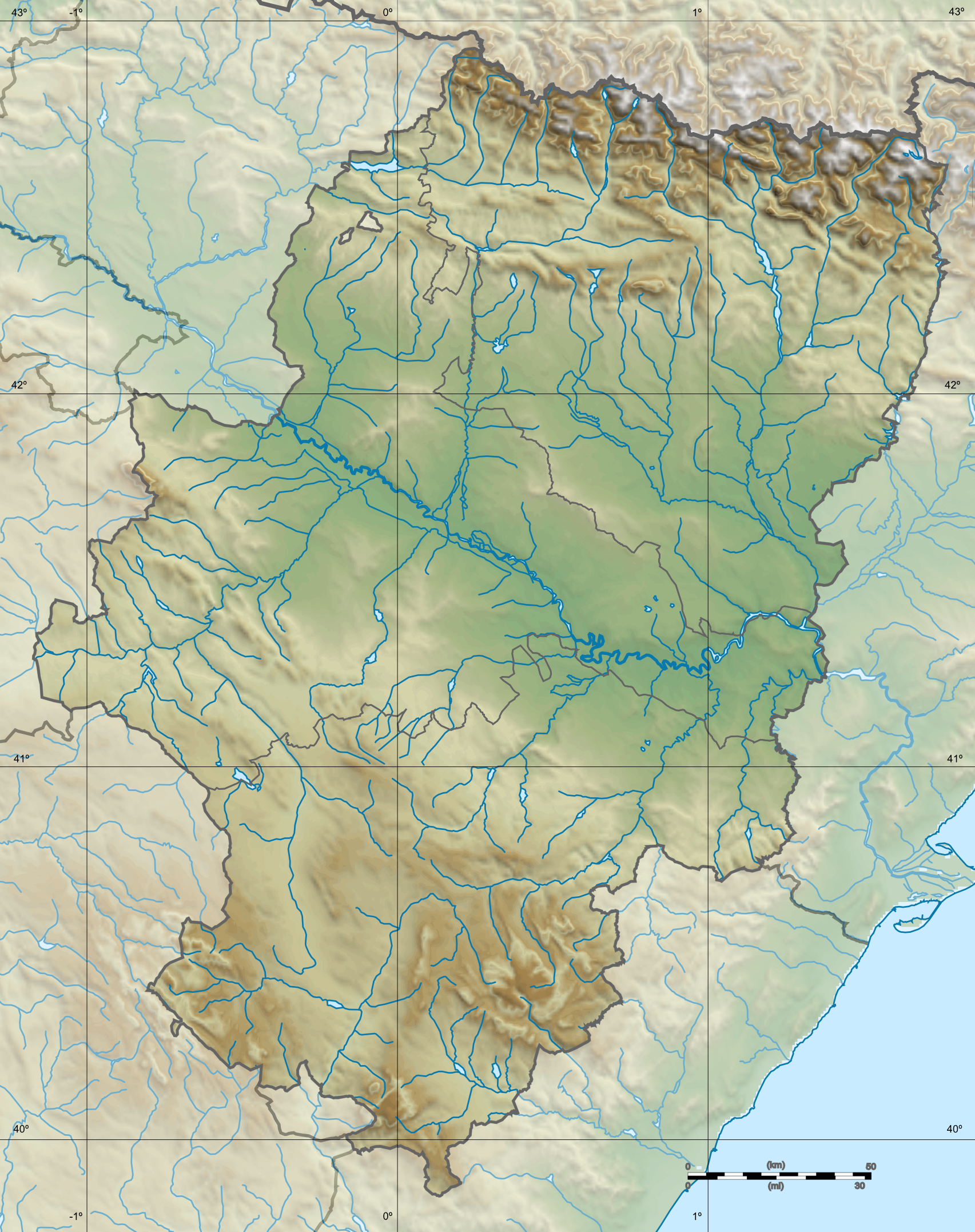
- Arcillas de Morella Formation (Spain) Arcillas de Morella Formation (Aragon)

The Arcillas de Morella Formation is a geological formation in Spain whose strata date back to the Barremian stage of the Early Cretaceous. Dinosaur remains are among the fossils that have been recovered from the formation.

== Geology ==
The formation was formally named and defined by Canérot and colleagues in 1982. The formation predominantly consists of red clays and continental sandstones, with some marine intercalations.

== Vertebrate paleofauna ==
=== Dinosaurs ===
Dinosaurs of the Arcillas de Morella Formation
Taxa	Species	Notes	Images
Hypsilophodon			Hypsilophodon Iguanodon Mantellisaurus Protathlitis Vallibonavenatrix
Iguanodon	I. bernissartensis	An iguanodonian dinosaur	Hypsilophodon Iguanodon Mantellisaurus Protathlitis Vallibonavenatrix
Mantellisaurus	M. cf. atherfieldensis	An iguanodontian dinosaur	Hypsilophodon Iguanodon Mantellisaurus Protathlitis Vallibonavenatrix
Morelladon	Morelladon beltrani	An iguanodontian dinosaur	Hypsilophodon Iguanodon Mantellisaurus Protathlitis Vallibonavenatrix
Baryonychinae	Indeterminate remains		Hypsilophodon Iguanodon Mantellisaurus Protathlitis Vallibonavenatrix
cf. Carcharodontosauridae	Indeterminate remains	An anterior caudal centrum belonging to an immature individual	Hypsilophodon Iguanodon Mantellisaurus Protathlitis Vallibonavenatrix
Garumbatitan	G. morellensis	A somphospondylan sauropod	Hypsilophodon Iguanodon Mantellisaurus Protathlitis Vallibonavenatrix
Polacanthus	P. sp	A polacanthine nodosaurid ankylosaur	Hypsilophodon Iguanodon Mantellisaurus Protathlitis Vallibonavenatrix
Protathlitis	P. cinctorrensis	A spinosaurid theropod	Hypsilophodon Iguanodon Mantellisaurus Protathlitis Vallibonavenatrix
Titanosauriformes	Indeterminate	At least two distinct taxa, including a somphospondylan	Hypsilophodon Iguanodon Mantellisaurus Protathlitis Vallibonavenatrix
Vallibonavenatrix	V. cani	A spinosaurid theropod	Hypsilophodon Iguanodon Mantellisaurus Protathlitis Vallibonavenatrix

=== Turtles ===
Turtles of the Arcillas de Morella Formation
Taxa	Species	Notes	Images
Brodiechelys	B. royoi	A xinjiangchelyid turtle	
Eodortoka	E. morellana	A dortokid turtle	

=== Plesiosaurs ===
Plesiosaurs of the Arcillas de Morella Formation
Taxa	Presence	Notes	Images
Leptocleididae			

== Correlation ==
Early Cretaceous stratigraphy of Iberia
Ma	Age	Paleomap \ Basins	Cantabrian	Olanyà	Cameros	Maestrazgo	Oliete	Galve	Morella	South Iberian	Pre-betic	Lusitanian
100	Cenomanian		La Cabana	Sopeira	Utrillas		Mosquerela					Caranguejeira
100	Cenomanian		Altamira	Sopeira	Utrillas							Caranguejeira
100	Cenomanian		Eguino	Sopeira	Utrillas							Caranguejeira
125	Albian		Ullaga - Balmaseda	Lluçà	Utrillas					Traiguera		Caranguejeira
125	Albian		Monte Grande	Lluçà	Escucha		Escucha			Jijona		Caranguejeira
125	Albian		Itxina - Miono	Lluçà	Escucha		Escucha					Caranguejeira
125	Aptian		Valmaseda - Tellamendi	Lluçà	Ol Gp. - Castrillo	Benassal	Escucha	Benassal				Olhos
125	Aptian		Valmaseda - Tellamendi	Font	En Gp. - Leza	Morella/Oliete	Oliete	Villaroya	Morella	Capas; Rojas		Almargem
125	Aptian		Patrocinio - Ernaga	Senyús	En Gp. - Jubela	Forcall			Morella	Villaroya	Upper; Bedoulian	Figueira
125	Barremian		Vega de Pas	Cabó	Abejar	Xert	Alacón	Xert	Morella	Huérguina	Upper; Bedoulian	Assises
125	Barremian		Vega de Pas	Prada	Abejar	Artoles			Morella	Collado	Moutonianum	Papo Seco
125	Barremian		Vega de Pas	Rúbies	Tera Gp. - Golmayo	Alacón/Blesa	Blesa	Camarillas	Mirambel	Collado	Moutonianum	Papo Seco
150	Hauterivian		Vega de Pas	Rúbies	Ur Gp. - Pinilla	Llacova	Blesa	Castellar	Tera Gp. - Pinilla	Villares		Porto da Calada
150	Hauterivian		Vega de Pas	Rúbies	Ur Gp. - Pinilla	Llacova	hiatus	Castellar		Villares		Porto da Calada
150	Hauterivian		Vega de Pas	Rúbies	Ur Gp. - Pinilla	Huerva	hiatus	Castellar	Gaita			Porto da Calada
150	Valanginian		Villaro	Rúbies	Ur Gp. - Larriba	Huerva	hiatus	Castellar	Ped Gp. - Hortigüela			Porto da Calada
150	Valanginian		Villaro	Rúbies	Ped Gp. - Hortigüela	Huerva	hiatus	Castellar	Ped Gp. - Piedrahita			Porto da Calada
150	Valanginian		Villaro	Rúbies	Peñacoba	Huerva	hiatus	Galve	Ped Gp. - Piedrahita	Miravetes		Porto da Calada
150	Berriasian		Cab Gp. - Arcera	Rúbies	Valdeprado	hiatus	hiatus	Alfambra	Ped Gp. - Piedrahita	Miravetes		Porto da Calada
150	Berriasian		Cab Gp. - Arcera		TdL Gp. - Rupelo	hiatus	hiatus	Arzobispo	hiatus	Tollo		Porto da Calada
150	Berriasian		Cab Gp. - Arcera		On Gp. - Huérteles; Sierra Matute	hiatus	hiatus	Arzobispo	hiatus	Tollo		Porto da Calada
150	Tithonian		Lastres		Tera Gp. - Magaña	hiatus	Higuereles		hiatus	Tera Gp. - Magaña		Lourinhã
150	Tithonian		Lastres		Tera Gp. - Magaña	hiatus	Higuereles		Arzobispo	Tera Gp. - Magaña		Lourinhã
150	Tithonian		Lastres		Ágreda	hiatus	Higuereles		Arzobispo	Tera Gp. - Magaña		Lourinhã
Legend		Major fossiliferous, oofossiliferous, ichnofossiliferous, coproliferous, minor formation										

== See also ==
- List of dinosaur-bearing rock formations
