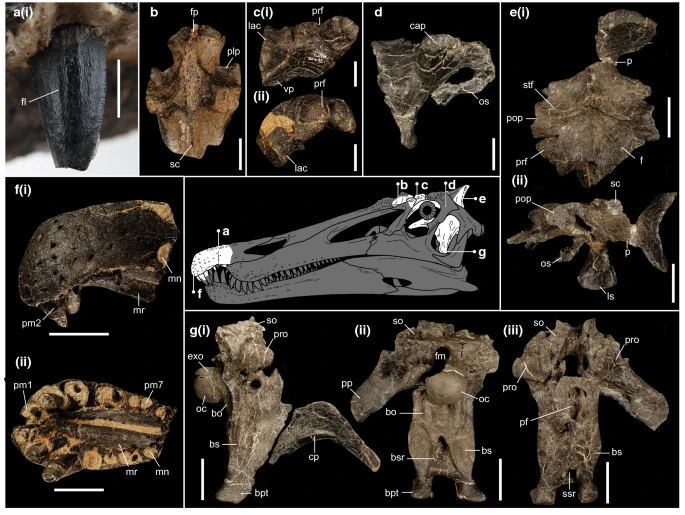
- Holotype skull fragments

Scientific classification
- Kingdom: Animalia
- Phylum: Chordata
- Class: Reptilia
- Clade: Dinosauria
- Clade: Saurischia
- Clade: Theropoda
- Family: †Spinosauridae
- Clade: †Ceratosuchopsini
- Genus: †Riparovenator; Barker et al., 2021

Type species
- †Riparovenator milnerae Barker et al., 2021

= Riparovenator =

Riparovenator Temporal range: Barremian, 125 Ma

Genus of baryonychine spinosaur from the Early Cretaceous

Riparovenator ("riverbank hunter") is a genus of baryonychine spinosaurid dinosaur from the Early Cretaceous (Barremian) period of Britain. The genus contains a single species, Riparovenator milnerae.

== Discovery and naming ==
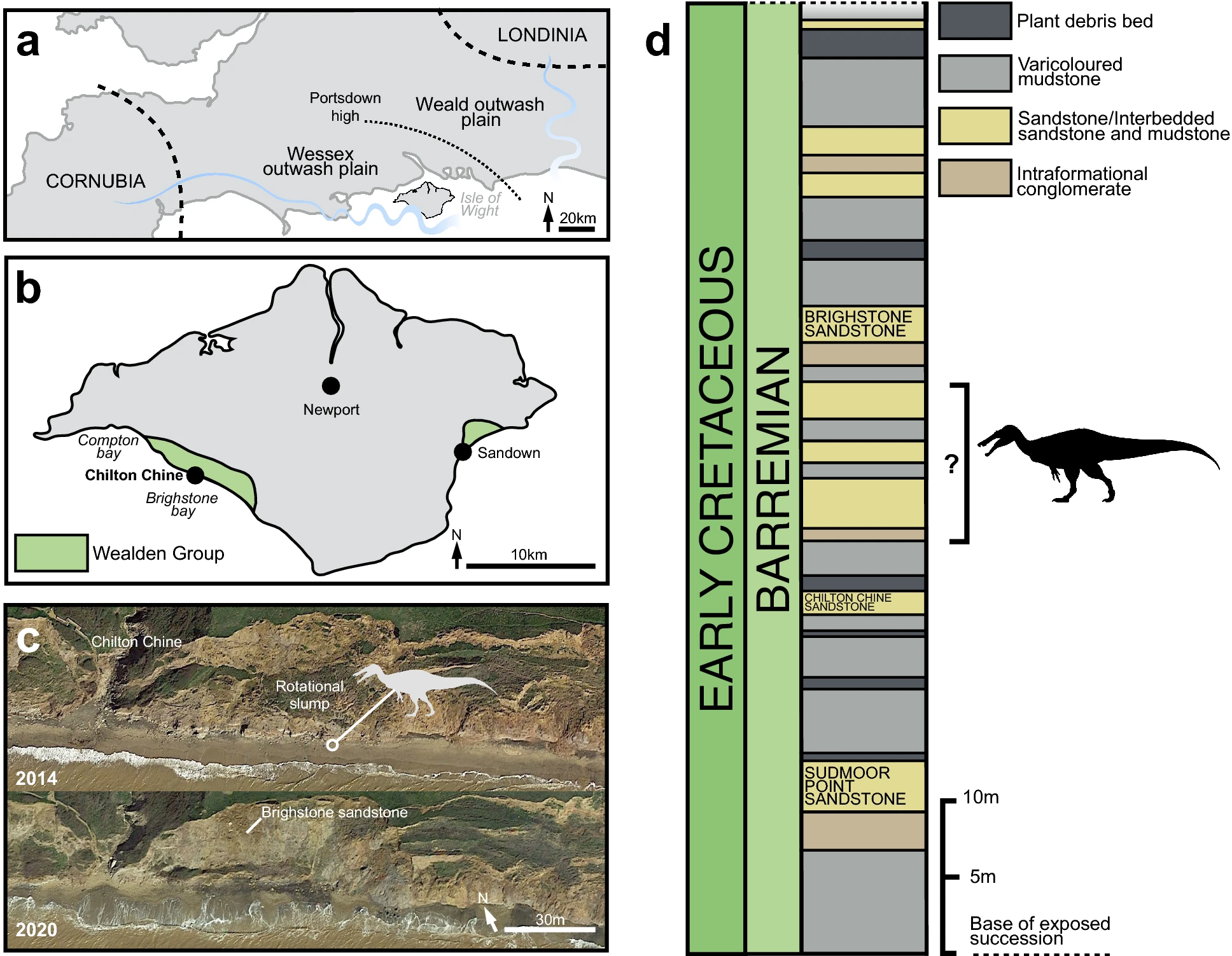
Locality information and stratigraphy of Chilton Chine

Between 2013 and 2017, spinosaurid fossils were uncovered at the beach near the Chilton Chine before being brought to Dinosaur Isle. Such remains had historically been referred to Baryonyx but were understood later to represent two new species.

The holotype remains of this taxon consist of IWCMS 2014.95.6 (premaxillary bodies), IWCMS 2014.96.1, 2; 2020.448.1, 2 (a disarticulated braincase), and IWCMS 2014.96.3 (a partial lacrimal and prefrontal). Referred remains include a posterior nasal fragment (IWCMS 2014.95.7) and a caudal axial series of twenty-two vertebrae (IWCMS 2020.447.1-39), representing around fifty individual bones in total. All of the material was recovered from rocks in the Chilton Chine of the Wessex Formation.

In 2021, the type species Riparovenator milnerae was named and described by a team of palaeontologists including Chris T. Barker, David W. E. Hone, Darren Naish, and others. The generic name is derived from the Latin rīpārius, "of the river bank", and vēnātor, "hunter". The specific name honors Angela Milner, deceased in August 2021.

== Classification ==
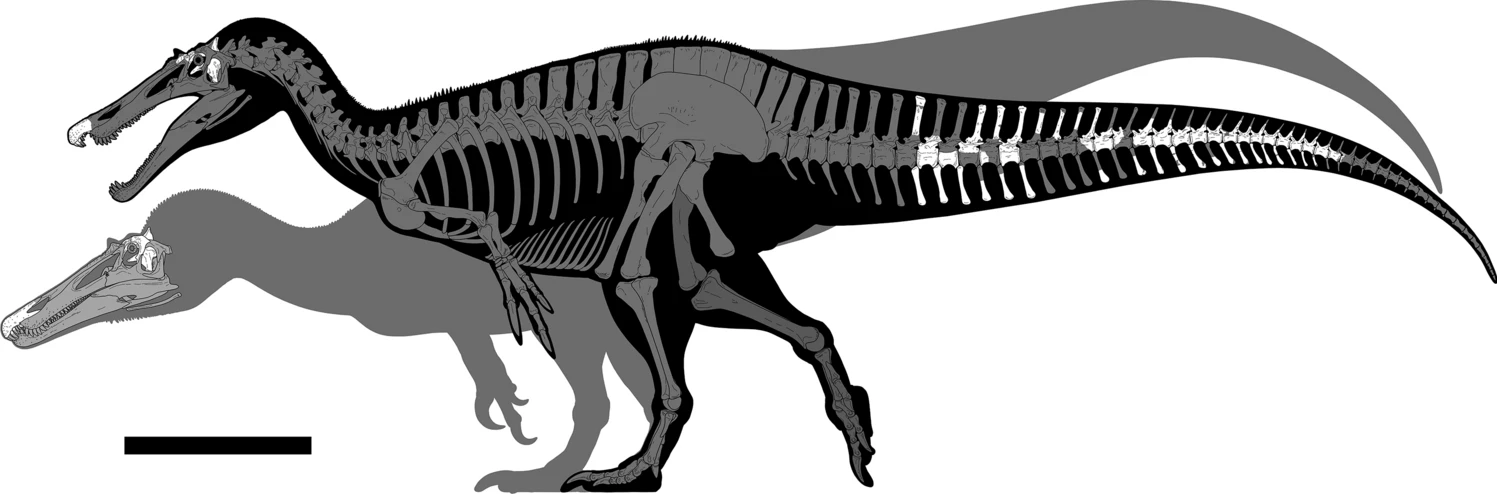
Diagram by Dan Folkes showing known material of Riparovenator (front) and Ceratosuchops (rear)

In their phylogenetic analysis, Barker et al. (2021) recovered Ceratosuchops within the Baryonychinae, as the sister taxon to the coeval Riparovenator. They are, in turn, in a clade containing Suchomimus, which they name Ceratosuchopsini.

- Baryonychinae
  - - ML1190 (Iberospinus)
    - Baryonyx
  - Ceratosuchopsini
    - Suchomimus
    - - Riparovenator
      - Ceratosuchops

In 2022, Sereno and colleagues tentatively combined Ceratosuchops and Riparovenator into a single taxonomic unit for their phylogenetic analysis. They reason that the different features between the two taxa could be attributed to individual variation, citing the cranial variation present in specimens of Allosaurus fragilis. Some of their supposed distinguishing features are also seen in parts of the braincase of Suchomimus, their closest relative. The results of their phylogenetic analysis (with Ceratosuchops and Riparovenator scored together) yielded similar results to those of Barker et al. (2021), with the Wessex baryonychine fossils recovered as the sister taxon to Suchomimus.

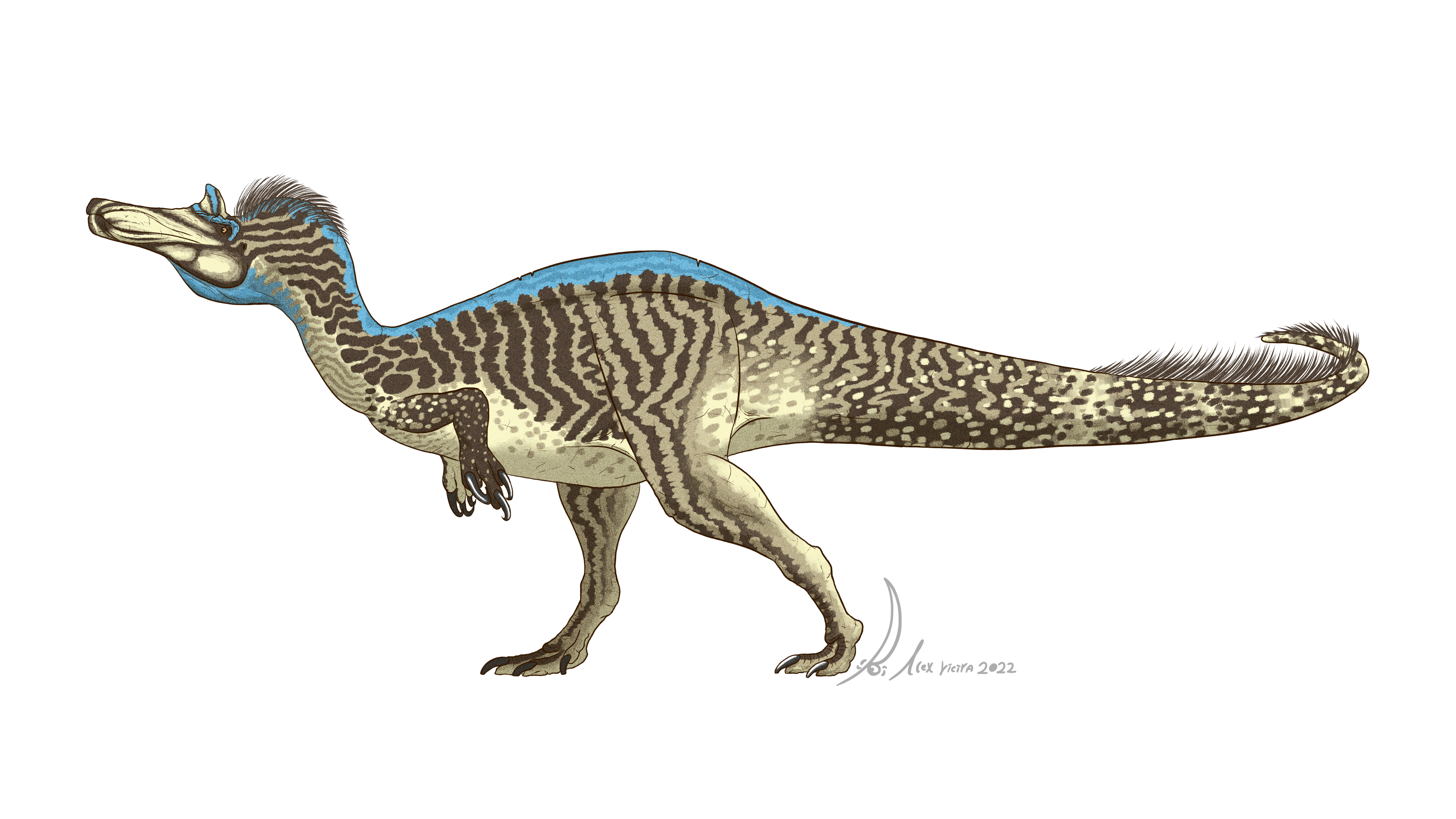
Life restoration

- Spinosauridae
  - Camarillasaurus
  - - Baryonychinae
      - Baryonyx
      - Ceratosuchopsini
        - Ceratosuchops (+Riparovenator)
        - Suchomimus
    - Spinosaurinae
      - Ichthyovenator
      - - Vallibonavenatrix
        - - Spinosaurus
          - Irritator

== Palaeoecology ==
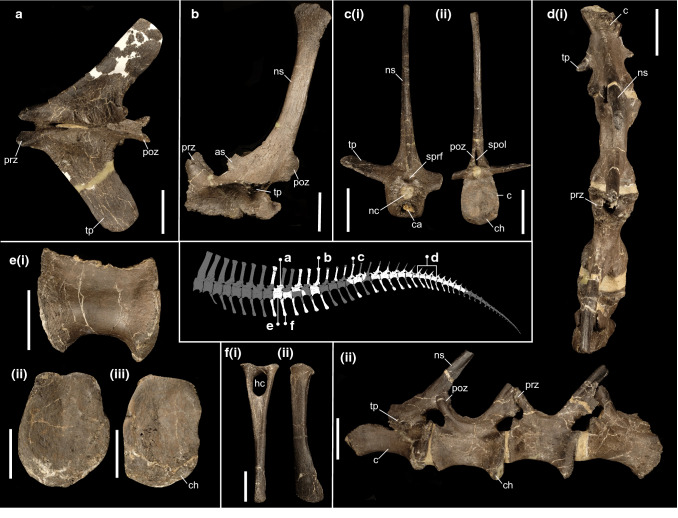
Referred caudal material

Riparovenator lived in a dry Mediterranean habitat in the Wessex Formation, where rivers were home to riparian galleries. Like most spinosaurids, it would have fed on aquatic prey as well as other terrestrial prey in these areas, such as fish, small turtles, young crocodiles, baby dinosaurs, and mammals.

Other dinosaurs from the Wessex Formation of the Isle of Wight the theropods Ceratosuchops, Neovenator, Eotyrannus, Aristosuchus, Thecocoelurus, Calamospondylus, and Ornithodesmus; the ornithopods Iguanodon, Hypsilophodon, and Valdosaurus; the sauropods Ornithopsis, Eucamerotus, and Chondrosteosaurus; and the ankylosaur Polacanthus. Barker and colleagues stated in 2021 that the identification of the two additional spinosaurids from the Wealden Supergroup, Riparovenator and Ceratosuchops, has implications for potential ecological separation within Spinosauridae if these and Baryonyx were contemporary and interacted. They cautioned that it is possible the Upper Weald Clay and Wessex Formations and the spinosaurids known from them were separated in time and distance.

It is generally thought that large predators occur with small taxonomic diversity in any area due to ecological demands, yet many Mesozoic assemblages include two or more sympatric theropods that were comparable in size and morphology, and this also appears to have been the case for spinosaurids. Barker and colleagues suggested that high diversity within Spinosauridae in a given area may have been the result of environmental circumstances benefiting their niche. While it has been generally assumed that only identifiable anatomical traits related to resource partitioning allowed for coexistence of large theropods, Barker and colleagues noted that this does not preclude that similar and closely related taxa could coexist and overlap in ecological requirements. Possible niche partitioning could be in time (seasonal or daily), in space (between habitats in the same ecosystems), or depending on conditions, and they could also have been separated by their choice of habitat within their regions (which may have ranged in climate).
