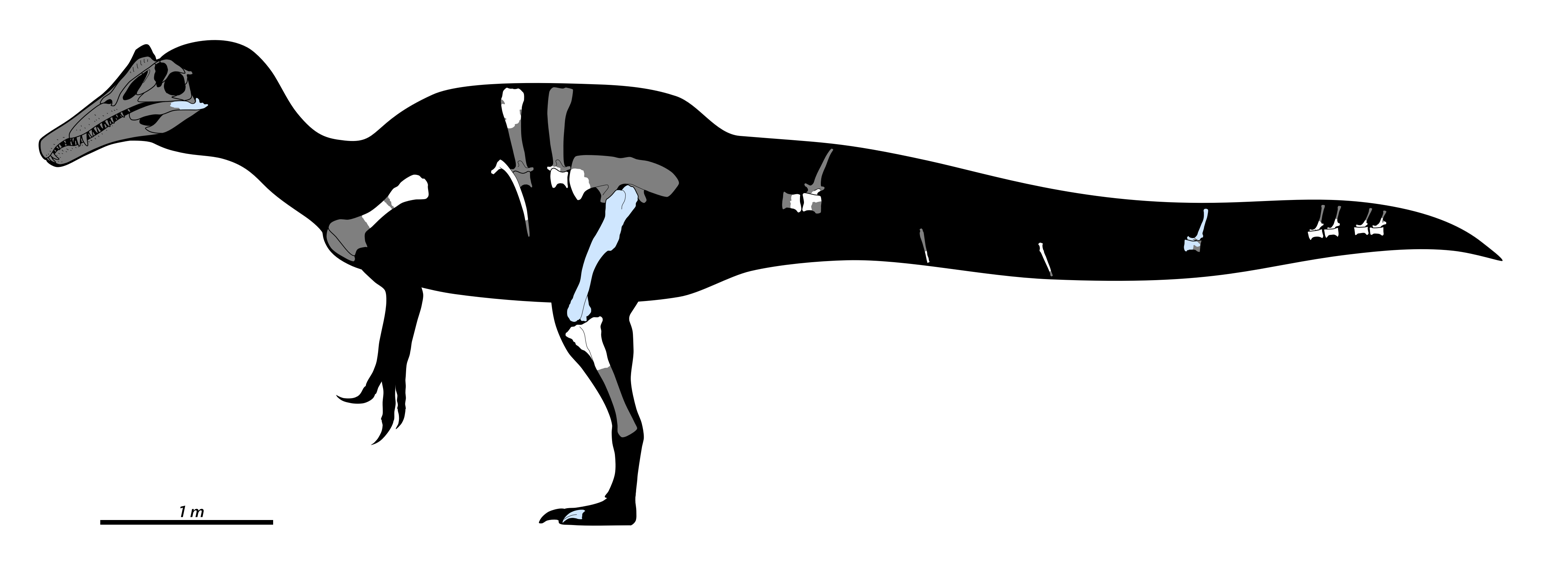
- Skeletal reconstruction as a spinosaurid

Scientific classification
- Kingdom: Animalia
- Phylum: Chordata
- Class: Reptilia
- Clade: Dinosauria
- Clade: Saurischia
- Clade: Theropoda
- Family: †Spinosauridae
- Subfamily: †Spinosaurinae
- Genus: †Camarillasaurus; Sánchez-Hernández & Benton, 2014

Type species
- †Camarillasaurus cirugedae Sánchez-Hernández & Benton, 2014

= Camarillasaurus =

Camarillasaurus Temporal range: Early Cretaceous, 130–125 Ma

Extinct genus of dinosaurs

Camarillasaurus (meaning "Camarillas lizard") is an extinct genus of spinosaurid theropod dinosaurs from the Early Cretaceous period (Barremian) of Camarillas, Teruel Province, in what is now northeastern Spain. Described in 2014, it was originally identified as a ceratosaurian theropod, but later studies suggested affinities to the Spinosauridae. Camarillasaurus is one of several spinosaurid taxa known from the Iberian peninsula, the others being Iberospinus, Protathlitis, Baryonyx, Riojavenatrix, and Vallibonavenatrix.

== Discovery and naming ==
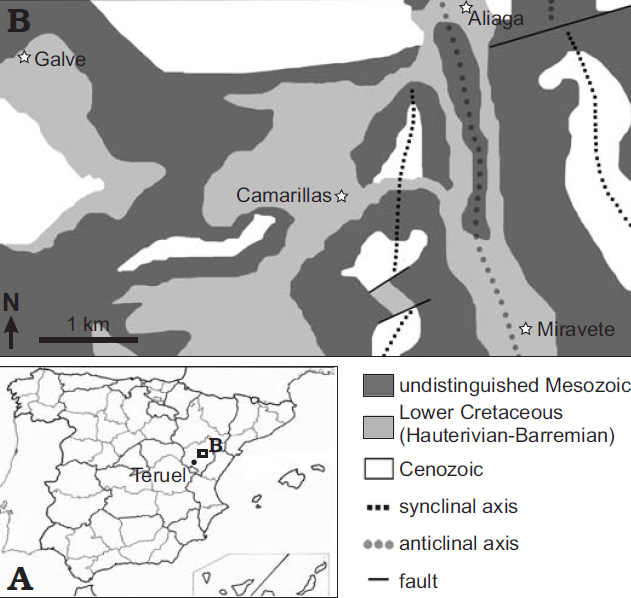
Geographic and geological setting of the Camarillas area

Fossils of Camarillasaurus were discovered in the Camarillas Formation. The type species, Camarillasaurus cirugedae, was described by palaeontologists Bárbara Sánchez-Hernández and Michael J. Benton. The generic name, "'Camarillasaurus", combines a reference to the geologic formation in which the holotype was found with the Greek "sauros", meaning "lizard". The specific name, "cirugedae", honors Pedro Cirugeda Buj, the discoverer of the holotype specimen.

== Classification ==
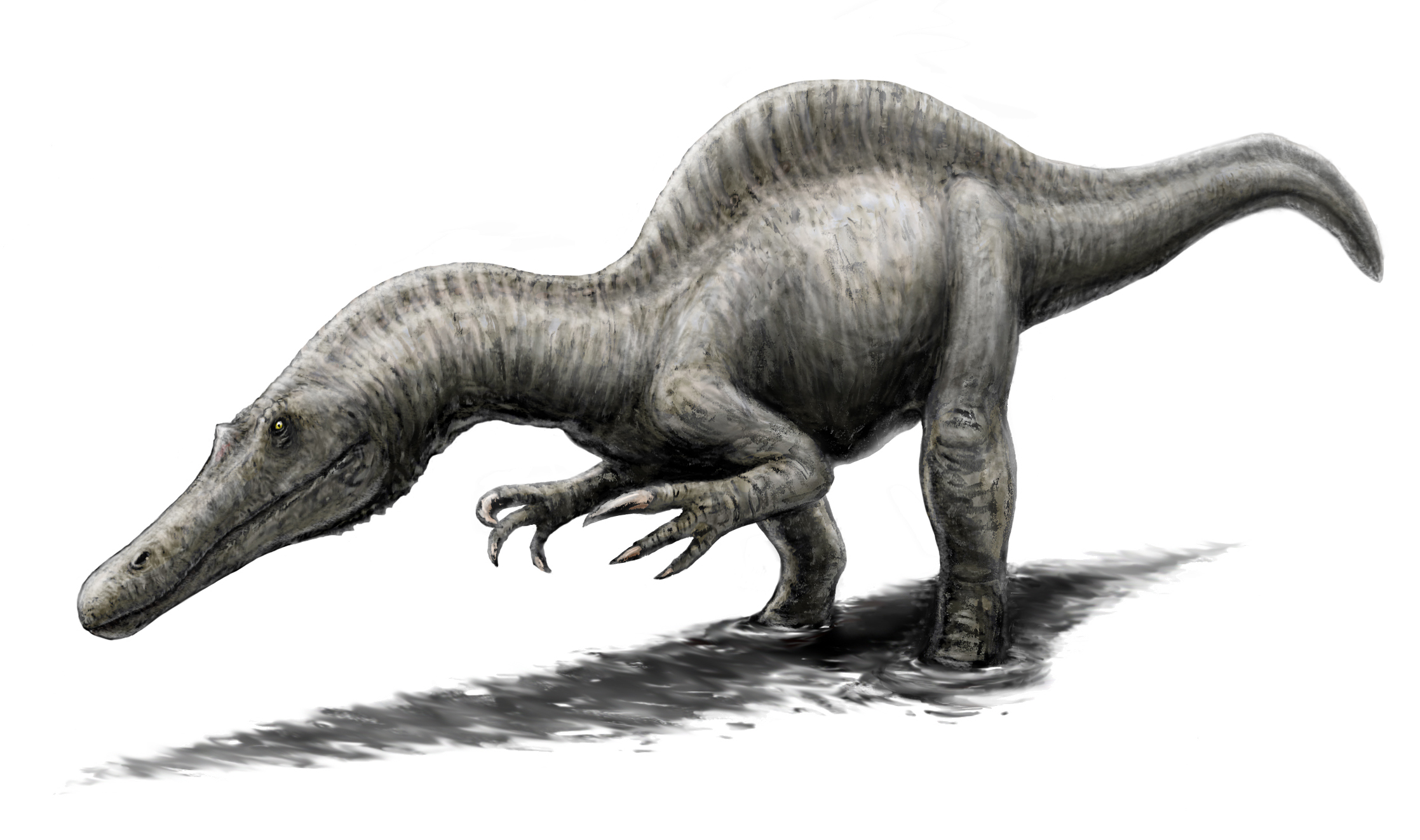
Speculative life restoration

Camarillasaurus has a complicated taxonomic history. Having originally been described as a ceratosaur, most later studies have recovered it in various positions within the Spinosauridae.

In their 2014 description of Camarillasaurus, Sánchez-Hernández & Benton considered it to be a basal ceratosaur, filling in a "gap" in the known diversity of the clade between the Late Jurassic Limusaurus and later "mid"-Cretaceous taxa. They tested its phylogenetic position using a ceratosaurian dataset, and recovered the following results:

- Ceratosauria
  - Limusaurus
  - - Camarillasaurus
    - - - Spinostropheus
        - Elaphrosaurus
      - - Ceratosaurus
        - Abelisauroidea
          - Noasauridae
            - Velocisaurus
            - - Genusaurus
              - - Noasaurus
                - - Laevisuchus
                  - Masiakasaurus
          - - Abelisauridae

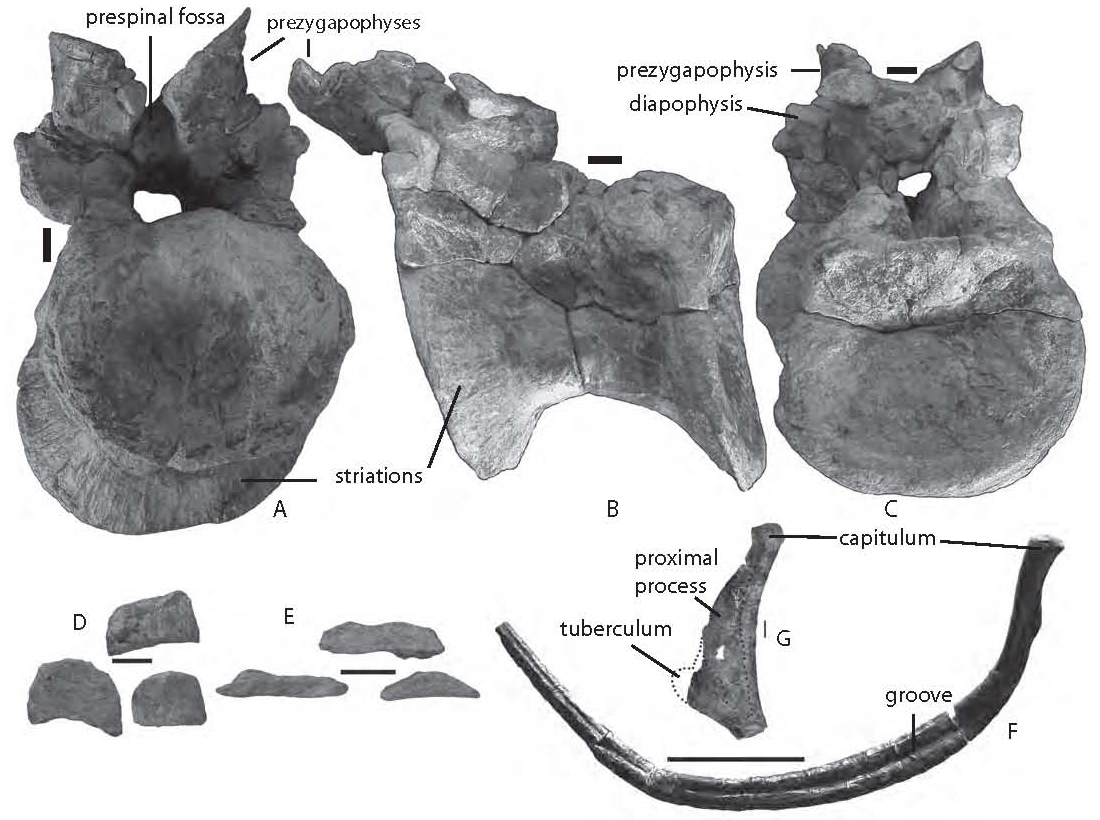
Holotype vertebra and rib fossils

However, in an abstract presented at the 2019 conference of the European Association of Vertebrate Palaeontologists, Oliver Rauhut and colleagues suggested it was more likely to be a member of the Megalosauroidea—likely the Spinosauridae—rather than a ceratosaur, based on characters of the posterior caudal vertebrae and newly excavated material at the type locality. A 2021 paper by Samathi, Sander & Chanthasit was published with a similar conclusion, noting similarities with spinosaur material from Thailand and other taxa within the family. The 2021 description of the Wessex Formation baryonychines Ceratosuchops and Riparovenator by Barker et al. recovered Camarillasaurus as the basalmost member of the Spinosaurinae, further supporting a non-ceratosaurian classification for it. In the 2023 description of Protathlitis, Santos-Cubedo et al. recovered Camarillasaurus as the basalmost member of the Spinosauridae in their phylogenetic analysis, outside of the Baryonychinae/Spinosaurinae split. They further suggested that, due to similarities in anatomy, phylogenetic position, and age, Iberospinus may be the sister taxon to Camarillasaurus, or synonymous with it.

In contrast, in a 2024 review of theropod fossils from India focusing on potential noasaurid bones, Mohabey et al. included Camarillasaurus in a phylogenetic analysis, recovering it within the ceratosaurian clade Noasauridae, as the sister taxon to a noasaurid from the Tiourarén Formation of Niger. However, their analysis did not include any spinosaurids.

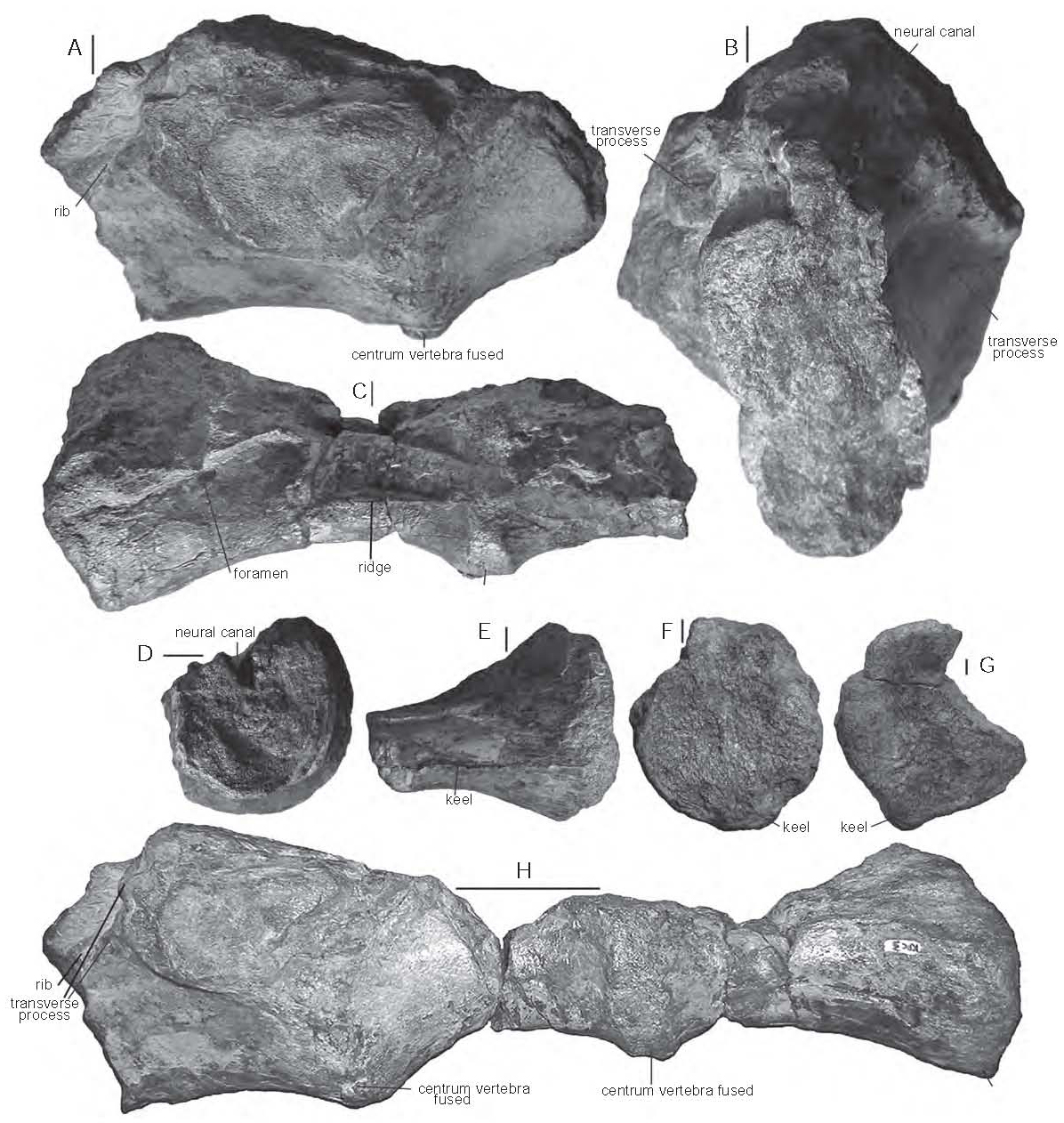
Holotype sacrum and centrum

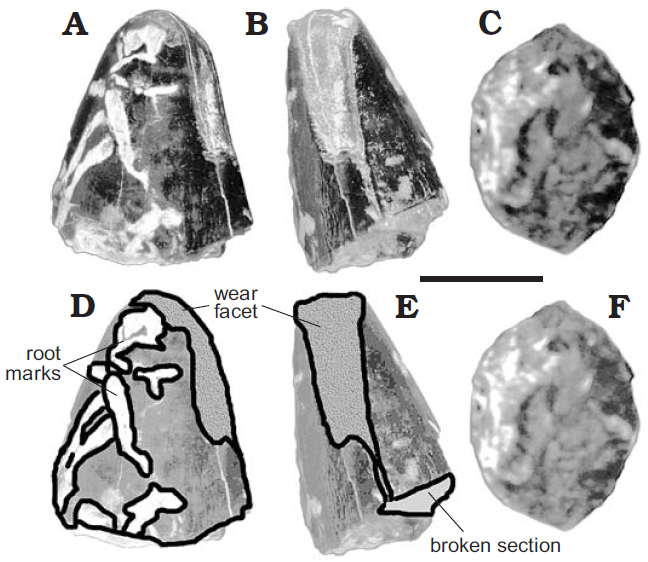
Tooth with wear-marks

In the 2024 description of the Iberian spinosaurid Riojavenatrix by Isasmendi et al., Camarillasaurus was once again recovered in the Spinosauridae, either as the basalmost spinosaurine or a basal spinosaurid as the sister to Baryonychinae and Spinosaurinae. In 2025, Rauhut and colleagues reassessed the anatomy and phylogenetic position of Camarillasaurus, finding high support for its placement within Spinosaurinae, as the sister taxon to a clade consisting of Spinosaurus and Kem Kem spinosaurid (FSAC-KK 11888; possibly Spinosaurus). The results of their reduced consensus tree (implied weighting, k=12) are shown in the cladogram below. While excluded from the full tree, Riojavenatrix was noted to be a baryonychine more derived than Baryonyx, while Angaturama, Irritator, and specimen MSNM V4047 (an isolated snout) could all be placed as spinosaurines more derived than Iberospinus.

- Spinosauridae
  - Baryonychinae
    - Baryonyx
    - - Riparovenator
      - - Suchomimus
        - Ceratosuchops
  - Spinosaurinae
    - Iberospinus
    - - Vallibonavenatrix
      - - - Sigilmassasaurus
          - Ichthyovenator
        - - Camarillasaurus
          - - FSAC-KK 11888
              (Kem Kem spinosaurid)
            - Spinosaurus
