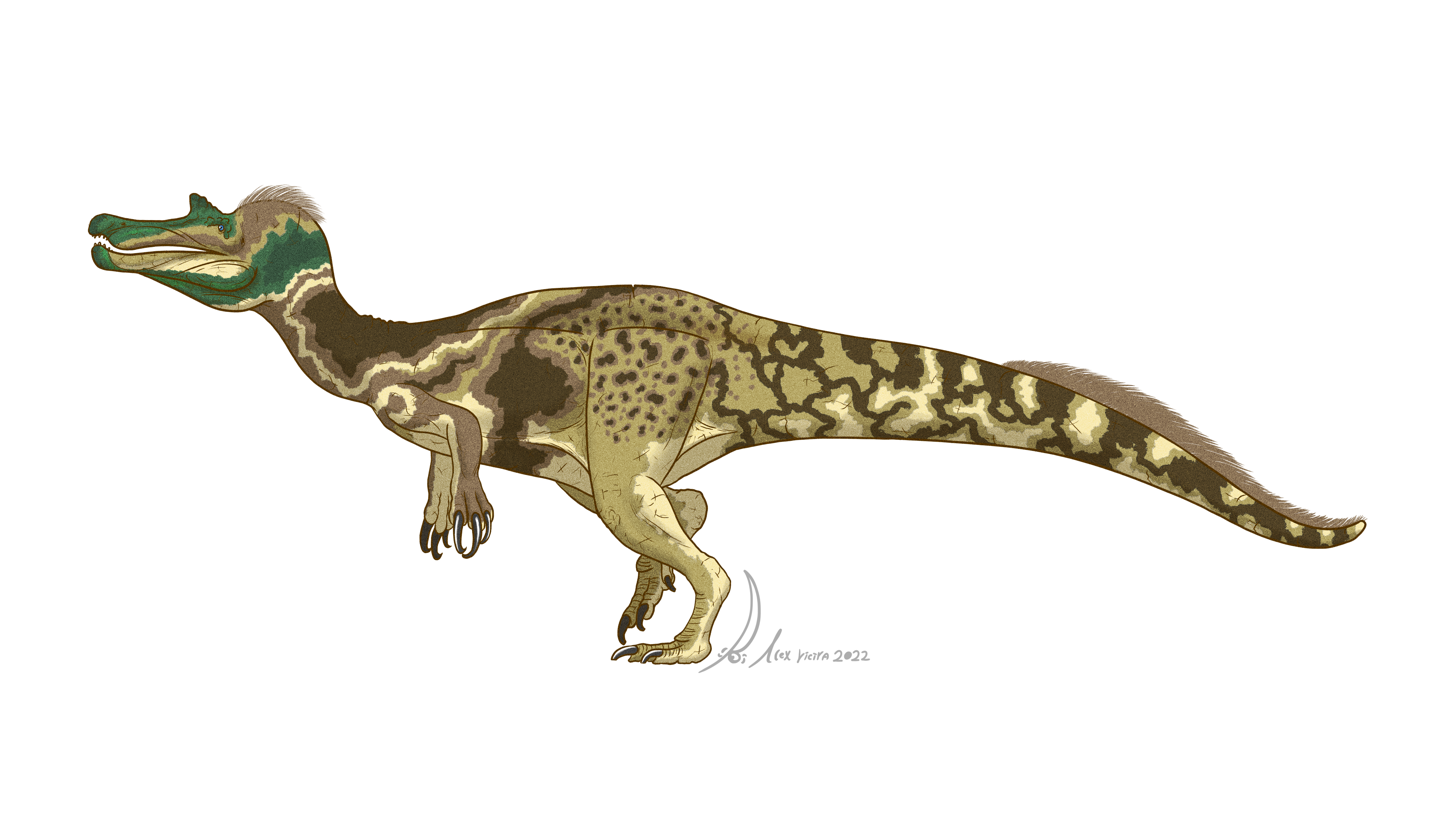
- Life restoration based on the animal's fossil remains and those of close relatives

Scientific classification
- Kingdom: Animalia
- Phylum: Chordata
- Class: Reptilia
- Clade: Dinosauria
- Clade: Saurischia
- Clade: Theropoda
- Family: †Spinosauridae
- Genus: †Vallibonavenatrix; Malafaia et al., 2020

Type species
- †Vallibonavenatrix cani Malafaia et al., 2020

= Vallibonavenatrix =

Vallibonavenatrix Temporal range: Early Cretaceous, Barremian 129.4–125 Ma

Genus of spinosaurid theropod dinosaur

Vallibonavenatrix (meaning "Vallibona huntress" after the town near where its remains were found) is a genus of spinosaurid dinosaur from the Early Cretaceous (Barremian) Arcillas de Morella Formation of Castellón, Spain. The type and only species is Vallibonavenatrix cani, known from a partial skeleton.

== Discovery and naming ==
During the late 1980s and early 1990s, amateur fossil collector Juan Cano Forner was recovering bones from various localities in Els Ports Natural Park, located in the Province of Castellón, Spain. In one of these—the Santa Águeda locality in the town of Vallibona—he excavated numerous vertebrate remains dating to the Mesozoic era, among which were dinosaur fossils. Forner housed these fossils in a private collection at Sant Mateu, which the Generalitat Valenciana acknowledged as a museographic collection in 1994. In 2007, the Spanish palaeontologist Fernando Gómez-Fernández and colleagues published a provisional description on the pelvis of a theropod from Forner's collection. Further fossils from the same specimen included a cervical (neck) vertebra, six dorsal (back) vertebrae, an almost complete sacrum, fragments of neurapophyses, four caudal (tail) vertebrae, ten partial ribs and rib fragments, three incomplete chevrons, an almost complete left ilium (main hip bone), fragments of the ventral part of a right ilium, incomplete right and left ischia (lower and rearmost hip bone), and a fragment interpreted as belonging to the proximal part of a pubis (pubic bone).

In 2020, Elisabete Malafaia and colleagues published their description of a new genus and species of spinosaurid dinosaur, Vallibonavenatrix cani, with the partial skeleton as the holotype specimen. The generic name refers to the town of Vallibona, with the Latin suffix "-venatrix", meaning "huntress". The specific name honours Cano Forner, the fossil's discoverer. Vallibonavenatrix represents the most complete spinosaurid specimen recovered from the Iberian Peninsula. Other Iberian spinosaurids include Iberospinus, Camarillasaurus, Protathlitis, and Riojavenatrix.

== Description ==
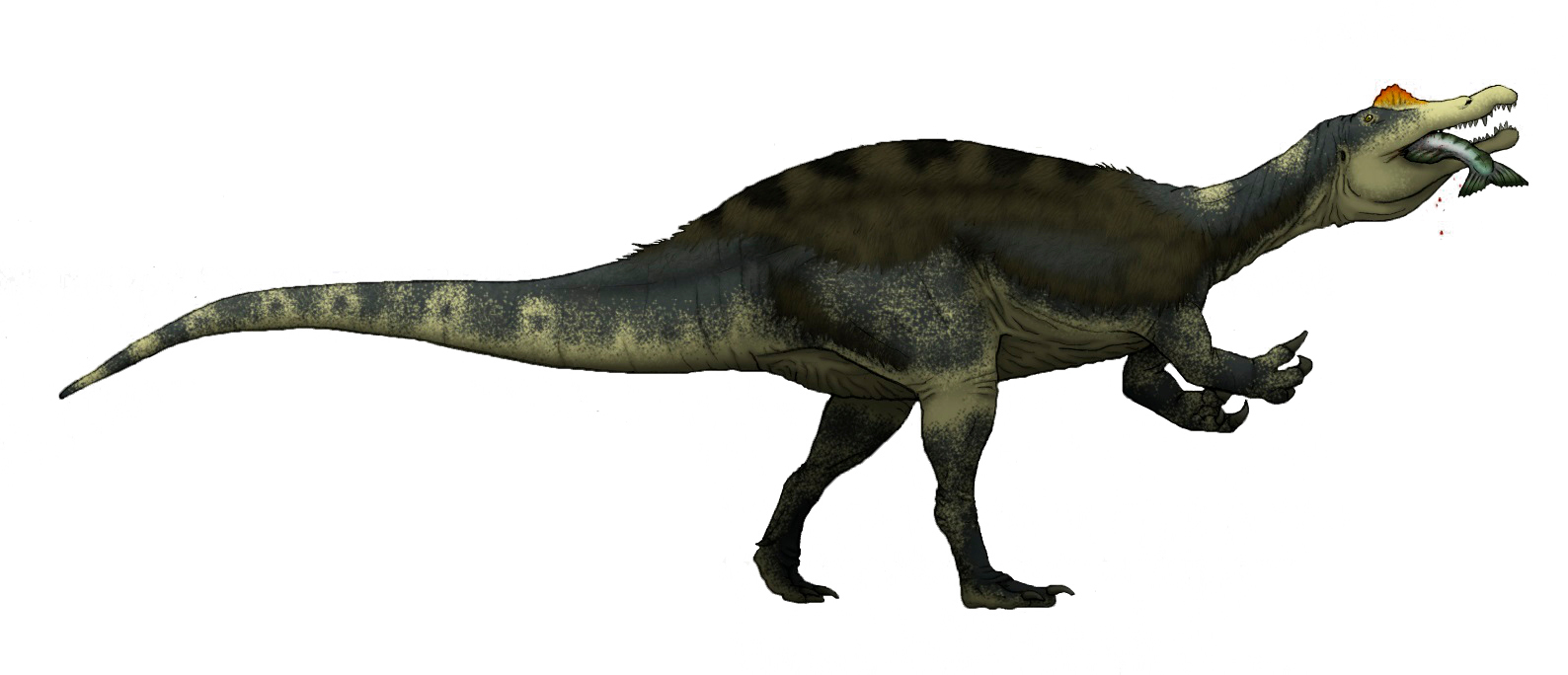
Life restoration of Vallibonavenatrix eating a fish

Vallibonavenatrix was a moderately-sized bipedal predator. The upwards-projecting neural spines of its dorsal vertebrae were moderately tall, and one known spine is expanded from bottom to top in a trapezoidal, fan-like shape, similar to those of the spinosaurid Ichthyovenator. Similarities between the morphology of the neural spines of these two taxa may indicate the presence of elongated spines forming a sail on Vallibonavenatrix's back, as is seen in some other spinosaurids. The sacrum of Vallibonavenatrix had deep pleurocoelous fossae (depressions) and pneumatic (air-filled) openings. The ilium of the pelvis was also highly pneumatic, and had large internal chambers.

== Classification ==
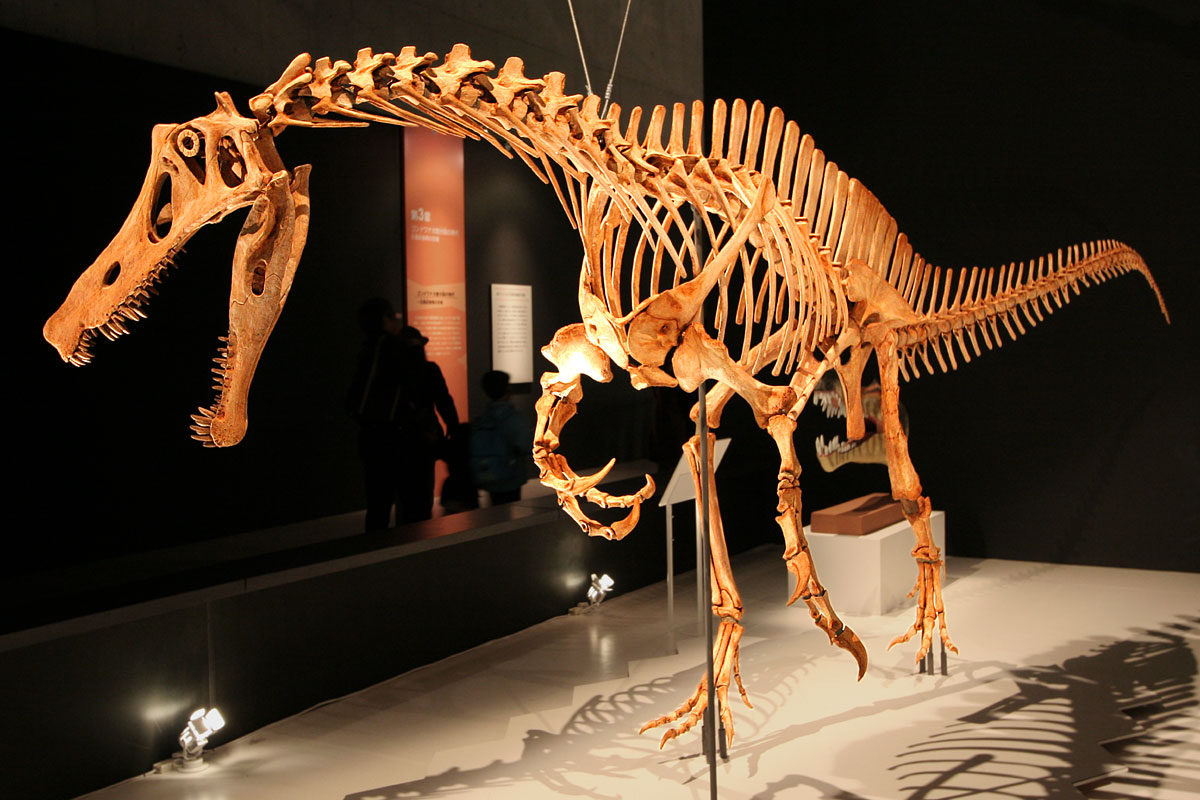
Reconstructed skeleton of the spinosaurine genus Irritator at the National Museum of Nature and Science, Tokyo

In 2020, Malafaia and her team classified Vallibonavenatrix within the Spinosauridae, a family of large-bodied tetanuran dinosaurs traditionally separated into two subfamilies: Spinosaurinae and Baryonychinae. Though closer in proximity to European baryonychines such as Baryonyx from the Barremian of Spain and England, Vallibonavenatrix was found to be more closely related to spinosaurines such as Spinosaurus and Irritator from the southern supercontinent Gondwana, and the Asian genus Ichthyovenator. Thus, Malafaia and colleagues placed it within Spinosaurinae. The results of their analysis are shown in the following cladogram:

- Spinosauridae
  - Spinosaurinae
    - Irritator
    - Ichthyovenator
    - Spinosaurus (MSNM V4047)
    - Spinosaurus (holotype)
    - Vallibonavenatrix
  - Baryonychinae
    - Baryonyx
    - Sigilmassasaurus
    - Suchomimus

However, in 2020, Chris Barker and colleagues instead found Vallibonavenatrix in one of two positions, depending on the type of analysis (parsimony-based or Bayesian) that they performed: outside of both Spinosaurinae and Baryonychinae as the most basal (least specialized) spinosaurid, or as a member of the Baryonychinae. They concluded that its phylogenetic position was unstable.

Like the results of Barker et al., a 2022 study by Octávio Mateus and Darío Estraviz-López did not find Vallibonavenatrix to be a spinosaurine. However, certain anatomical characteristics may indicate an affinity with that group, rather than with the baryonychines. Spinosaurine affinities were supported in a 2025 reassessment of Camarillasaurus by Rauhut and colleagues, who recovered Vallibonavenatrix within the Spinosaurinae, diverging after Iberospinus.

== Palaeoenvironment ==
Vallibonavenatrix hails from the Arcillas de Morella Formation, which has been dated to the Barremian stage of the Early Cretaceous period, between 129.4 and 125 million years ago. It coexisted in this environment with other dinosaurs including the ornithischians Iguanodon bernissartensis and Morelladon beltrani, the somphospondylian sauropod Garumbatitan morellensis, and fellow spinosaurids Camarillasaurus cirugedae, Iberospinus natarioi and Riojavenatrix lacustris.
