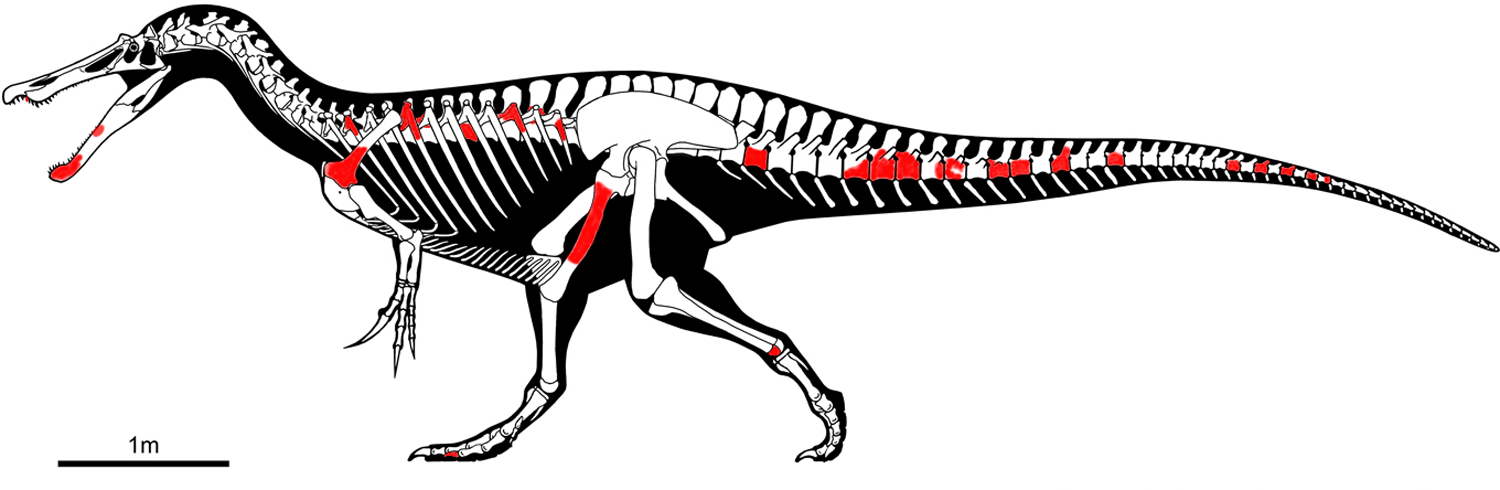
- Skeletal diagram of the related Baryonyx, showing the known bones of Iberospinus in red

Scientific classification
- Kingdom: Animalia
- Phylum: Chordata
- Class: Reptilia
- Clade: Dinosauria
- Clade: Saurischia
- Clade: Theropoda
- Family: †Spinosauridae
- Genus: †Iberospinus; Mateus & Estraviz-López, 2022
- Species: †I. natarioi

Binomial name
- †Iberospinus natarioi Mateus & Estraviz-López, 2022

= Iberospinus =

Iberospinus Temporal range: Early Cretaceous (Barremian), 129.4–125 Ma

Extinct genus of spinosaurid dinosaur

Iberospinus (meaning "Iberian spine") is an extinct genus of spinosaurid dinosaur from the Early Cretaceous (Barremian) Papo Seco Formation of Portugal. The genus contains a single species, I. natarioi, known from several assorted bones belonging to one individual. Iberospinus represents one of five known spinosaurid taxa from the Iberian Peninsula, the others being Camarillasaurus, Protathlitis, Riojavenatrix, and Vallibonavenatrix. It is important for its implications of the geographical origin of Spinosauridae and the suggested presence of potentially semi-aquatic lifestyle earlier in the evolution of this clade.

== Discovery and naming ==
Life reconstruction of Iberospinus showing a 3D digitalization of some of the recovered bones, as well as reconstructed musculature

The first fossil material was discovered in 1999, with additional expeditions from 2004 to 2008. After being described as a specimen of Baryonyx in 2011, it was realised to have been a unique species in 2019, with specimen ML1190 as the holotype. Additional material was discovered in a June 2020 expedition, after which Iberospinus was described as a new genus and species in 2022 by Octávio Mateus and Darío Estraviz-López.

Iberospinus is currently known from dentary fragments, teeth, an incomplete right scapula, partial dorsal and caudal vertebrae, rib fragments, a partial pubis, two incomplete calcanea, and a pedal ungual phalanx. All of the material belongs to one individual. The holotype material, despite being highly fragmentary, represents one of the more complete spinosaurid specimens known.

Of the generic name, "Iberospinus," "ibero" is derived from Iberia, a Roman name for the Iberian Peninsula, while the Latin spinus [ˈs̠piːnʊs̠] means spine, after the elongated neural spines of related spinosaurids. The specific name, "natarioi" honors Carlos Natário, the discoverer of the holotype.

== Description ==
Scapula of Iberospinus

The dentary (lower jaw) of Iberospinus shows an intricate neurovascular system that would connect the teeth and the external foramina. A series of replacement teeth are also preserved in the dentary. Characteristics of the bones, especially in the tail and pedal ungual phalanx, indicate a possible semi-aquatic lifestyle, though the extreme features in some related spinosaurines are not seen.

The following autapomorphies distinguish Iberospinus. The dentary bone contains a single foramen within the Meckelian sulcus and has a straight ventral edge instead of curved as in most other spinosaurids. Laminae are present in the pleurocoelic depression of the mediodistal tail vertebrae. The scapula has a straight anterior rim without a protruding acromion and a coracoidal contact occupying the entire ventral surface. The pubic apron is thick throughout the entire length of the pubic shaft. There is a mound-like eminence in the proximal lateral portion of the pubic bone.

== Classification ==
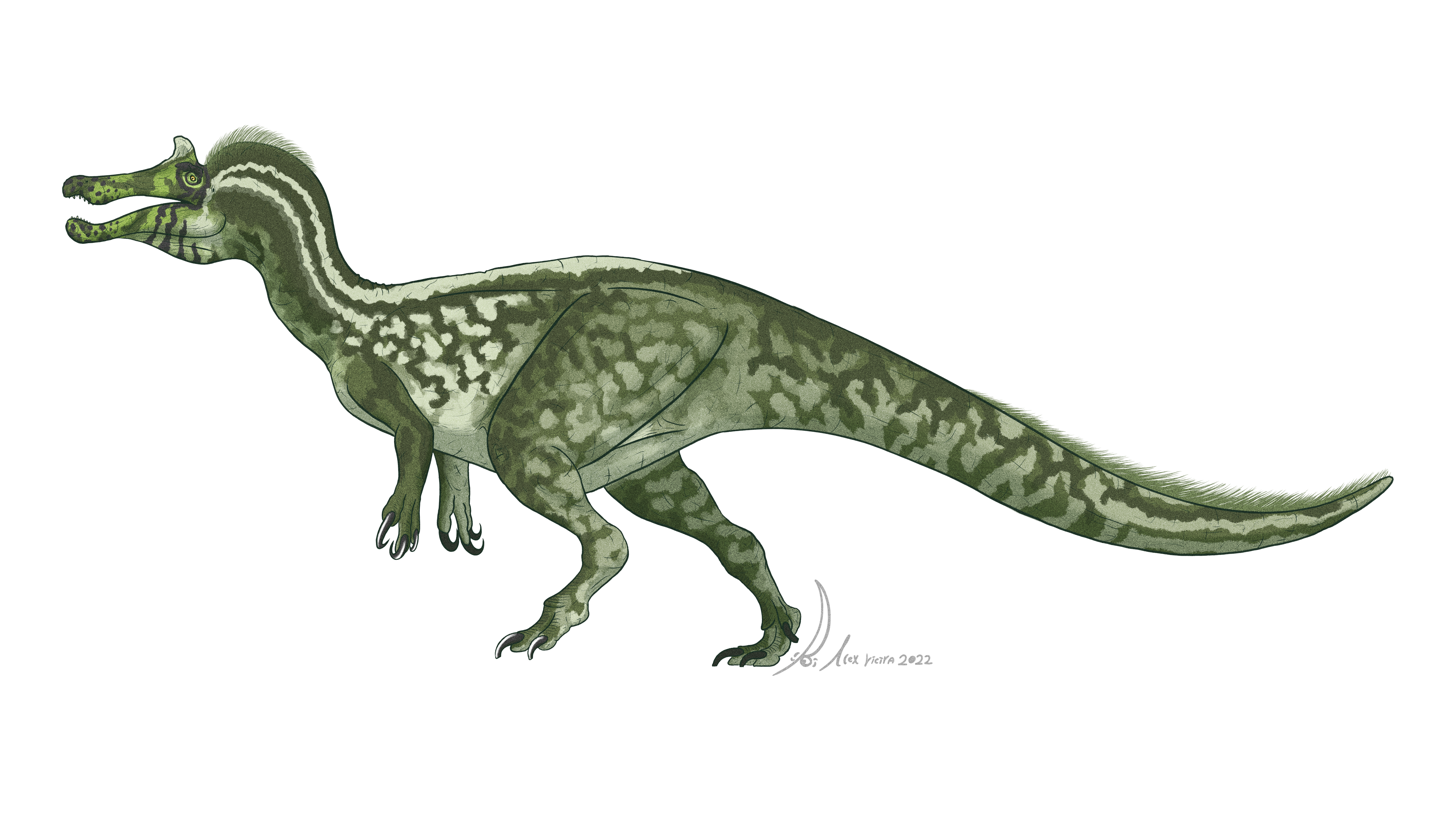
Speculative life restoration

The Iberospinus fossil material was included in phylogenetic analyses before it received a scientific name. In 2019, Arden et al. recovered it as a spinosaurid outside of the Baryonychinae and Spinosaurinae. They noted that the anterior end of the dentary is not strongly upturned, as one might expect to see in a baryonychine, despite it having been originally described as a specimen of Baryonyx. However, in their 2021 description of the Wessex Formation baryonychines Ceratosuchops and Riparovenator, Barker et al. recovered the material as the sister taxon to Baryonyx, with this clade as the sister taxon to the Ceratosuchopsini. Their results are shown in the cladogram below:

- Spinosauridae
  - Vallibonavenatrix
  - - Spinosaurinae
    - Baryonychinae
      - - Iberospinus
        - Baryonyx
      - Ceratosuchopsini
        - Suchomimus
        - - Riparovenator
          - Ceratosuchops

In their description of Mateus & Estraviz-López (2022) recovered Iberospinus within the Spinosauridae, outside of both the Baryonychinae and the Spinosaurinae, similar to the results of Arden et al. (2019). However, they explain that the fossil material shows some characteristics of baryonychines, suggesting a closer relation to the group. A cladogram after the describing authors is shown below:

- Spinosauridae
  - Iberospinus
  - Baryonychinae
    - Suchomimus
    - Baryonyx
  - Spinosaurinae
    - Spinosaurus
    - Ichthyovenator
    - Irritator

In their 2023 description of Protathlitis, Santos-Cubedo et al. performed a phylogenetic analysis, recovering a taxonomic split between the Baryonychinae and Spinosaurinae, similar to the previous results of Mateus & Estraviz-López (2022). Although Iberospinus was not included in their analysis, they proposed that, due to similarities in anatomy, likely phylogenetic position, and age, Iberospinus may be either the sister taxon to Camarillasaurus, or possibly synonymous with it. In their 2025 reassessment of Camarillasaurus, Rauhut and colleagues recovered Iberospinus as the basalmost member of the Spinosaurinae, with Camarillasaurus as a later-diverging taxon, precluding their synonymization.

== Paleobiology ==
CT scan of the holotype dentary, showing teeth (blue), replacement teeth (green and pink), and neurovascular system (yellow)

A 2017 histological study of growth lines by the German palaeontologist Katja Waskow and Mateus found that specimen ML1190 had died between the age of 23 and 25 years old, and was close to its maximum size and skeletal maturity. This contradicted a younger age indicated by the neurocentral sutures not being fused, and the presence of both mature and sub-adult traits may be due to paedomorphosis (where juvenile traits are retained into adulthood). Paedomorphic traits may be related to swimming locomotion, as they have been suggested in other extinct animals thought to have been aquatic (such as plesiosaurs and temnospondyls). The study also found that the animal had reached sexual maturity at the age of 13 to 15 years, due to a decrease in growth rate at this point.

== Palaeoenvironment ==
The Papo Seco Formation of Portugal where Iberospinus is known from is composed of marl, representing a lagoon environment. Other dinosaur remains from the area include fragments tentatively assigned to Mantellisaurus, a macronarian sauropod, and Megalosaurus. Most of the bones of Iberospinus specimen ML1190 were damaged, and some scratches may be marks from small scavengers. The specimen's disarticulation indicates it was transported from a more-terrestrial environment (since many bones are missing), but those found were close together.
