= Angela Milner =

British paleontologist (1947–2021)

Angela Cheryl Milner
- Angela Milner (right) with Baryonyx walkeri (left)
- Born: Angela Girven; 3 October 1947; Gosforth, England
- Died: 13 August 2021 (aged 73)
- Education: Newcastle University
- Spouse: Andrew Milner
- Scientific career
- Fields: Vertebrate paleontology
- Workplaces: Natural History Museum, London, UK
- Doctoral advisor: Alec Panchen

Angela Cheryl Milner (3 October 1947 – 13 August 2021) was a British paleontologist who, in 1986 alongside Alan Charig, described the dinosaur Baryonyx.

== Early life ==
Milner was born Angela Girven in Gosforth, daughter of Cyril and Lucia Girven. Her father was the county engineer for Northumberland. She attended Newcastle upon Tyne Church High School. She initially planned to focus on microbiology for her university degree, but inspiring lectures from Alec Panchen made her change to palaeontology. She gained a BSc in zoology at Newcastle University and stayed there in 1969 to take a PhD in palaeontology supervised by Panchen focusing on the nectrideans, a group of Paleozoic tetrapods.

== Career ==
Milner was first employed at the Natural History Museum in London in 1976. Her unusual career path led her to reach a management as well as scientific role, finally being promoted to Assistant Keeper of Palaeontology as well as being a senior scientist. She was Head of the Fossil Vertebrates Division in the Department of Palaeontology and was scientific leader behind the new Dinosaur Gallery at the museum that opened in 1992. She retired in 2009.

Her primary work was early tetrapods, the subject of her doctorate. Her most significant scientific work was on description of the fossilised remains of Baryonyx walkeri, a fish-eating dinosaur. This was found in a clay-pit in Surrey and was the most complete dinosaur skeleton identified in the UK to that date. It provided the key to interpretation of further dinosaur fragments discovered around the world to start a new research area in palaeontology. She continued to work on meat-eating dinosaurs, and the earliest birds that had descended from them, for the rest of her career. In 2004 she led a study of the brain of Archaeopteryx, providing evidence to suggest the species was a bird. She also studied bird species from the Eocene period which are found in the southern England. She appreciated how the new technology of CT-scanning could be used to visualise the interior of fossils in details, which led to the installation of a suitable machine at the museum. In addition, she began to collaborate with others to isolate proteins from fossil in the new field of molecular palaeontology. Milner undertook field work in the UK and abroad in several locations including the US, the Sahara desert and, from the 1980s, China.

The dinosaurs Veterupristisaurus milneri, Riparovenator milnerae and Pendraig milnerae have been named after her.

== Personal life ==
She married Andrew Milner in 1972 whilst they were postgraduate students. Milner died on the morning of 13 August 2021, at the age of 73, following a short illness.

== Publications ==
Milner is the author or co-author of over 60 scientific publications. She continued to publish after her retirement and up to her death. Her publications include:

- Walsh, Stig A, Iwaniuk, Andrew N, Knoll, Monja A, Bourdon, Estelle, Barrett, Paul M, Milner, Angela C, Nudds, Robert L, Abel, Richard L and Patricia Dello Sterpaio (2013) Avian cerebellar floccular fossa size is not a proxy for flying ability in birds. PLOS ONE 8 e67176
- Archibald, J David, Clemens, WA, Padian, Kevin and 20 other authors including Angela C. Milner. (2010) Cretaceous extinctions: multiple causes. Science 328 973–973
- Alonso, PD, Milner, AC, Ketcham, RA, Cookson, MJ and Rowe, TB (2004) The avian nature of the brain and inner ear of Archaeopteryx. Nature 430 666–66
- Macleod, N, Rawson, PF, Forey, PL, and 19 other authors including Milner, AC (1997) The Cretaceous-Tertiary biotic transition. Journal of the Geological Society 154 265–292
- AJ Charig and AC Milner (1986) Baryonyx, a remarkable new theropod dinosaur. Nature 324 359–361

She was co-author of The Natural History Museum Book of Dinosaurs.
