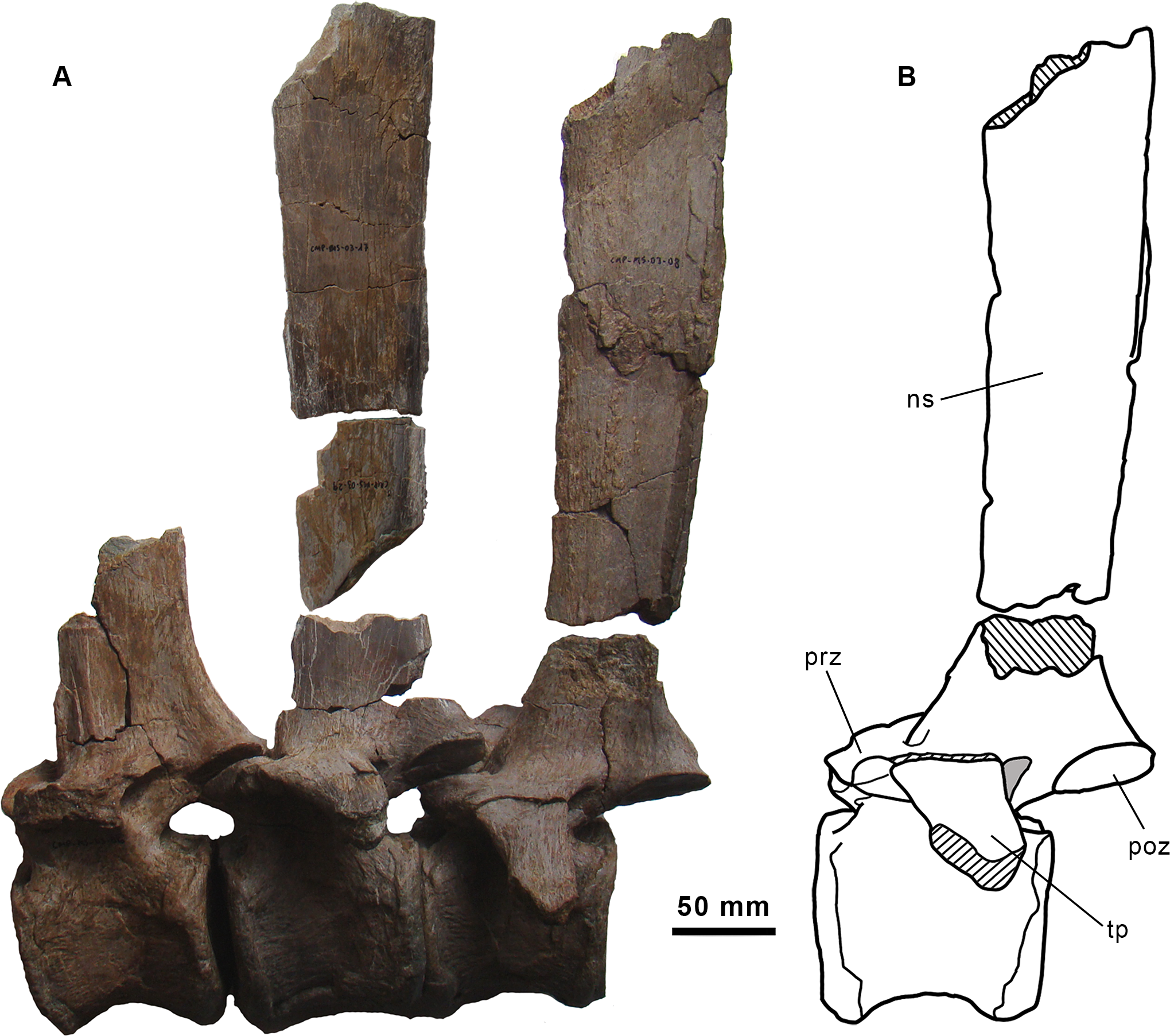
- Dorsal vertebrae

Scientific classification
- Kingdom: Animalia
- Phylum: Chordata
- Class: Reptilia
- Clade: Dinosauria
- Clade: †Ornithischia
- Clade: †Ornithopoda
- Clade: †Ankylopollexia
- Clade: †Styracosterna
- Genus: †Morelladon; Gasulla et al., 2015
- Species: †M. beltrani

Binomial name
- †Morelladon beltrani Gasulla et al., 2015

= Morelladon =

Morelladon Temporal range: Early Cretaceous, 130 Ma

Extinct genus of dinosaurs

Morelladon is an extinct genus of herbivorous styracosternan ornithopod dinosaur. It lived during the Early Cretaceous of Spain, around 130 million years ago.

== Discovery ==
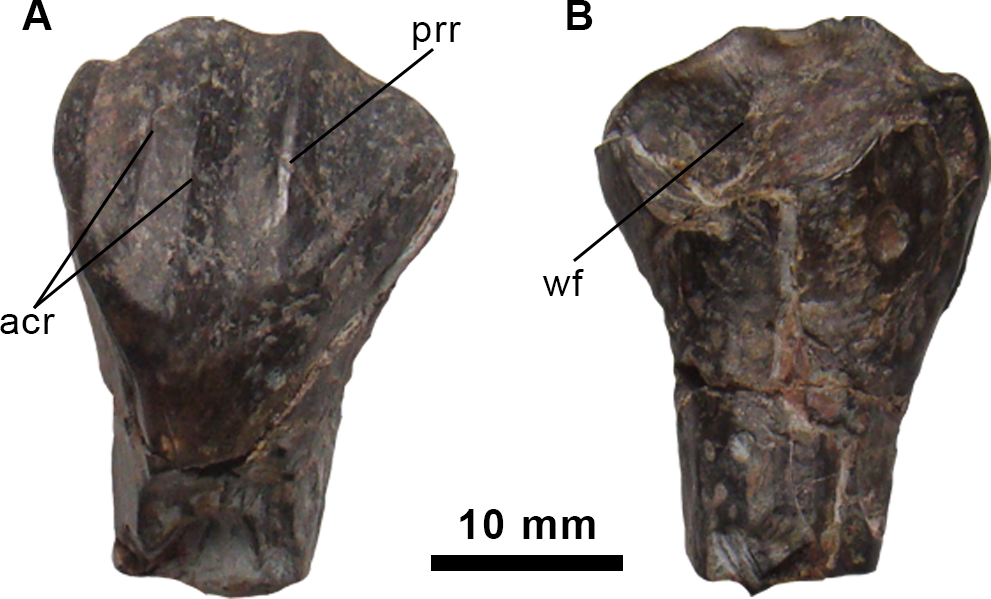
Tooth

In 2013, teams of the Universidad Nacional de Educación a Distancia (UNED) and the Universidad Autónoma de Madrid, at the Mas de Sabaté (CMP-MS) site of the Mas de la Parreta quarry at Morella discovered a skeleton of a euornithopod. The fossil was prepared by Juan Miguel Soler, Miguel Ángel Aguilar, Jesús Royo and Manuel Domingo García.

In 2015, the type species Morelladon beltrani was named and described by José Miguel Gasulla, Fernando Escaso, Iván Narváez, Francisco Ortega and José Luis Sanz. The generic name combines a reference to Morella with Greek ὀδών, odṓn, "tooth". The specific name honours Victor Beltrán, the owner of the Vega del Moll S.A. Company exploiting the quarries, for his cooperation with the scientific research.

The holotype, CMP-MS-03, was found in a layer of the Arcillas de Morella Formation traditionally dated to the early Aptian, but according to recent palynological research perhaps dating from the late Barremian. It consists of a partial skeleton lacking the skull. It contains a right dentary tooth, seven dorsal vertebrae, fragments of the neural spines of dorsal vertebrae, two rib pieces, a sacrum, two chevrons, the ilia, incomplete pubes and ischia and a right tibia.

Morelladon was one of eighteen dinosaur taxa from 2015 to be described in open access or free-to-read journals.

== Description ==
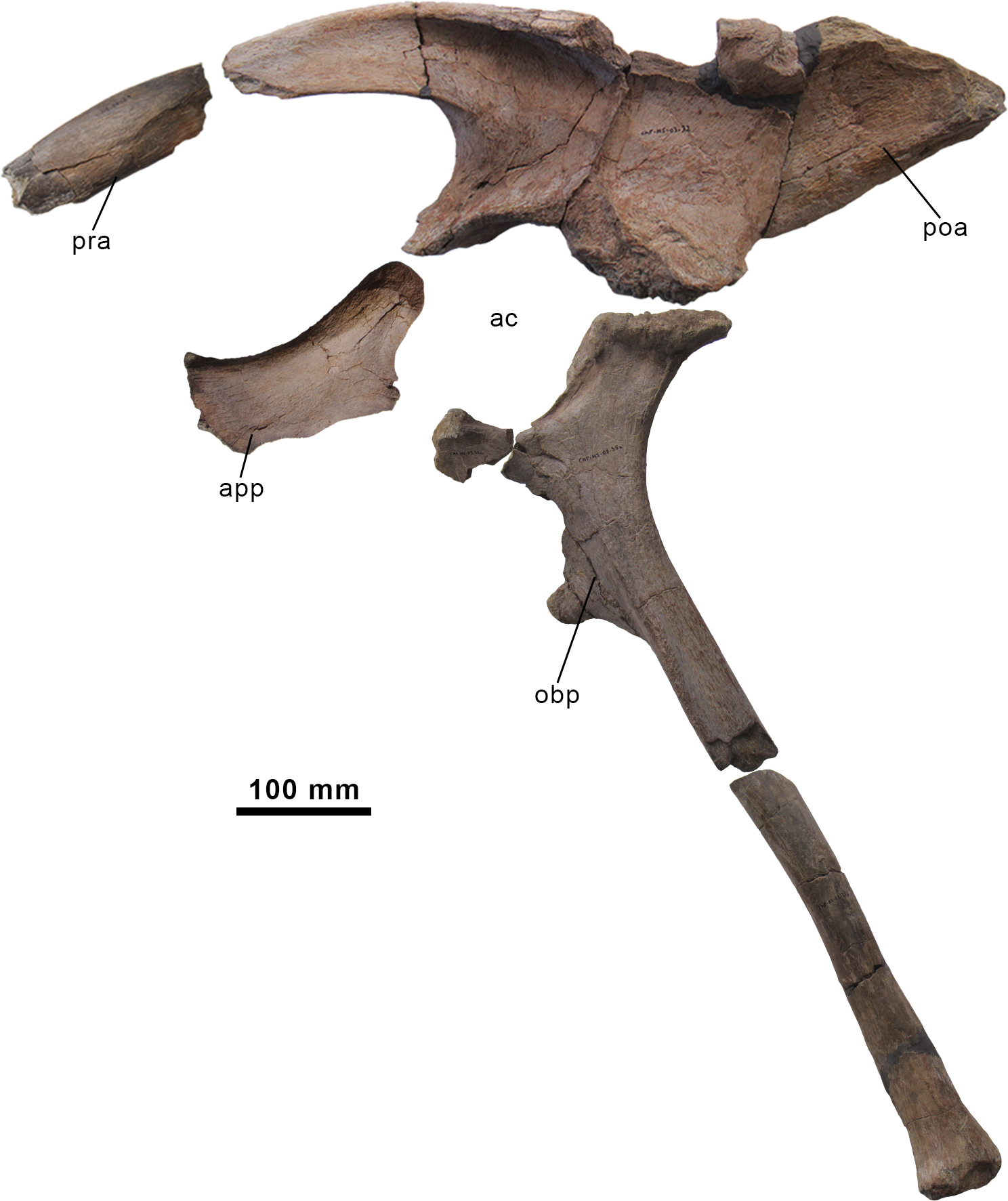
Pelvis

Morelladon is a medium-sized euornithopod. Its body length has been estimated at six metres, its weight at two tonnes.

The describing authors established some distinguishing traits. These were all autapomorphies, unique derived qualities. The longest neural spines reach a height of at least 4.3 times the height of their vertebral bodies. The rear middle back vertebrae have a very high and deep depression between their rear articular processes and the base of the neural spine, 2.6 times higher than that base is long, measured from the front to the rear. The rib of the dorsosacral vertebra is fused with the sacral yoke. With the second and third sacral vertebrae the keel at the underside is limited to the front part of the vertebral body. With the fourth sacral vertebra the keel has a similar position but is low and wide. The facets for the dorsosacral and first sacral ribs are located close to each other near the top edge of the ilium, higher than the facets of the other sacral ribs. The ridge on the inner side of the rear blade of the ilium runs obliquely to behind and above, forming a slightly swollen bone shelf, directed to the inside, on the rear part of the rear blade. The lower end of the ischium has a D-shaped cross-section due to an extension on the outer side.
