= 2010 in arthropod paleontology =

This list of fossil arthropods described in 2010 is a list of new taxa of trilobites, fossil insects, crustaceans, arachnids and other fossil arthropods of every kind that have been described during the year 2010. The list only includes taxa at the level of genus or species.

== Dinocaridida ==
Newly named Dinocaridids
Name	Novelty	Status	Authors	Age	Unit	Location	Notes	Images
Amplectobelua stephenensis	Sp nov	Valid	Daley & Budd	Middle Cambrian	Burgess Shale Formation	Canada	A radiodont	Amplectobelua stephenensis (frontal appendage)
Caryosyntrips	Gen et sp nov	Valid	Daley & Budd	Middle Cambrian	Burgess Shale Formation	Canada	A radiodont, type species C. serratus	Caryosyntrips serratus (frontal appendage)
Tamisiocaris	Gen et sp nov	Valid	Daley & Peel	Cambrian	Buen Formation; Kinzers Formation	Greenland; United States	A suspension-feeding radiodont. The type species is T. borealis	Tamisiocaris borealis (frontal appendage)

== Newly named crustaceans ==
Name	Novelty	Status	Authors	Age	Unit	Location	Notes	Images
Aciculopoda	Fam, gen et Sp nov	Valid	Feldmann & Schweitzer	Devonian		USA	Oldest known shrimp.	
Chenops	Gen et sp nov	Valid	Hegna & Ren	Barremian	Yixian Formation	China	A notostracan	Chenops yixianensis
Jeholops	Gen et sp nov	Valid	Hegna & Ren	Barremian	Yixian Formation	China	A notostracan	Jeholops (left)
Nasunaris	Gen et sp nov	Valid	Siveter, Briggs, Siveter, & Sutton	Silurian		UK	An ostracod	
Pseudotealliocaris holthuisi	Sp nov	Jr synonym	Irham, Schram & Vonk	Mississippian	Leitchfield Formation	USA (Kentucky)	Moved to the genus Tealliocaris in 2013	

== Newly named insects ==
- A new family of ceraphronoid Hymenopters, Radiophronidae, is published by Ortega-Blanco, Rasnitsyn, and Delclòs.
- A new family, Mendozachoristidae, is published by Brauckmann et al..
- A new family of Moths, Mesokristenseniidae, is published by Huang, Nel and Minet.
- A new order of holometabolous insects, Nakridletia, is published by Vršanský, Ren & Shih.
- A new family of holometabolous insects, Vosilidae, is published by Vršanský, Ren & Shih.
- A new family of Cockroaches, Socialidae, is published by Vršanský.
- A new family of fulgoroid hemipterans, Weiwoboidae, is published by Lin, Szwedo, Huang and Stroiński.

Name	Novelty	Status	Authors	Age	Unit	Location	Notes	Images
Bohemiatupus elegans	gen et sp nov	Valid	Prokop & Nel	Westphalian	Kladno Formation	Czech Republic		
Camptoneurites soyanensis	gen et sp nov	Valid	Aristov, Storozhenko, & Cui	Kazanian	Soyana locality	Russia	A notopteran belonging to the family Camptoneuritidae	
Cantabroraphidia	gen et sp nov	Valid	Pérez-de la Fuente, Nel, Peñalver, & Delclòs	Albian	Las Peñosas Formation, Cave of El Soplao	Spain	A mesoraphidiid snakefly; The type species is C. marcanoi	Cantabroraphidia marcanoi
Cascopleciidae	fam, gen et sp nov	Valid	Poinar	Early Cretaceous	Burmese amber	Myanmar	A flower-visiting Bibionomorpha fly. Type genus Cascoplecia, type species C. insolitis	Cascoplecia
Crepidodera decolorata	sp nov	Valid	Nadein & Perkovsky	Late Eocene	Rovno amber	Ukraine	A flea beetle	
Deinodryinus? aptianus	sp nov	Valid	Olmi, Rasnitsyn, & Guglielmino	Aptian	Khurilt rock unit	Mongolia	A dryinid wasp.	Deinodryinus? aptianus
Ektatotricha	gen et sp nov	Valid	Chatzimanolis, Engel, Newton, & Grimaldi	Middle Cretaceous	Burmese amber	Myanmar		
Electroatopos	gen et sp nov	Valid	Chatzimanolis, Engel, Newton, & Grimaldi	Middle Cretaceous	Burmese amber	Myanmar		
Epiaeschna pseudoheros	Sp nov	valid	Nel & Petrulevicius	Chattian	Les Figons	France	An Aeshnid dragonfly	Epiaeschna pseudoheros
Holcorpa dillhoffi	sp nov	valid	Archibald	Ypresian	McAbee fossil site	Canada	A holcorpid scorpionfly	
Iberoevania	gen et sp nov	Valid	Peñalver, Ortega-Blanco, Nel, & Delclòs	Early Cretaceous	Amber	Spain	An evaniid	
Jerseyempheria	gen et sp nov	Valid	Azar, Nel, & Petrulevicius	Cretaceous	New Jersey amber	USA	A empheriid psocodean	
Kachinus	gen et sp nov	Valid	Chatzimanolis, Engel, Newton, & Grimaldi	Middle Cretaceous	Burmese amber	Myanmar		
Lichnomesopsyche	gen et sp nov	Valid	Ren, Labandeira, & Shih	Middle Jurassic	Jiulongshan Formation	China	A mesopsychid mecopteran	
Limnoxenus olenus	Sp nov	Valid	Fikacek, Prokop, & Nel	Chattian	Niveau du gypse d'Aix Formation	France	A water scavenger beetle	Limnoxenus olenus
Manobiomorpha	gen et sp nov	Valid	Nadein & Perkovsky	Late Eocene	Rovno amber	Ukraine	A flea beetle	
Mendozachorista	fam, gen et sp nov	Valid	Brauckmann, Gallego, Hauschke, Martins-Neto, Groening, Ilger, & Lara	Late Triassic	Llantenes Formation	Argentina	The species is M. volkheimeri	
Mesokristensenia	fam, gen et sp nov	Valid	Huang, Nel, & Minet	Middle Jurassic	Daohugou Beds	China		
Microcostaphron	gen et sp nov	Valid	Ortega-Blanco, Rasnitsyn, & Delclòs	Early Cretaceous	Álava amber	Spain	The species is M. parvus	
Nylanderia pygmaea	Comb nov	Valid	(Mayr)	Middle Eocene	European amber	Europe	A formicine ant, new combination for Paratrechina pygmaea	Nylanderia pygmaea
Paleophaedon	gen et sp nov	Valid	Nadein & Perkovsky	Late Eocene	Rovno amber	Ukraine	A chrysomeline leaf beetle	
Parazila	gen et sp nov	Synonymized	Vršanský, Ren, & Shih	Late Jurassic		Russia	A fly	
Psyllototus	gen et sp nov	Valid	Nadein & Perkovsky	Late Eocene	Rovno amber	Ukraine	A flea beetle	
Radiophron	fam, gen et sp nov	Valid	Ortega-Blanco, Rasnitsyn, & Delclòs	Early Cretaceous	Álava amber	Spain	The species is R. ibericus	
Raptorapax	gen et sp nov	Valid	Petrulevicius, Azar, & Nel	Early Cretaceous	Amber	Lebanon	A rhachiberothid lacewing	
Sinaktassia	Gen. et sp. nov.	Valid	Lin, Nel & Huang	Early Cretaceous	Yixian Formation	China	A dragonfly belonging to the group Petaluroidea and the family Aktassiidae. The type species is S. tangi.	
Sociala	fam, gen et sp nov	Valid	Vršanský	Albian	Amber	France	A cockroach	
Sapho legrandi	Sp nov	valid	Nel & Petrulevicius	Chattian	Les Figons	France	A Calopterygid damselfly	Sapho legrandi
Tyulkinia	gen et sp nov	Valid	Aristov, Storozhenko, & Cui	Kungurian	Tyulkino locality	Russia	A notopteran belonging to the family Camptoneuritidae	
Vitimopsyche kozlovi	gen et sp nov	Valid	Ren, Labandeira, & Shih	Early Cretaceous	Jehol Biota	China	A mesopsychid mecopteran	
Vosila	fam, gen et sp nov	Valid	Vršanský, Ren, & Shih	Middle Jurassic		China	A fly	
Weiwoboa	Fam, gen et sp nov	Valid	Lin, Szwedo, Huang, & Stroiński	Lower Eocene		China		

== Newly named spiders ==
Name	Status	Authors	Age	Unit	Location	Notes	Images
Eoplectreurys	Valid	Selden; Huang	Middle Jurassic	Daohugou Beds	China	The oldest known haplogyne spider.	

== Trilobites ==
Newly named trilobites
Name	Novelty	Status	Authors	Age	Unit	Location	Notes	Images
Pseudocybele paranasuta	Sp nov	Valid	McAdams & Adrain	Early Ordovician	Fillmore Limestone	United States	A member of the family Pliomeridae.	
