= Escucha Formation =

Geological formation in Spain

- Stratigraphic range: Late Aptian-mid Albian; ~117–103 Ma
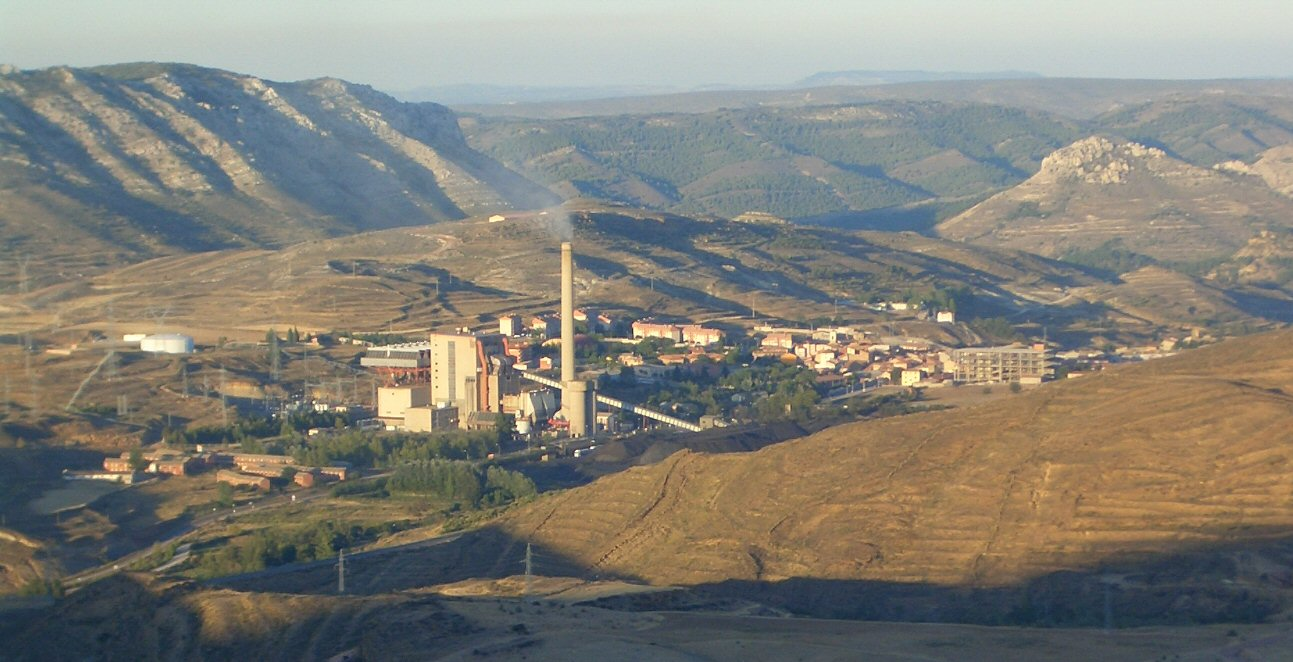
- View of Escucha and surrounding rocks
- Type: Geological formation
- Sub-units: E1 to E3
- Underlies: Utrillas Formation
- Overlies: Castrillo de la Reina, Benassal and Oliete Formations
- Thickness: ~70 m (230 ft)

Lithology
- Primary: Siltstone, mudstone (E1, E3) sandstone (E2)
- Other: Coal (E1) siltstone (E2), amber

Location
- Coordinates: 42.6°N 2.7°W
- Approximate paleocoordinates: 30.4°N 1.4°E
- Region: Teruel, Aragón; La Rioja
- Country: Spain
- Extent: Cameros, Maestrazgo and Oliete Basins

Type section
- Named for: Escucha, Teruel
- Escucha Formation (Spain)

The Escucha Formation is a geological formation in La Rioja and Teruel provinces of northeastern Spain whose strata date back to the late Aptian to middle Albian stages of the Early Cretaceous. Dinosaur remains are among the fossils that have been recovered from the formation.

The approximately 70 m (230 ft) thick formation underlies the Utrillas Formation and overlies Castrillo de la Reina, Benassal & Oliete Formations. The Escucha Formation comprises siltstones, mudstones, sandstones, coal, siltstones and amber, in which diverse fossil insects were found. The formation was deposited in a variety of continental to paralic (deltaic) environments.

== Depositional Environment ==
The Escucha Formation represents syn-rift depositional environment, deposited in siliciclastic carbonate platforms, coastal siliciclastic environments and other offshore settings. In the basal part of the formation, cobble to boulder-sized dropstones of glacial origin have been identified, representing long-distance iceberg rafting from Arctic sources.

== Fossil content ==
The Escucha Formation has provided the following fossils, among others:

=== Dinosaurs ===
Dinosaurs of the Escucha Formation
Genus	Species	Region	Member	Material	Notes	Image
Proa	P. valdearinnoensis	Santa Maria Mine	Lower Sedimentary Succession Member	Three partial skeletons and several skull elements from different individuals	Hadrosauriform ornithopod	
Europelta	E. carbonensis	Santa Maria Mine	Lower Sedimentary Succession Member	Two partial skeletons	Struthiosaurine ankylosaur	
Allosauroidea indet.	indeterminate	Santa Maria Mine	Lower Sedimentary Succession Member	Tooth		
Titanosauriformes indet.	indeterminate			Partial unla		

=== Pseudosuchia ===
Pseudosuchians of the Escucha Formation
Genus	Species	Region	Member	Material	Notes	Image
Anteophthalmosuchus	A. escuchae	Santa Maria Mine	Lower Sedimentary Succession Member	Partial skeleton including skull, and other isolated remains	Goniopholididae. Partial skull AR-1-3422 represents juvenile individual of this taxon.	
Hulkepholis	H. plotos	Santa Maria Mine	Lower Sedimentary Succession Member	Partial skeleton including skull	Goniopholididae	

=== Testudines ===
Testudines of the Escucha Formation
Genus	Species	Region	Member	Material	Notes	Image
Aragochersis	A. lignitesta	Santa Maria Mine	Lower Sedimentary Succession Member	Two partial skeletons, both including complete skull	Helochelydridae turtle.	
Toremys	T. cassiopeia	Santa Maria Mine	Lower Sedimentary Succession Member	Multiple shells both articulated and disarticulated, and several appendicular elements	Pleurosternidae turtle.	
Trachydermochelys	T. sp.	Cabezo de las Eras	Lower Member		Helochelydridae turtle.	

=== Fishes ===
Fishes of the Escucha Formation
Genus	Species	Region	Member	Material	Notes	Image
Chondrichthyes indet.	Indeterminate	Santa Maria Mine	Lower Sedimentary Succession Member			
Osteichthyes indet.	Indeterminate	Santa Maria Mine	Lower Sedimentary Succession Member			

=== Molluscs ===
Molluscs of the Escucha Formation
Genus	Species	Region	Member	Material	Notes	Image
Bivalvia indet.	Indeterminate	Santa Maria Mine	Lower Sedimentary Succession Member			
Gastropoda indet.	Indeterminate	Santa Maria Mine	Lower Sedimentary Succession Member			

=== Crustacea ===
Crustaceans of the Escucha Formation
Genus	Species	Region	Member	Material	Notes	Image
Cretagourretia	C. salasi	CV-13 Roadcut			Ctenochelidae decapod	
Joeranina	J. tausi	CV-13 Roadcut			Palaeocorystidae decapod	

=== Insects ===
Insects
Taxa	Location/site	Notes	Images
Alavaraphidia	Peñacerrada I amber		
Amarantoraphidia	Peñacerrada I amber		
Microcostaphron parvus	Peñacerrada I amber		
Radiophron ibericus	Peñacerrada I amber		
Styporaphidia? hispanica	Peñacerrada I amber		

Other arthropods

- Alavia neli
- Archaelagonops alavensis
- Mesozygiella dunlopi
- Cretogarypinus zaragozai
- Ithioreolpium alavensis
- Alavesiaphis margaritae
- Hispanocader lisae
- Alavametra popovi
- Iberovelia quisquilia
- Glaesivelia pulcherrima
- Gymnopollisthrips maior
- G. minor
- Manicapsocidus enigmaticus
- Archaeatropos alavensis
- Preempheria antiqua
- Empheropsocus arilloi
- E. margineglabrus
- Morazatermes krishnai
- Cantabritermes simplex
- Autrigonoforceps iberica
- Hispanelcana alavensis
- H. arilloi
- H. lopezvallei
- Libanophron sugaar
- Hippocoon basajauni
- Burmaphron iratxoak
- B. jentilak
- B. sorginak
- Tagsmiphron olentzero
- Elasmophron mari
- Ectenobythus iberiensis
- Liztor pilosus
- Cretepyris martini
- Zophepyris alavaensis
- Ampulicomorpha perialla
- Microcostaphron parvus
- Archephedrus stolamissus
- Protorhyssalopsis perrichoti
- Spathiopteryx alavarommopsis
- Serphites lamiak
- Aposerphites angustus
- Archaeromma hispanicum
- Galloromma alavaensis
- Alavaromma orchamum
- Tithonoscelio resinalis
- Bruescelio platycephalus
- Electroteleiopsis hebdomas
- Alavascelio delvallei
- Amissascelio temporarius
- Perimoscelio tyrbastes
- Perimoscelio confector
- Proterosceliopsis masneri
- Juxtascelio interitus
- Iberopria perialla
- Iberoevania roblesi
- Cretevania alonsoi
- Iberomaimetsha nihtmara
- Iberomaimetsha rasnitsyni
- Valaa delclosi
- Megalava truncata
- Eosyntexis parva
- Cretasonoma corinformibus
- Penarhytus tenebris
- Prosolierius parvus
- Cretakarenni hispanicus
- Rhizophtoma longus
- Darwinylus marcosi
- Mediumiuga sinespinis
- Archiaustroconops alavensis
- Leptoconops (Leptoconops) zherikhini
- Gerontodacus skalskii
- Chimeromyia alava
- Chimeromyina concilia
- Euliphora grimaldii
- Alavesia subiasi
- Tethepomima holomma
- Tethepomyia buruhandi
- Lysistrata emerita
- Hegalari minor
- Hegalari antzinako
- Alavamanota hispanica
- Allocotocera xavieri
- Cretohaplusia ortunoi
- Eltxo cretaceus
- Helius (Helius) alavensis
- Helius (Helius) spiralis
- Espanoderus barbarae
- Alavaraphidia imperterrita
- Baissoptera cretaceoelectra
- Cretokatianna bucculenta
- Sphyrotheciscus senectus
- Archeallacma dolichopoda
- Katiannasminthurus xenopygus
- Pseudosminthurides stoechus
- Burmisotoma spinulifera
- Protoisotoma autrigoniensis
- Proisotoma communis
- Proleptochelia tenuissima
- Electrotanais monolithus
- Alavatanais carabe
- Alavatanais margulisae
- Eurotanais terminator
- Spinomegops arcanus
- Strieremaeus minguezae
- Iberofoveopsis miguelesi
- Hispanothrips utrillensis
- Aragonitermes teruelensis
- Aragonimantis aenigma
- Mymaropsis turolensis
- Serphites silban
- Galloromma turolensis
- Alavaromma orchamum
- Cretevania rubusensis
- Cretevania alcalai
- Cretevania montoyai
- Actenobius magneoculus
- Arra legalovi
- Leptoconops (Leptoconops) zherikhini
- Atriculicoides sanjusti
- Atriculicoides hispanicus
- Gerontodacus skalskii
- Microphorites utrillensis
- Litoleptis fossilis
- Burmazelmira grimaldii
- Aragomantispa lacerata
- Spinomegops aragonensis
- Ametroproctus valeriae
- Cretaceobodes martinezae
- Trhypochthonius lopezvallei

Invertebrates

- Ostracoda indet.
- Bivalvia indet.
- Gastropoda indet.

Flora

- Pinophyta
- Angiospermae indet.

== Correlation ==
Early Cretaceous stratigraphy of Iberia
Ma	Age	Paleomap \ Basins	Cantabrian	Olanyà	Cameros	Maestrazgo	Oliete	Galve	Morella	South Iberian	Pre-betic	Lusitanian
100	Cenomanian		La Cabana	Sopeira	Utrillas		Mosquerela					Caranguejeira
100	Cenomanian		Altamira	Sopeira	Utrillas							Caranguejeira
100	Cenomanian		Eguino	Sopeira	Utrillas							Caranguejeira
125	Albian		Ullaga - Balmaseda	Lluçà	Utrillas					Traiguera		Caranguejeira
125	Albian		Monte Grande	Lluçà	Escucha		Escucha			Jijona		Caranguejeira
125	Albian		Itxina - Miono	Lluçà	Escucha		Escucha					Caranguejeira
125	Aptian		Valmaseda - Tellamendi	Lluçà	Ol Gp. - Castrillo	Benassal	Escucha	Benassal				Olhos
125	Aptian		Valmaseda - Tellamendi	Font	En Gp. - Leza	Morella/Oliete	Oliete	Villaroya	Morella	Capas; Rojas		Almargem
125	Aptian		Patrocinio - Ernaga	Senyús	En Gp. - Jubela	Forcall			Morella	Villaroya	Upper; Bedoulian	Figueira
125	Barremian		Vega de Pas	Cabó	Abejar	Xert	Alacón	Xert	Morella	Huérguina	Upper; Bedoulian	Assises
125	Barremian		Vega de Pas	Prada	Abejar	Artoles			Morella	Collado	Moutonianum	Papo Seco
125	Barremian		Vega de Pas	Rúbies	Tera Gp. - Golmayo	Alacón/Blesa	Blesa	Camarillas	Mirambel	Collado	Moutonianum	Papo Seco
150	Hauterivian		Vega de Pas	Rúbies	Ur Gp. - Pinilla	Llacova	Blesa	Castellar	Tera Gp. - Pinilla	Villares		Porto da Calada
150	Hauterivian		Vega de Pas	Rúbies	Ur Gp. - Pinilla	Llacova	hiatus	Castellar		Villares		Porto da Calada
150	Hauterivian		Vega de Pas	Rúbies	Ur Gp. - Pinilla	Huerva	hiatus	Castellar	Gaita			Porto da Calada
150	Valanginian		Villaro	Rúbies	Ur Gp. - Larriba	Huerva	hiatus	Castellar	Ped Gp. - Hortigüela			Porto da Calada
150	Valanginian		Villaro	Rúbies	Ped Gp. - Hortigüela	Huerva	hiatus	Castellar	Ped Gp. - Piedrahita			Porto da Calada
150	Valanginian		Villaro	Rúbies	Peñacoba	Huerva	hiatus	Galve	Ped Gp. - Piedrahita	Miravetes		Porto da Calada
150	Berriasian		Cab Gp. - Arcera	Rúbies	Valdeprado	hiatus	hiatus	Alfambra	Ped Gp. - Piedrahita	Miravetes		Porto da Calada
150	Berriasian		Cab Gp. - Arcera		TdL Gp. - Rupelo	hiatus	hiatus	Arzobispo	hiatus	Tollo		Porto da Calada
150	Berriasian		Cab Gp. - Arcera		On Gp. - Huérteles; Sierra Matute	hiatus	hiatus	Arzobispo	hiatus	Tollo		Porto da Calada
150	Tithonian		Lastres		Tera Gp. - Magaña	hiatus	Higuereles		hiatus	Tera Gp. - Magaña		Lourinhã
150	Tithonian		Lastres		Tera Gp. - Magaña	hiatus	Higuereles		Arzobispo	Tera Gp. - Magaña		Lourinhã
150	Tithonian		Lastres		Ágreda	hiatus	Higuereles		Arzobispo	Tera Gp. - Magaña		Lourinhã
Legend		Major fossiliferous, oofossiliferous, ichnofossiliferous, coproliferous, minor formation										

== See also ==
- List of dinosaur-bearing rock formations
- Monte Grande Formation, Albian formation of the Cantabrian Basin
- Caranguejeira Conglomerate, Aptian to Cenomanian formation of the Lusitanian Basin
- Baltic, Burmese, Dominican and Mexican amber
