= Strashila =

Strashila Temporal range: Callovian–Kimmeridgian

Scientific classification
- Kingdom: Animalia
- Phylum: Arthropoda
- Class: Insecta
- Order: Diptera
- Family: †Strashilidae
- Genus: †Strashila; Rasnitsyn, 1992

Extinct genus of flies

Strashila is an extinct genus of nematoceran flies in the family Strashilidae. There are at least two described species in Strashila.

== Species ==
These two species belong to the genus Strashila:

- † Strashila daohugouensis Huang, Nel, Cai, Lin & Engel, 2013 Daohugou, China, Callovian
- † Strashila incredibilis Rasnitsyn, 1992 Badin Formation, Russia, Oxfordian
