= Crepidodera aureola =

Scientific classification
- Kingdom: Animalia
- Phylum: Arthropoda
- Class: Insecta
- Order: Coleoptera
- Suborder: Polyphaga
- Infraorder: Cucujiformia
- Family: Chrysomelidae
- Genus: Crepidodera
- Species: C. lamina

Binomial name
- Crepidodera lamina (Foudras, 1860)

Species of beetle

Crepidodera lamina is a species of flea beetle from Chrysomelidae family that can be found in France, Portugal, Spain, and North Africa.
