= Crepidodera digna =

Scientific classification
- Kingdom: Animalia
- Phylum: Arthropoda
- Class: Insecta
- Order: Coleoptera
- Suborder: Polyphaga
- Infraorder: Cucujiformia
- Family: Chrysomelidae
- Genus: Crepidodera
- Species: C. digna

Binomial name
- Crepidodera digna Parry, 1986

Species of beetle

Crepidodera digna is a species of flea beetle from the Chrysomelidae family that is endemic to Ontario, Canada.
