= Crepidodera browni =

Scientific classification
- Kingdom: Animalia
- Phylum: Arthropoda
- Class: Insecta
- Order: Coleoptera
- Suborder: Polyphaga
- Infraorder: Cucujiformia
- Family: Chrysomelidae
- Genus: Crepidodera
- Species: C. browni

Binomial name
- Crepidodera browni Parry, 1986

Species of beetle

Crepidodera browni is a species of flea beetle in the family Chrysomelidae. It is found in North America.
