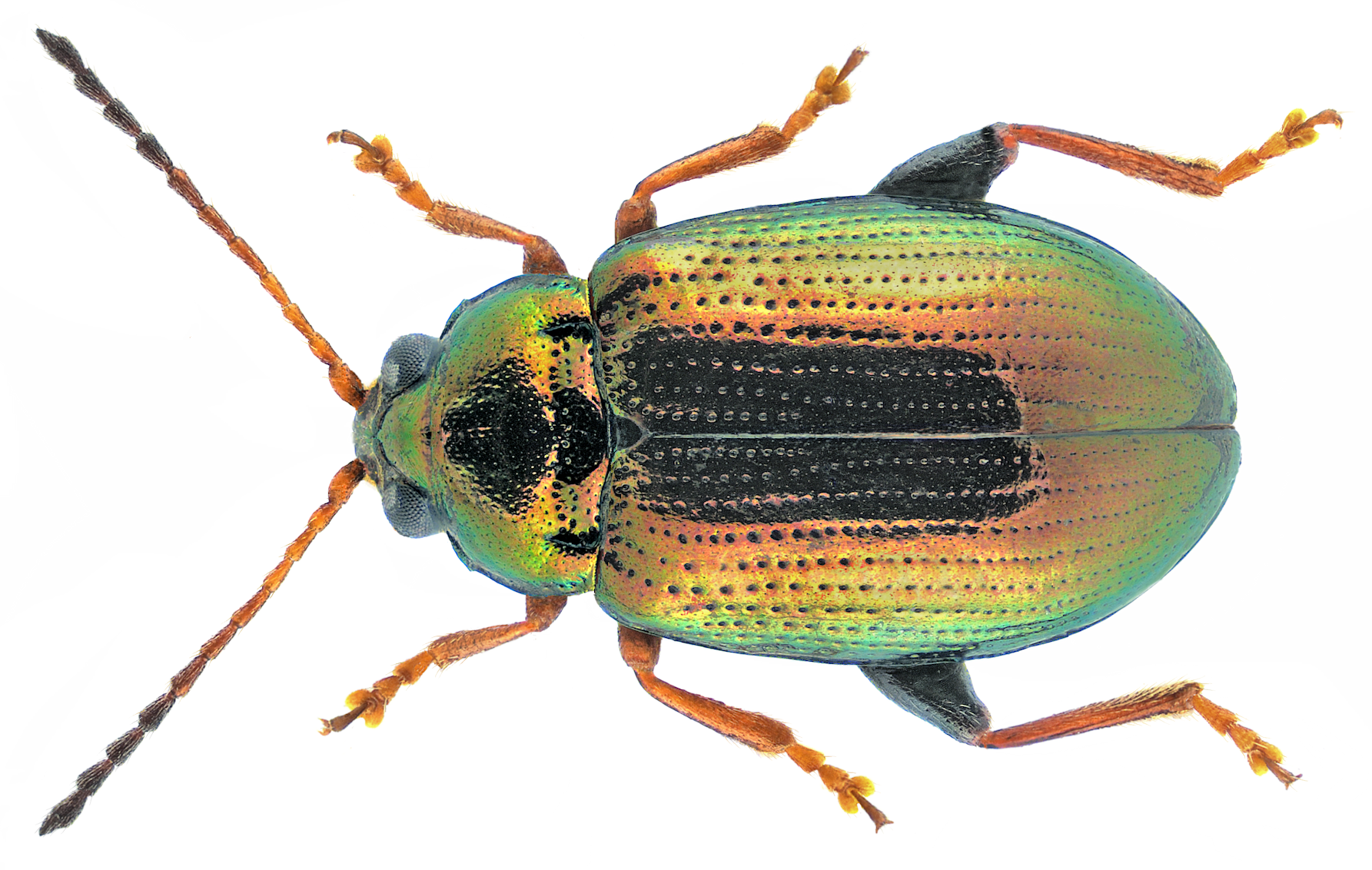
- Crepidodera lamina

Scientific classification
- Kingdom: Animalia
- Phylum: Arthropoda
- Class: Insecta
- Order: Coleoptera
- Suborder: Polyphaga
- Infraorder: Cucujiformia
- Family: Chrysomelidae
- Genus: Crepidodera
- Species: C. lamina

Binomial name
- Crepidodera lamina (Bedel, 1901)

= Crepidodera lamina =

Species of beetle

Crepidodera lamina is a species of flea beetles from the Chrysomelidae family that can be found in the Benelux, Italy, Spain, Ukraine, the Ex-Yugoslavian states, Central Europe, and the European part of Turkey.
