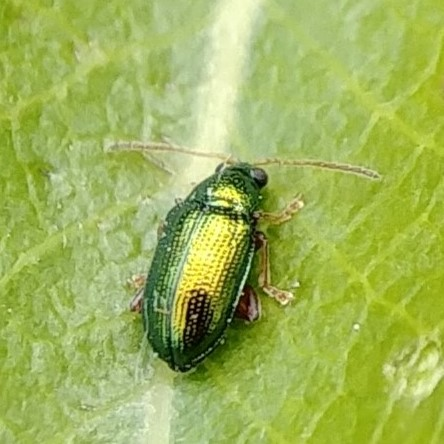

Scientific classification
- Kingdom: Animalia
- Phylum: Arthropoda
- Class: Insecta
- Order: Coleoptera
- Suborder: Polyphaga
- Infraorder: Cucujiformia
- Family: Chrysomelidae
- Genus: Crepidodera
- Species: C. nana

Binomial name
- Crepidodera nana (Say, 1824)

= Crepidodera nana =

Species of beetle

Crepidodera nana, also known as the tiny aspen flea beetle, is a species of flea beetle that belongs to the family Chrysomelidae. It is native to North America.
