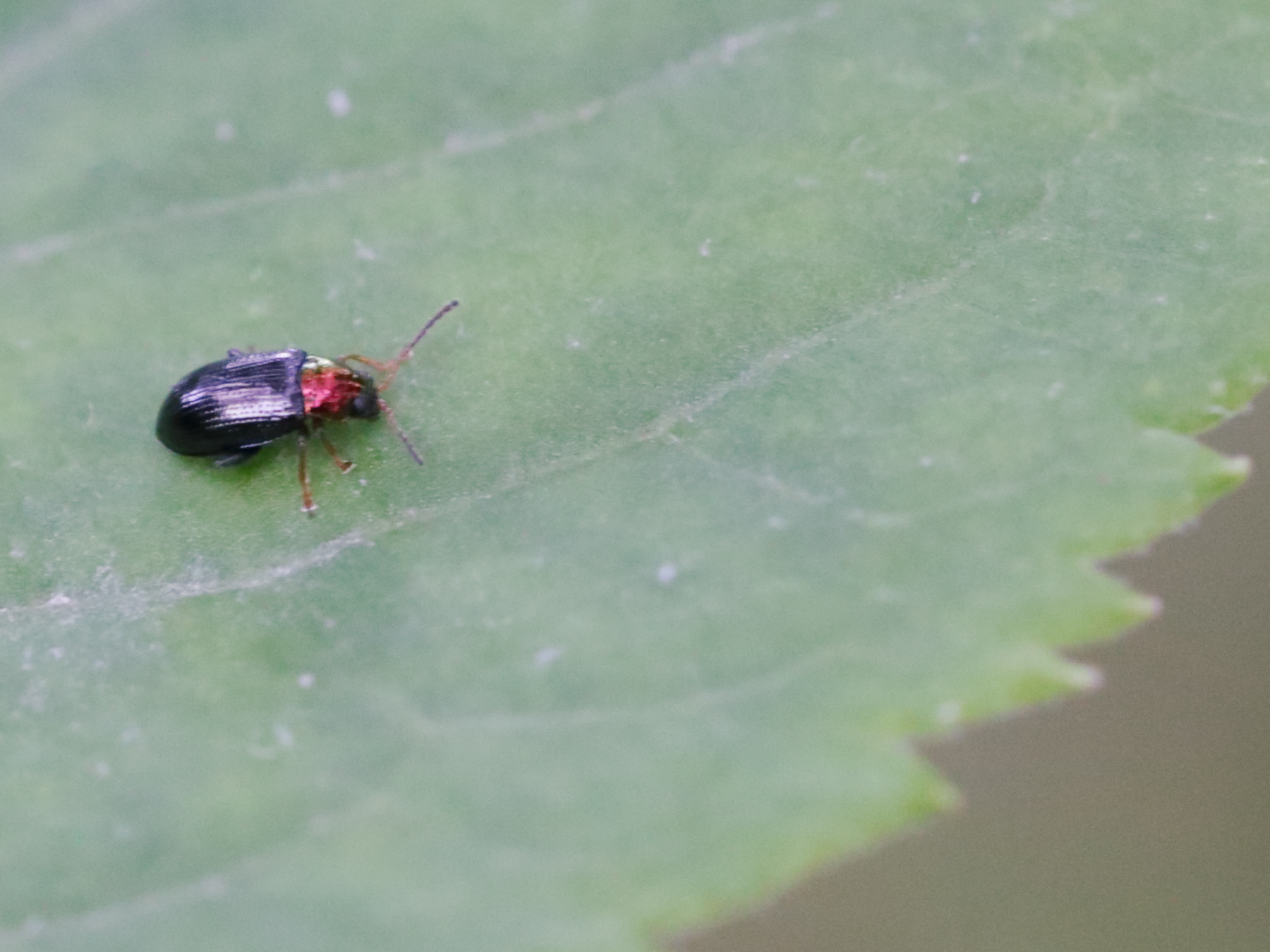

Scientific classification
- Kingdom: Animalia
- Phylum: Arthropoda
- Class: Insecta
- Order: Coleoptera
- Suborder: Polyphaga
- Infraorder: Cucujiformia
- Family: Chrysomelidae
- Genus: Crepidodera
- Species: C. nitidula

Binomial name
- Crepidodera nitidula (Linnaeus, 1758)

= Crepidodera nitidula =

Species of beetle

Crepidodera nitidula is a species of flea beetle from the Chrysomelidae family that can be found everywhere in Europe except for Albania, Andorra, Croatia, Greece, Ireland, Liechtenstein, San Marino, Spain, Vatican City, and various European islands.
