= Crepidodera nigricoxis =

Scientific classification
- Kingdom: Animalia
- Phylum: Arthropoda
- Class: Insecta
- Order: Coleoptera
- Suborder: Polyphaga
- Infraorder: Cucujiformia
- Family: Chrysomelidae
- Genus: Crepidodera
- Species: C. nigricoxis

Binomial name
- Crepidodera nigricoxis Allard, 1878

Species of beetle

Crepidodera nigricoxis is a species of flea beetle from the Chrysomelidae family that can be found in Albania, Austria, Bulgaria, Greece, North Macedonia, Romania, Slovakia, Yugoslavia, and the Near East.
