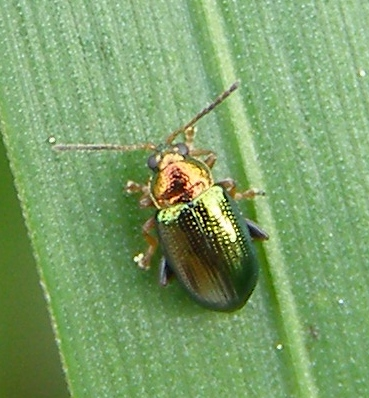

Scientific classification
- Domain: Eukaryota
- Kingdom: Animalia
- Phylum: Arthropoda
- Class: Insecta
- Order: Coleoptera
- Suborder: Polyphaga
- Infraorder: Cucujiformia
- Family: Chrysomelidae
- Genus: Crepidodera
- Species: C. aurata

Binomial name
- Crepidodera aurata (Marsham, 1802)

Synonyms
- Chrysomela aurata Marsham, 1802; Haltica pulchella (Stephens, 1834); Chalcoides aureola (Foudras, 1860); Haltica versicolor (Kutschera, 1860); Chalcoides aurata var. unicolor (Westhoff, 1881); Chalcoides aurata ab. nigra (Klenka, 1914); Chalcoides aurata var. subunicolor (Pic, 1918)

= Crepidodera aurata =

Species of beetle

Crepidodera aurata also known as willow flea beetle, is a species of flea beetles from the Chrysomelidae family, described by Marsham in 1802. It can be found in Palearctic realm and to the east of Korea. Can be found in Wales.

== Description ==
Adult species length is 2.5–2.5 millimetres (0.098–0.098 in), and is oval. Males of the species are black coloured, while females are green. Both have orange legs and antennas.

== Habitat and ecology ==
The beetle be found in every place where the willow grows. They hibernate under barks or debris, and can be found under logs and mud. The species live for 8–9 months. They are active during spring, particularly in May, and can be found on the ground where the tree have started throwing its buds. From May to June the species can be visibly seen on poplars and willows, whose leaves they feed on, by the round holes left as a result. Starting from June to August the beetles start mating. The females lay their eggs on the recently fed-on leaves of plants. The eggs' colour is yellow, and are spindle-like. The larva hatches in summer, with the size of 5–6 millimetres (0.20–0.24 in) in length, black coloured, and in resemblance of a slug. The larva feeds on the same plants that their previous generation used to feed on. The larva becomes adult within approximately three months, and the cycle continues from that point.
