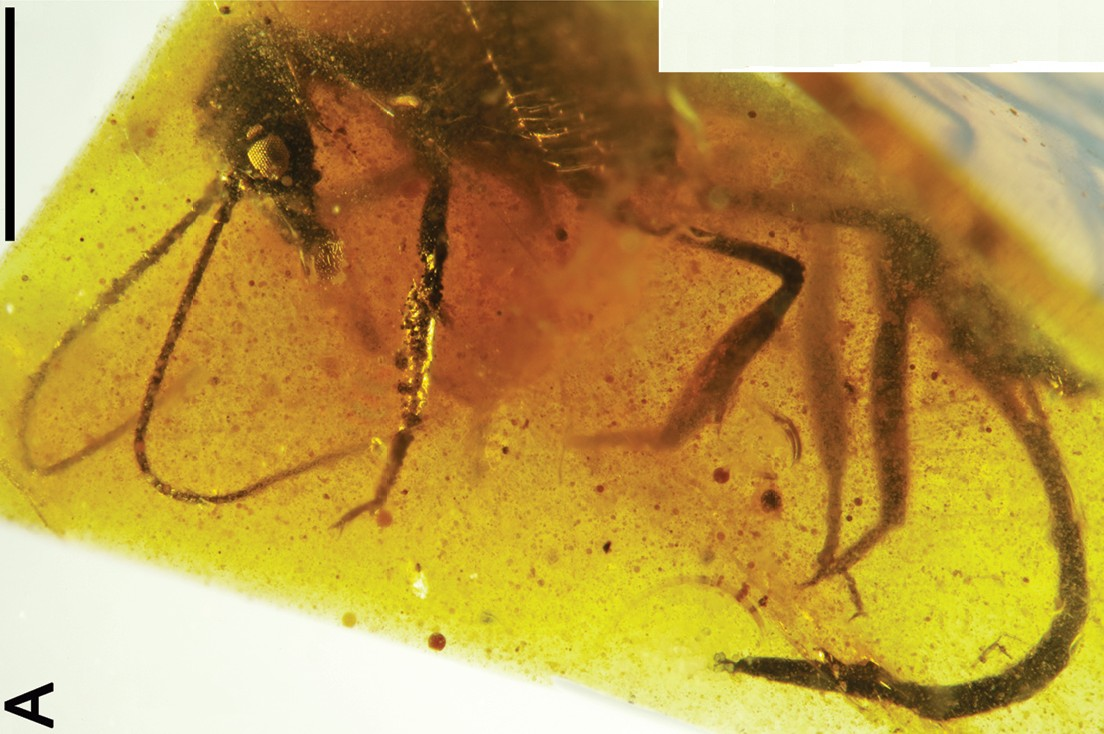

Scientific classification
- Domain: Eukaryota
- Kingdom: Animalia
- Phylum: Arthropoda
- Class: Insecta
- Order: Raphidioptera
- Family: †Mesoraphidiidae
- Genus: †Alavaraphidia
- Species: †A. imperterrita

Binomial name
- †Alavaraphidia imperterrita Pérez-de la Fuente, et al, 2012

= Alavaraphidia =

Alavaraphidia Temporal range: Albian

Genus of insects

Alavaraphidia is an extinct genus of snakefly in the family Mesoraphidiidae. The genus is solely known from an Early Cretaceous, Albian age, fossil amber found in Spain. Currently, the genus comprises a single species, Alavaraphidia imperterrita.

== History and classification ==
Alavaraphidia imperterrita is known only from one fossil, the holotype, specimen number MCNA 13608. The specimen is composed of a mostly complete adult insect with the majority of the wing missing. The body is positioned so a ventral view is shown and the dorsal sides are obscured. Despite the positioning and lack of preserved wings, enough details are present to show the specimen was not from a previously described genus. The specimen is included in a small piece of amber which lacks other major inclusions. The fossil was recovered from outcrops of the Escucha Formation in Moraza, part of the Province of Burgos in Northern Spain. Alavaraphidia was first studied by a group of paleoentomologists led by Ricardo Pérez-de la Fuente of the University of Barcelona and including Enrique Peñalver, Xavier Delclòs, and Michael S. Engel. Their 2012 type description of the new genus and species was published in the electronic journal ZooKeys. The genus name Alavaraphidia was coined by the researchers as a combination of the snakefly genus Raphidia and "Álava" which is in honor of the Álava amber deposits that preserved the specimen. The specific epithet imperterrita is from the Latin imperterritus meaning "fearless". The authors chose this as a reference to the unalterable nature of organisms trapped in amber. Alavaraphidia imperterrita is one of six described snakefly species found in the Albian deposits of Cantabria.

== Description ==
The lone specimen of Alavaraphidia imperterrita is a fairly well preserved partial adult female. Not including the ovipositor the overall body length is 5.7 millimetres (0.22 in) with a 1.2-millimetre-long head (0.047 in). Generally the body coloration is dark with a striped patterning on the legs. The rhomboidal head shows large compound eyes set midway along its length. There are three large ocelli placed to the rear of the head behind the compound eyes and antennae. The antennae are notably long, being composed of forty four flagellomeres which are each 1.5 times longer than they are wide. While mostly missing from the specimen, what is preserved of the wings shows they were hyaline with brown veins and very short, strong setae. The abdomen is 2.7 millimetres (0.11 in) long and sports a robust ovipositor that has dense annulations along its length. The ovipositor is approximately 2.7 millimetres (0.11 in) long, 0.2 millimetres (0.0079 in) thick, sporting short, stiff, sensory setae along its length and a club-shaped gonostyli.
