= Crepidodera peloponnesiaca =

Scientific classification
- Kingdom: Animalia
- Phylum: Arthropoda
- Class: Insecta
- Order: Coleoptera
- Suborder: Polyphaga
- Infraorder: Cucujiformia
- Family: Chrysomelidae
- Genus: Crepidodera
- Species: C. peloponnesiaca

Binomial name
- Crepidodera peloponnesiaca (Heikertinger, 1910)

Species of beetle

Crepidodera peloponnesiaca is a species of flea beetle from the Chrysomelidae family that is endemic to Greece.
