= Crepidodera solita =

Scientific classification
- Kingdom: Animalia
- Phylum: Arthropoda
- Class: Insecta
- Order: Coleoptera
- Suborder: Polyphaga
- Infraorder: Cucujiformia
- Family: Chrysomelidae
- Genus: Crepidodera
- Species: C. solita

Binomial name
- Crepidodera solita Parry, 1986

Species of beetle

Crepidodera solita is a species of flea beetles from Chrysomelidae family that is endemic to Ontario, Canada.
