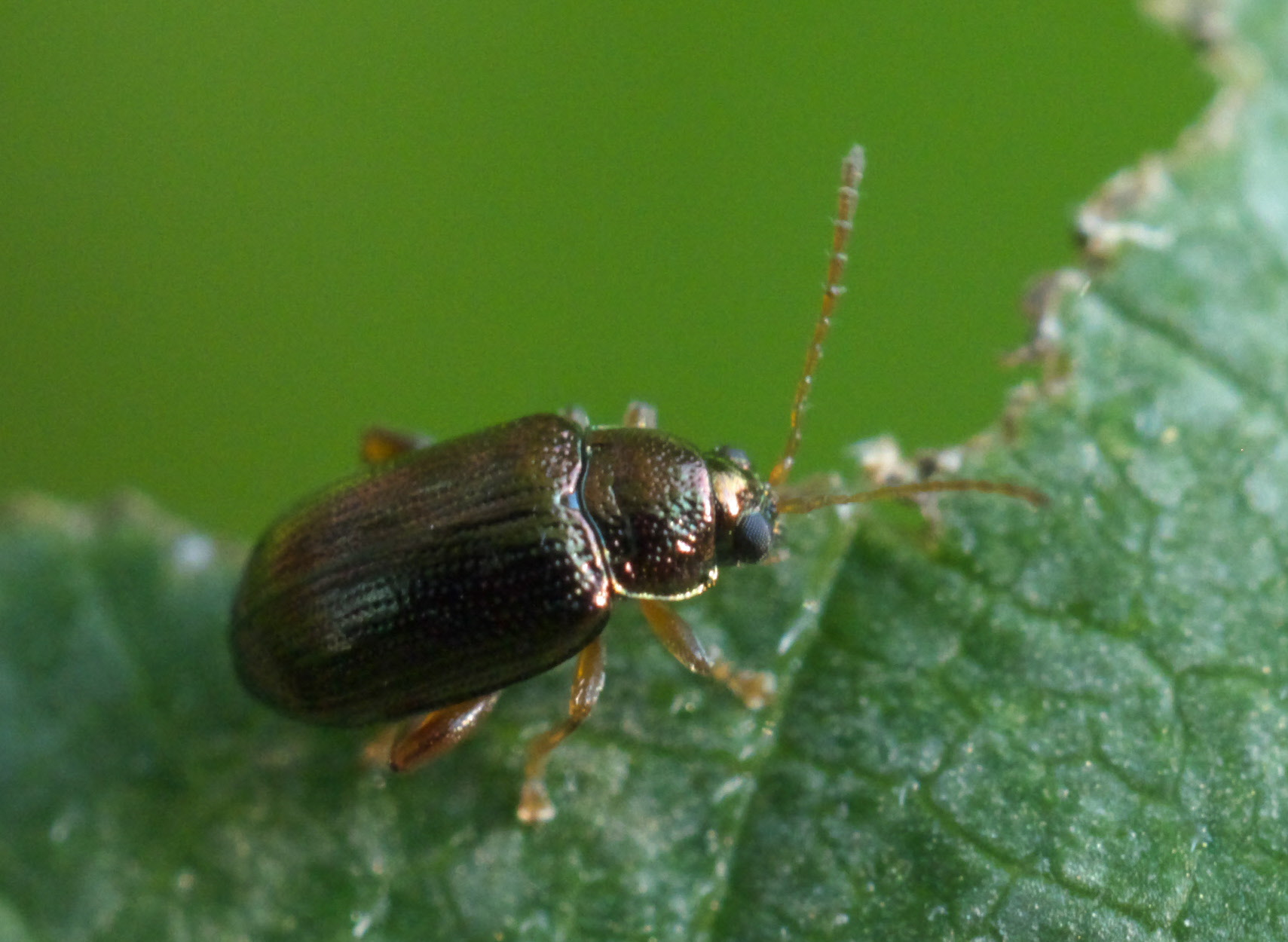

Scientific classification
- Kingdom: Animalia
- Phylum: Arthropoda
- Class: Insecta
- Order: Coleoptera
- Suborder: Polyphaga
- Infraorder: Cucujiformia
- Family: Chrysomelidae
- Subfamily: Galerucinae
- Tribe: Alticini
- Genus: Crepidodera; Chevrolat in Dejean, 1836

= Crepidodera =

Genus of beetles

Crepidodera is a genus of flea beetles in the family Chrysomelidae. There some 40 described species worldwide.

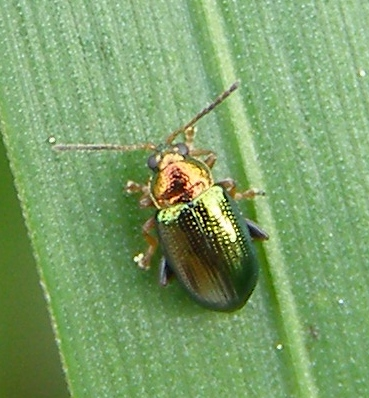
Female Crepidodera aurata

== Selected species ==
- Crepidodera aereola (J. L. LeConte, 1857)^{i c g b}
- Crepidodera aurata (Marsham, 1802)^{g}
- Crepidodera aurea (Geoffroy, 1785)^{g}
- Crepidodera aureola (Foudras, 1861)^{g}
- Crepidodera bella Parry, 1986^{i c g b}
- Crepidodera bicolor Boheman, 1859^{g}
- Crepidodera browni Parry, 1986^{i c g b}
- Crepidodera brullei Montrouzier, 1861^{g}
- †Crepidodera decolorata Nadein & Perkovsky, 2010^{g}
- Crepidodera decora Parry, 1986^{i c g}
- Crepidodera digna Parry, 1986^{i c g}
- Crepidodera fulvicornis (Fabricius, 1792)^{g}
- Crepidodera heikertingeri (Lazorko, 1974)^{i c g b}
- Crepidodera impressa (Fabricius, 1801)^{g}
- Crepidodera lamina (Bedel, 1901)^{g}
- Crepidodera longula Horn, 1889^{i c g}
- Crepidodera luminosa Parry, 1986^{i c g b}
- Crepidodera nana (Say, 1824)^{i c g b} (tiny aspen flea beetle)
- Crepidodera nigricoxis Allard, 1878^{g}
- Crepidodera nitidula (Linnaeus, 1758)^{g}
- Crepidodera opulenta J. L. LeConte, 1858^{i c g}
- Crepidodera peloponnesiaca (Heikertinger, 1910)^{g}
- Crepidodera plutus (Latreille, 1804)^{g}
- Crepidodera populivora Parry, 1986^{i c g b}
- Crepidodera sahalinensis Konstantinov, 1996
- Crepidodera sculpturata (Lazorko, 1974)^{i c g}
- Crepidodera solita Parry, 1986^{i c g b}
- Crepidodera spenceri (Lazorko, 1974)^{i c g}
- Crepidodera stypheliae Samuelson, 1984
- Crepidodera sublaevis
- †Crepidodera svetlanae Bukejs, 2014^{g}
- Crepidodera ussuriensis Konstantinov, 1996
- Crepidodera vaga Parry, 1986^{i c g}
- Crepidodera violacea F. E. Melsheimer, 1847^{i c g b}

Data sources: i = ITIS, c = Catalogue of Life, g = GBIF, b = Bugguide.net
