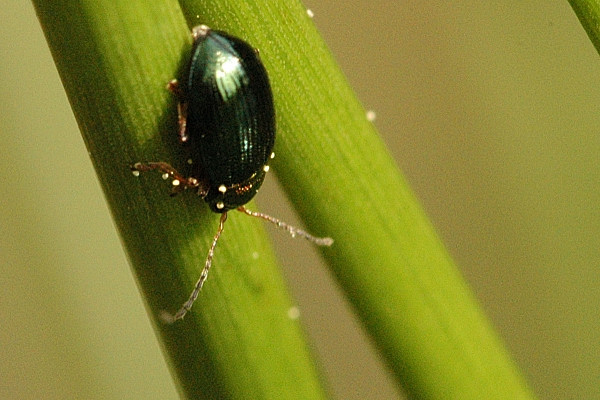

Scientific classification
- Kingdom: Animalia
- Phylum: Arthropoda
- Class: Insecta
- Order: Coleoptera
- Suborder: Polyphaga
- Infraorder: Cucujiformia
- Family: Chrysomelidae
- Genus: Crepidodera
- Species: C. fulvicornis

Binomial name
- Crepidodera fulvicornis (Fabricius, 1792)

= Crepidodera fulvicornis =

Species of beetle

Crepidodera fulvicornis is a species of flea beetle from the Chrysomelidae family that can be found everywhere in Europe, except for Albania, Andorra, Croatia, Moldova, San Marino, Vatican City, and various European islands.
