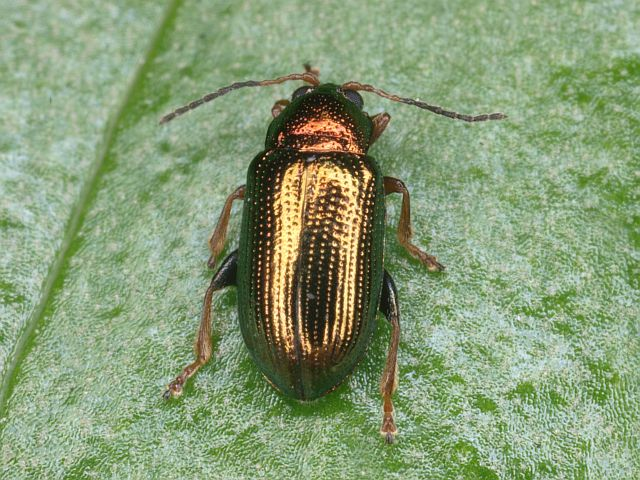

Scientific classification
- Kingdom: Animalia
- Phylum: Arthropoda
- Class: Insecta
- Order: Coleoptera
- Suborder: Polyphaga
- Infraorder: Cucujiformia
- Family: Chrysomelidae
- Genus: Crepidodera
- Species: C. plutus

Binomial name
- Crepidodera plutus (Latreille, 1804)

Synonyms
- Altica plutus Latreille, 1804; Crepidodera pluta (misspelling)

= Crepidodera plutus =

Species of beetle

Crepidodera plutus is a species of flea beetles from Chrysomelidae family that can be found everywhere in Europe, except Andorra, Finland, Ireland, Monaco, Moldova, Norway, San Marino, and Vatican City.
