= Crepidodera aereola =

Scientific classification
- Kingdom: Animalia
- Phylum: Arthropoda
- Class: Insecta
- Order: Coleoptera
- Suborder: Polyphaga
- Infraorder: Cucujiformia
- Family: Chrysomelidae
- Tribe: Alticini
- Genus: Crepidodera
- Species: C. aereola

Binomial name
- Crepidodera aereola (J. L. LeConte, 1857)

Species of beetle

Crepidodera aereola is a species of flea beetle in the family Chrysomelidae. It is found in North America.
