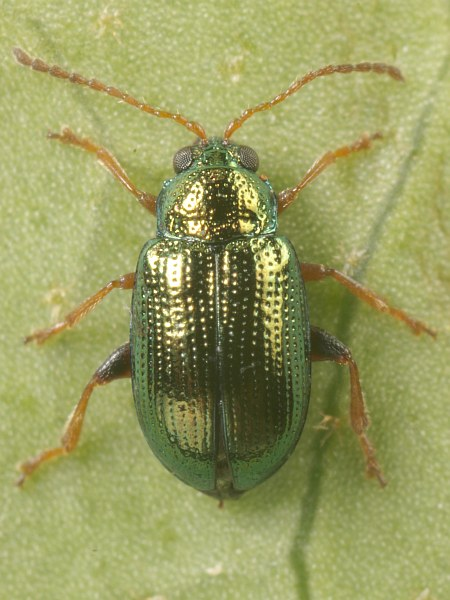

Scientific classification
- Kingdom: Animalia
- Phylum: Arthropoda
- Class: Insecta
- Order: Coleoptera
- Suborder: Polyphaga
- Infraorder: Cucujiformia
- Family: Chrysomelidae
- Genus: Crepidodera
- Species: C. aurea

Binomial name
- Crepidodera aurea (Geoffroy, 1785)

= Crepidodera aurea =

Species of beetle

Crepidodera aurea is a species of flea beetles from Chrysomelidae family that can be found in everywhere in Europe, except for Albania, Andorra, Finland, Ireland, Latvia, Moldova, Monaco, Norway, San Marino, Sweden, Vatican City, and various European islands.
