= Crepidodera bella =

Scientific classification
- Kingdom: Animalia
- Phylum: Arthropoda
- Class: Insecta
- Order: Coleoptera
- Suborder: Polyphaga
- Infraorder: Cucujiformia
- Family: Chrysomelidae
- Tribe: Alticini
- Genus: Crepidodera
- Species: C. bella

Binomial name
- Crepidodera bella Parry, 1986

Species of beetle

Crepidodera bella is a species of flea beetle in the family Chrysomelidae. It is found in North America.
