= Sociala =

Sociala Temporal range: Callovian–Albian

Scientific classification
- Kingdom: Animalia
- Phylum: Arthropoda
- Class: Insecta
- Order: Blattodea
- Infraorder: Isoptera
- Family: Socialidae
- Genus: Sociala; Vršanský, 2010

Type species
- Sociala perlucida Vršanský, 2010

Species
- Sociala perfecta Vršanský, 2010; Sociala borat Vršanský, 2024

Extinct genus of termite

Sociala is an extinct genus of stem-termite which lived from the mid-late Jurassic (Callovian to Kimmeridgian) to the early Cretaceous (Albian). This genus was named by Peter Vršanský in 2010, with the type species being Sociala perlucida from the Albian of France. In 2024, an earlier species, Sociala borat, was named from the Karabastau Formation in Kazakhstan, which would make this species the earliest known termite.

== Phylogeny ==
Cladogram after Vršanský (2010).

- Dictyoptera
  - Phylloblattidae
  - - - Cryptocercidae
      - - Polyphagidae
        - All other living Blattodea
    - - Certain Liberiblattinidae
      - - Certain Liberiblattinidae
        - - - Mantodea
            - Eadiidae
          - - Certain Liberiblattinidae
            - Skokidae
            - - Mastotermitidae
              - - Other living Isoptera
                - Socialidae
