= Mesozygiella =

Mesozygiella Temporal range: Early Cretaceous

Scientific classification
- Domain: Eukaryota
- Kingdom: Animalia
- Phylum: Arthropoda
- Subphylum: Chelicerata
- Class: Arachnida
- Order: Araneae
- Infraorder: Araneomorphae
- Family: Araneidae
- Genus: †Mesozygiella; Penney & Ortuño, 2006
- Species: †M. dunlopi

Binomial name
- †Mesozygiella dunlopi Penney & Ortuño, 2006

Extinct genus of spiders

Mesozygiella is an extinct genus of orb-weaving spider (family Araneidae), with one known species, Mesozygiella dunlopi, dating from the Early Cretaceous, making it the earliest orb-weaver yet discovered. Two male specimens of the species were found embedded in amber in Álava, northern Spain. The fossils provide direct evidence that the three major orb weaving families, namely Araneidae, Tetragnathidae and Uloboridae, had evolved by this time, about 140 million years ago. They probably originated during the Jurassic (200-145 million years ago). All three families very likely have a common origin.

The found males have a body length of two to almost three millimeters and eight eyes. The fossils are highly similar to recent Zygiella species, apart from the embolus originating medially rather than distally.

== Name ==
The genus name is a combination of meso, with the fossil stemming from the Mesozoic era, and the recent araneid genus Zygiella, to which the fossil is closely related. The species is named in honor of paleoarachnologist Jason A. Dunlop.
