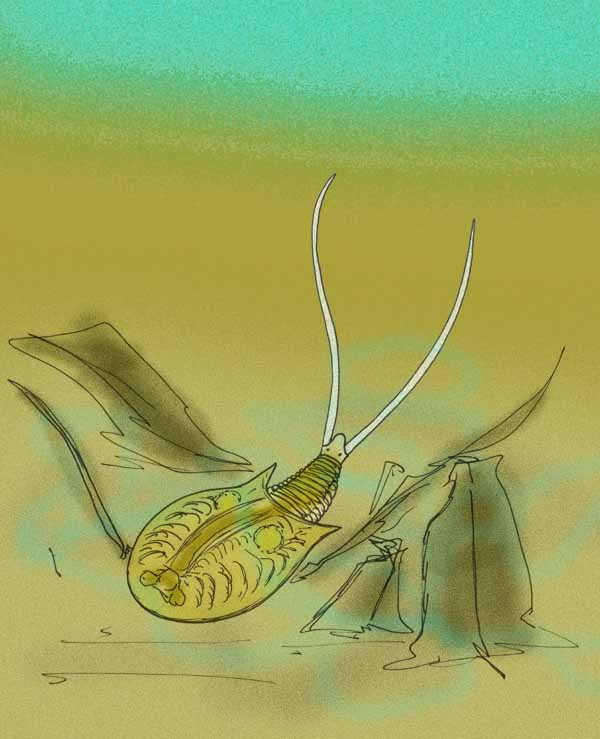
- Artist's reconstruction

Scientific classification
- Kingdom: Animalia
- Phylum: Arthropoda
- Class: Branchiopoda
- Order: Notostraca
- Genus: †Chenops; Hegna & Ren, 2010

Species
- C. oblongus (Oleynikov, 1968); C. yixianensis Hegna & Ren, 2010 (type)

= Chenops =

Chenops Temporal range: Barremian

Genus of small freshwater animals

Chenops is an extinct genus of notostracan which existed in the Yixian Formation, Inner Mongolia, and the Jehol fauna of China during the early Cretaceous period (Barremian age). The genus was erected by Thomas A. Hegna and Ren Dong in 2010 to describe the Yixian species, Chenops yixianensis. A second species, originally described as "Prolepidurus oblongus", from the Jehol fauna, was redescribed as C. oblongus.

As with the genus Jeholops, and unlike the modern genera Triops and Lepidurus, Chenops lacked eyes.

== See also ==
- Jeholops
