= Weiwoboa =

Weiwoboa Temporal range: Lower Eocene

Scientific classification
- Kingdom: Animalia
- Phylum: Arthropoda
- Class: Insecta
- Order: Hemiptera
- Suborder: Auchenorrhyncha
- Infraorder: Fulgoromorpha
- Superfamily: †Fulgoridioidea
- Family: †Weiwoboidae; Lin, Szwedo, Huang & Stroiński, 2010
- Genus: †Weiwoboa; Lin, Szwedo, Huang & Stroiński, 2010
- Species: †W. meridiana

Binomial name
- †Weiwoboa meridiana Lin, Szwedo, Huang & Stroiński, 2010

Extinct genus of true bugs

Weiwoboa is an extinct genus of insects which existed in what is now China during the early Eocene period. It was named by Lin Qibin, Jacek Szwedo, Huang Diying and Adam Stroiński in 2010, and the type species is Weiwoboa meridiana.
