= Jerseyempheria =

Jerseyempheria Temporal range: Cretaceous

Scientific classification
- Domain: Eukaryota
- Kingdom: Animalia
- Phylum: Arthropoda
- Class: Insecta
- Order: Psocodea
- Family: †Empheriidae
- Genus: †Jerseyempheria; Azar et al., 2010
- Species: †J. grimaldii

Binomial name
- †Jerseyempheria grimaldii Azar et al., 2010

Extinct genus of booklice

Jerseyempheria is an extinct genus of empheriid psocodean which existed in what is now New Jersey during the Cretaceous period. It was named by Dany Azar, André Nel and Julian F. Petrulevicius in 2010, and the type species is Jerseyempheria grimaldii.
