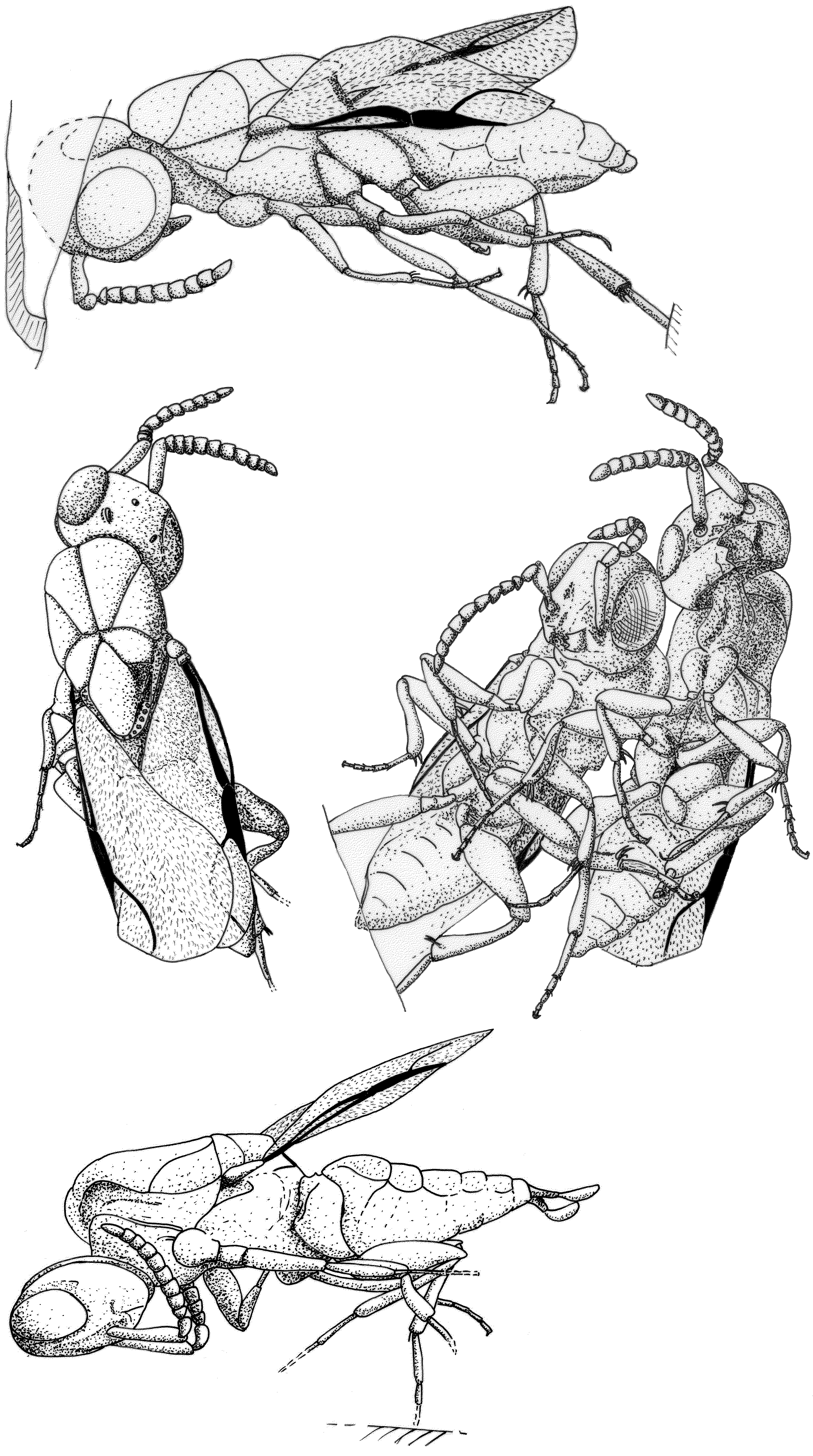
- Drawings of Radiophron

Scientific classification
- Kingdom: Animalia
- Phylum: Arthropoda
- Class: Insecta
- Order: Hymenoptera
- Superfamily: Chrysidoidea
- Family: †Radiophronidae; Ortega-Blanco et al., 2010

Genera
- Radiophron; Microcostaphron

= Radiophronidae =

Radiophronidae Temporal range: Albian

Extinct family of wasps

Radiophronidae is an extinct family of wasps known from two genera found in Cretaceous (Albian) aged amber from Spain. While originally classified in Ceraphronoidea, they were later considered to probably be members of Chrysidoidea.
