= Tyulkinia =

Tyulkinia Temporal range: Lower Permian

Scientific classification
- Kingdom: Animalia
- Phylum: Arthropoda
- Class: Insecta
- Order: Grylloblattida
- Suborder: †Protoperlina
- Family: †Camptoneuritidae
- Genus: †Tyulkinia Aristov, Storozhenko & Cui, 2010
- Species: †T. bashkuevi

Binomial name
- †Tyulkinia bashkuevi Aristov, Storozhenko & Cui, 2010

Extinct genus of insects

Tyulkinia is an extinct genus of camptoneuritid insects which existed in what is now Russia during the lower Permian period (Kungurian age). It was named by Danil S. Aristov, Sergey Yu. Storozhenko, Cui Yingying in 2010, and the type species is Tyulkinia bashkuevi. It takes its name from Tyulkino, Russia.
