= Raptorapax =

Raptorapax Temporal range: Early Cretaceous

Scientific classification
- Domain: Eukaryota
- Kingdom: Animalia
- Phylum: Arthropoda
- Class: Insecta
- Order: Neuroptera
- Family: Rhachiberothidae
- Subfamily: †Paraberothinae
- Genus: †Raptorapax; Petrulevicius et al., 2010
- Species: †R. terribilissima

Binomial name
- †Raptorapax terribilissima Petrulevicius et al., 2010

Extinct genus of insects

Raptorapax is an extinct genus of rhachiberothid which existed in what is now Lebanon during the early Cretaceous period. It was named by Julian F. Petrulevicius, Dany Azar and André Nel in 2010, and the type species is Raptorapax terribilissima. It was found in Lebanese amber.
