= Manobiomorpha =

Manobiomorpha Temporal range: Late Eocene

Scientific classification
- Kingdom: Animalia
- Phylum: Arthropoda
- Class: Insecta
- Order: Coleoptera
- Suborder: Polyphaga
- Infraorder: Cucujiformia
- Family: Chrysomelidae
- Subfamily: Galerucinae
- Tribe: Alticini
- Genus: †Manobiomorpha; Nadein & Perkovsky, 2010
- Species: †M. eocenica

Binomial name
- †Manobiomorpha eocenica Nadein & Perkovsky, 2010

Extinct genus of beetles

Manobiomorpha is an extinct genus of flea beetles described from the late Eocene Rovno amber of Ukraine. It was named by Konstantin Nadein and Evgeny Perkovsky in 2010, and the type species is Manobiomorpha eocenica.
