= Crepidodera decolorata =

Crepidodera decolorata Temporal range: Late Eocene

Scientific classification
- Kingdom: Animalia
- Phylum: Arthropoda
- Class: Insecta
- Order: Coleoptera
- Suborder: Polyphaga
- Infraorder: Cucujiformia
- Family: Chrysomelidae
- Genus: Crepidodera
- Species: †C. decolorata

Binomial name
- †Crepidodera decolorata Nadein & Perkovsky, 2010

Extinct species of beetle

Crepidodera decolorata is an extinct species of flea beetles described from the late Eocene Rovno amber of Ukraine.
