= Camptoneurites =

Camptoneurites Temporal range: Middle Permian

Scientific classification
- Kingdom: Animalia
- Phylum: Arthropoda
- Class: Insecta
- Order: Grylloblattida
- Suborder: †Protoperlina
- Family: †Camptoneuritidae
- Genus: †Camptoneurites Martynov, 1928

Genus of insects

Camptoneurites is an extinct insect which existed in Russia during the middle Permian period.
