= Mendozachorista =

Mendozachorista Temporal range: Norian ~221–206 Ma

Scientific classification
- Kingdom: Animalia
- Phylum: Arthropoda
- Class: Insecta
- Order: incertae sedis
- Family: Mendozachoristidae Brauckmann et al. 2010
- Genus: Mendozachorista Brauckmann et al. 2010
- Species: M. volkheimeri

Binomial name
- Mendozachorista volkheimeri Brauckmann et al. 2010

Extinct genus of insects

Mendozachorista is an extinct genus of insect which existed in Argentina during the Late Triassic period. It was named by Carsten Brauckmann, Oscar F. Gallego, Norbert Hauschke, Rafael G. Martins-Neto, Elke Groening, Jan-M. Ilger and María B. Lara in 2010, and the type and only species is Mendozachorista volkheimeri. It is known only from an impression of a Mecopterida-like wing found in the Llantenes Formation in Mendoza Province.
