= Psyllototus =

Psyllototus Temporal range: Late Eocene

Scientific classification
- Kingdom: Animalia
- Phylum: Arthropoda
- Class: Insecta
- Order: Coleoptera
- Suborder: Polyphaga
- Infraorder: Cucujiformia
- Family: Chrysomelidae
- Subfamily: Galerucinae
- Tribe: Alticini
- Genus: †Psyllototus; Nadein & Perkovsky, 2010

Type species
- †Psyllototus progenitor Nadein & Perkovsky, 2010

Extinct genus of beetles

Psyllototus is an extinct genus of flea beetles described from the late Eocene Rovno amber of Ukraine, and from the Baltic amber of Russia and Denmark. It was named by Konstantin Nadein and Evgeny Perkovsky in 2010, and the type species is Psyllototus progenitor. In 2016, a newly described extant flea beetle genus from Bolivia, Chanealtica, was found to be most similar to Psyllototus, based on the characters available for observation.

== Species ==
The genus includes four species:

- Psyllototus doeberli Bukejs & Nadein, 2014
- Psyllototus groehni Bukejs & Nadein, 2013
- Psyllototus progenitor Nadein & Perkovsky, 2010
- Psyllototus viking Nadein, 2015
