= Les Figons =

Coordinates: 43.561°N 5.379°E

Les Figons (French pronunciation: [le fiɡɔ̃]) is a hamlet west of Aix-en-Provence in France. It is part of the commune of Éguilles. In 1820, there were 172 inhabitants.
