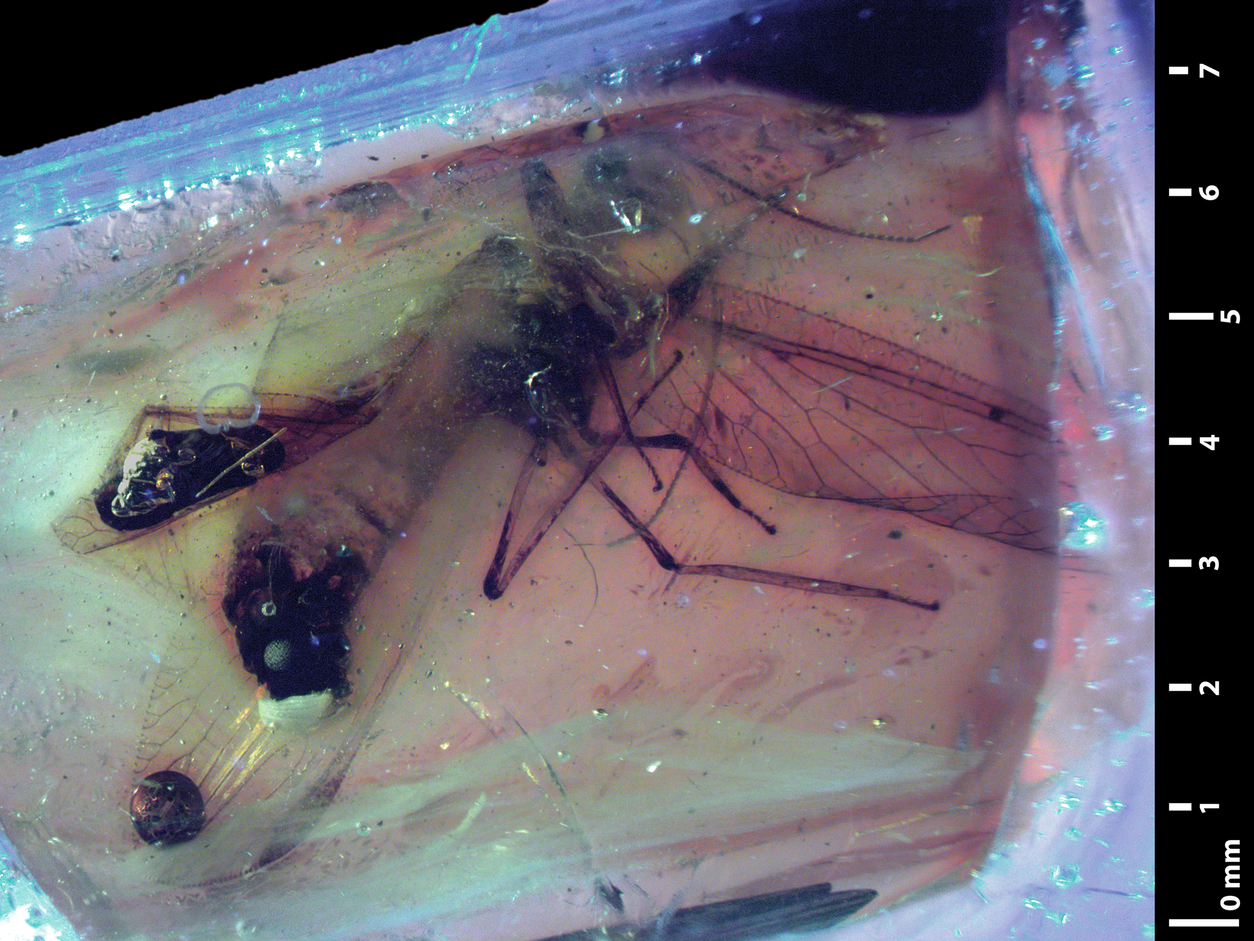
- The Oisea celinea holotype in Oise amber
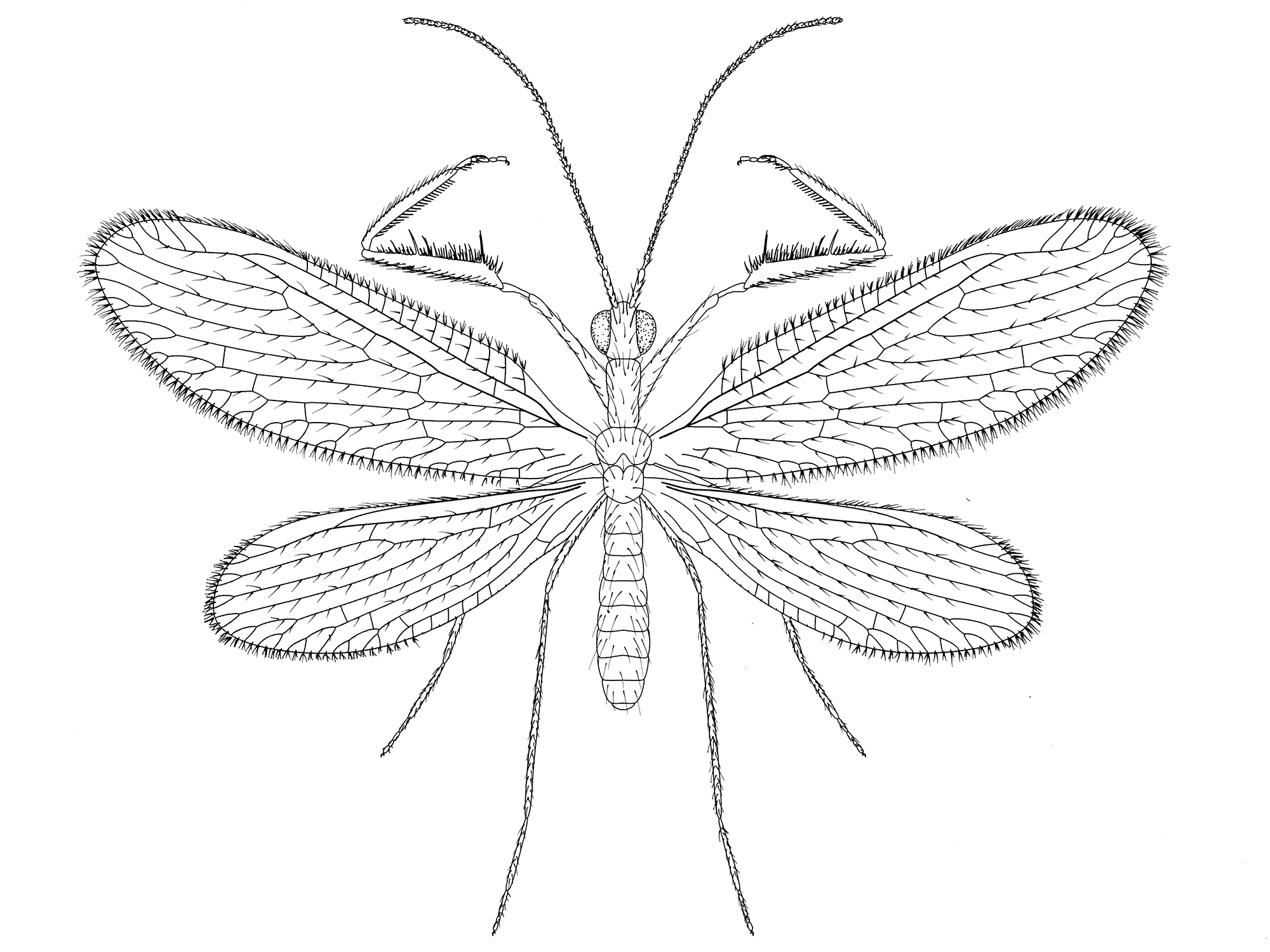
- Reconstruction of Uranoberotha chariessa

Scientific classification
- Kingdom: Animalia
- Phylum: Arthropoda
- Clade: Pancrustacea
- Class: Insecta
- Order: Neuroptera
- Clade: Euneuroptera
- Superfamily: Mantispoidea
- Family: Rhachiberothidae; Tjeder, 1959

Genera
- Hoelzeliella; Mucroberotha; Rhachiberotha; Rhachiella and see text

= Rhachiberothidae =

Rhachiberothidae Temporal range: Barremian–Present

Family of insects

Rhachiberothidae, sometimes called thorny lacewings, are a family of winged insects in the order Neuroptera. The family has only 14 extant species in four genera found in Sub-Saharan Africa, but has a diverse fossil record extending back to the Early Cretaceous in Lebanon (then part of North Gondwana), Eurasia and North America. Like the closely related Mantispidae members of the group possess raptorial forelegs, which probably only evolved once in the common ancestor of the groups.

Long included in the Berothidae (beaded lacewings), they are usually considered a separate family by current authors. Another closely related group are the mantidflies (Mantispidae), and at least some of the probably paraphyletic group of fossil forms collectively called "Mesithonidae" also seem to be quite close.

== Taxonomy ==
- Rhachiberothidae Tjeder, 1959
  - †Paraberothinae Nel et al., 2005
    - †Acanthoberotha Nakamine et al, 2020 Burmese amber, Late Cretaceous (Cenomanian)
    - †Albertoberotha McKellar & Engel, 2009 Canadian amber, Late Cretaceous (Campanian)
    - †Alboberotha Nel et al., 2005 Charentese amber, France, Cenomanian
    - †Astioberotha Nakamine et al, 2020 Burmese amber, Cenomanian
    - †Chimerhachiberotha Nel et al., 2005 Lebanese amber, Early Cretaceous (Barremian)
    - †Creagroparaberotha Makarkin, 2015 Burmese amber, Cenomanian
    - †Eorhachiberotha Engel, 2004 Burmese amber, Cenomanian
    - †Kujiberotha Nakamine & Yamamoto, 2018 Kuji amber, Japan, Late Cretaceous (Santonian)
    - †Micromantispa Shi et al., 2015 Burmese amber, Cenomanian
    - †Paraberotha Whalley, 1980 Lebanese amber, Barremian
    - †Raptorapax Petrulevicius et al., 2010 Lebanese amber, Barremian
    - †Retinoberotha Schlüter, 1978 Bezonnais amber, France, Cenomanian
    - †Rhachibermissa Grimaldi, 2000 New Jersey amber, Late Cretaceous (Turonian)
    - †Scoloberotha Engel & Grimaldi, 2008 Burmese amber, Cenomanian
    - †Spinoberotha Nel et al., 2005 Lebanese amber, Barremian
    - †Stygioberotha Nakamine et al, 2020 Burmese amber, Cenomanian
    - †Uranoberotha Nakamine et al, 2020 Burmese amber, Cenomanian
  - Rhachiberothinae Tjeder, 1959
    - Hoelzeliella Aspöck & Aspöck, 1997
    - Mucroberotha Tjeder, 1959
    - Rhachiberotha Tjeder, 1959
    - Rhachiella Aspöck, Aspöck, Johnson, Donga & Duelli, 2020
    - †Whalfera Engel, 2004 Baltic amber, Eocene
  - Incertae sedis
    - †Oisea Nel et al., 2005 Oise amber, France, Eocene (Ypresian)
    - †Paradoxoberotha Nakamine et al. 2022 Burmese amber, Myanmar, Cenomanian
