= Strashilidae =

Strashilidae Temporal range: 167–145 Ma Middle Jurassic – Upper Jurassic

Scientific classification
- Kingdom: Animalia
- Phylum: Arthropoda
- Class: Insecta
- Order: Diptera
- Suborder: Nematocera
- Family: †Strashilidae; Rasnitsyn, 1992

Genera
- †Strashila; †Vosila

Extinct family of flies

Strashilidae is an extinct family of Jurassic flies from Siberia and China. They were originally believed to represent a distinct order called Nakridletia, but subsequent research determined that they were nematoceran flies related to the extant family Nymphomyiidae, and two of the species (and genera) in the group were determined to be synonyms. The family now comprises two species in the genus Strashila and one in the genus Vosila. The original hypothesis was that the insects were wingless and were probably ectoparasites of pterosaurs, mostly due to their enlarged hind legs, which were theorised as useful for grasping hair and feathers; however, additional fossils showed that both sexes had deciduous wings, and that only males had enlarged hind legs, used to grasp the females during mating, and were not parasitic, instead having an aquatic or amphibious life history, as evidenced by the adults retaining of gills, with ephemeral adults that died soon after mating,

== See also ==
- Image of Strashila incredibilis.
