= Vosila =

Vosila Temporal range: Callovian–Oxfordian

Scientific classification
- Domain: Eukaryota
- Kingdom: Animalia
- Phylum: Arthropoda
- Class: Insecta
- Order: Diptera
- Family: Vosilidae
- Genus: †Vosila; Vršanský, Ren & Shih, 2010
- Species: †V. sinensis

Binomial name
- †Vosila sinensis Vrsansky & Ren, 2010

Extinct genus of flies

Vosila is an extinct genus of flies in the family Vosilidae. There is one described species in Vosila, V. sinensis. found in the Callovian aged Daohugou Bed, Inner Mongolia, China
