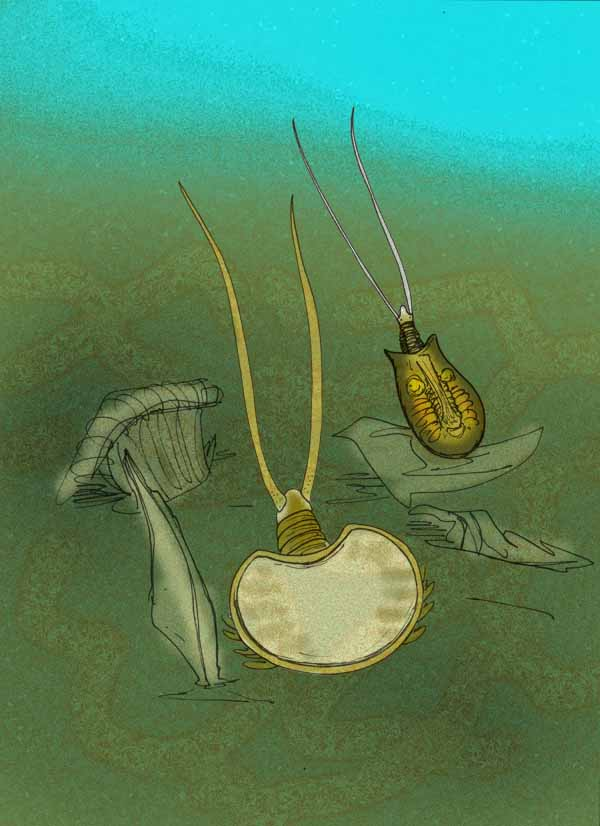
- Jeholops (left), Chenops {right}

Scientific classification
- Kingdom: Animalia
- Phylum: Arthropoda
- Class: Branchiopoda
- Order: Notostraca
- Genus: †Jeholops; Hegna & Ren, 2010
- Species: †J. hongi

Binomial name
- †Jeholops hongi Hegna & Ren, 2010

= Jeholops =

Jeholops hongi Temporal range: Barremian

Genus of small freshwater animals

Jeholops is an extinct genus of notostracan which existed in the Yixian Formation, inner Mongolia, China during the early Cretaceous period (Barremian age). It was described by Thomas A. Hegna and Ren Dong in 2010, and the only species is Jeholops hongi.

As with the genus Chenops, and unlike the modern genera Triops or Lepidurus, Jeholops lacked eyes.

== See also ==
- Chenops
