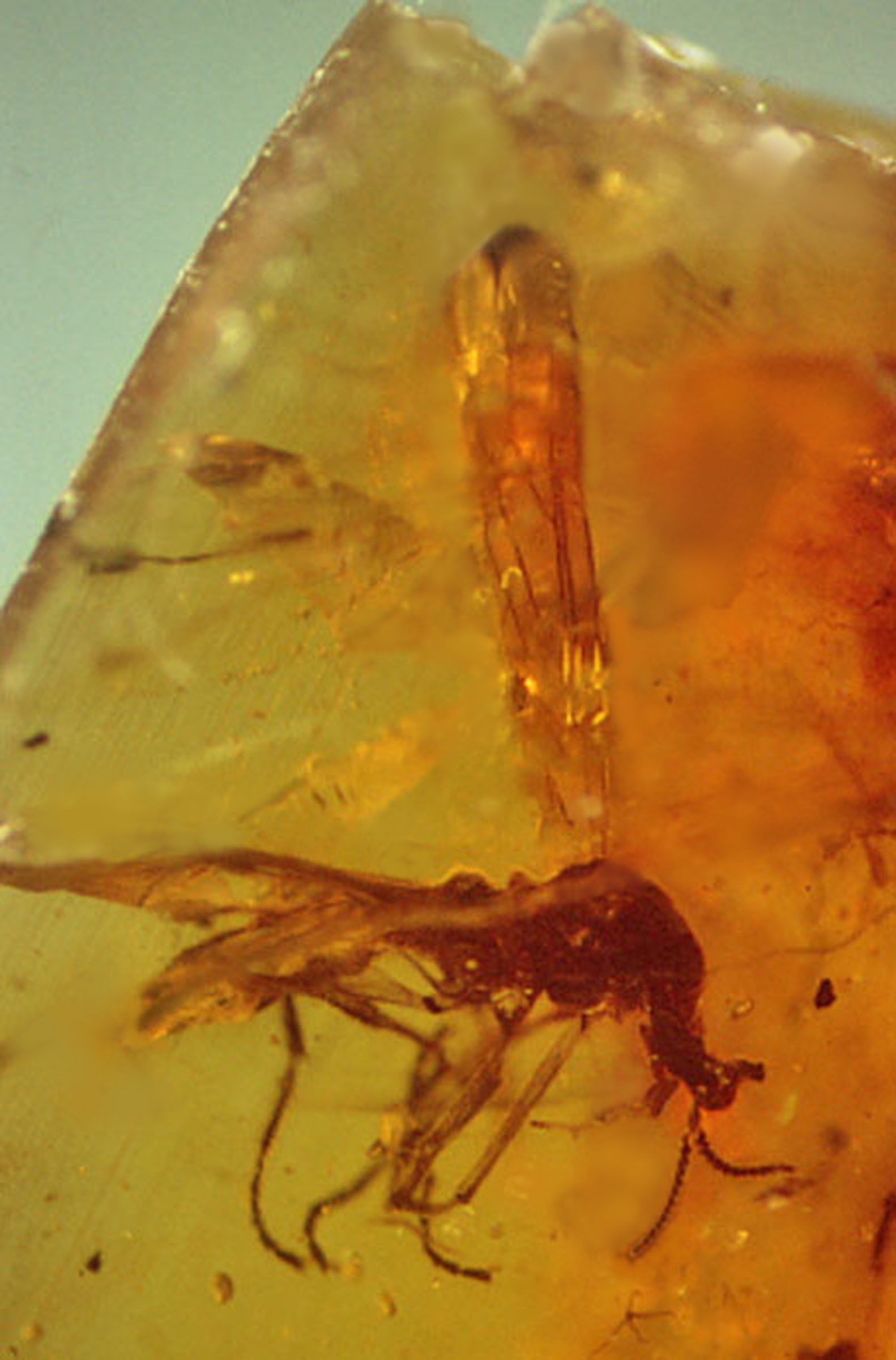
- holotype fossil

Scientific classification
- Kingdom: Animalia
- Phylum: Arthropoda
- Class: Insecta
- Order: Diptera
- Superfamily: Bibionoidea
- Family: Bibionidae
- Genus: †Cascoplecia; Poinar, 2010
- Species: †C. insolitis

Binomial name
- †Cascoplecia insolitis Poinar, 2010

= Cascoplecia =

Cascoplecia Temporal range: Late Aptian to Early Cenomanian

Extinct species of fly

Cascoplecia insolitis, rarely known as the unicorn fly, is an extinct dipteran that lived in the Cretaceous. The type specimen was found in Burmese amber. George Poinar Jr., who described the fossil, placed the genus into a new family Cascopleciidae. One of the defining characteristics of Cascoplecia is the presence of three ocelli raised on an extended, horn-like protuberance. The distinctiveness of the family was questioned by other authors, and the genus has been subsequently transferred to the family Bibionidae.

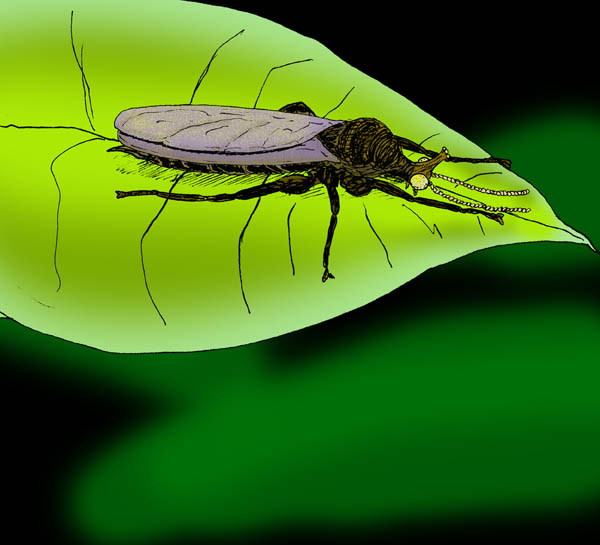
reconstruction
