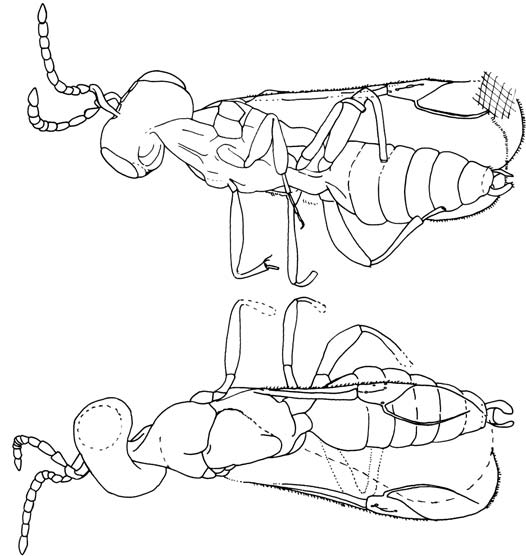
- Drawing of Microcostaphron

Scientific classification
- Kingdom: Animalia
- Phylum: Arthropoda
- Class: Insecta
- Order: Hymenoptera
- Family: †Radiophronidae
- Genus: †Microcostaphron; Ortega-Blanco, Rasnitsyn & Delclòs, 2010
- Species: †M. parvus

Binomial name
- †Microcostaphron parvus Ortega-Blanco, Rasnitsyn & Delclòs, 2010

= Microcostaphron =

Microcostaphron Temporal range: Albian

Extinct genus of wasps

Microcostaphron parvus is an extinct species of wasp belonging to the extinct family Radiophronidae which existed in Spain during the early Cretaceous period. Only a single specimen is known, which was found near Peñacerrada-Urizaharra in the Basque Country.
