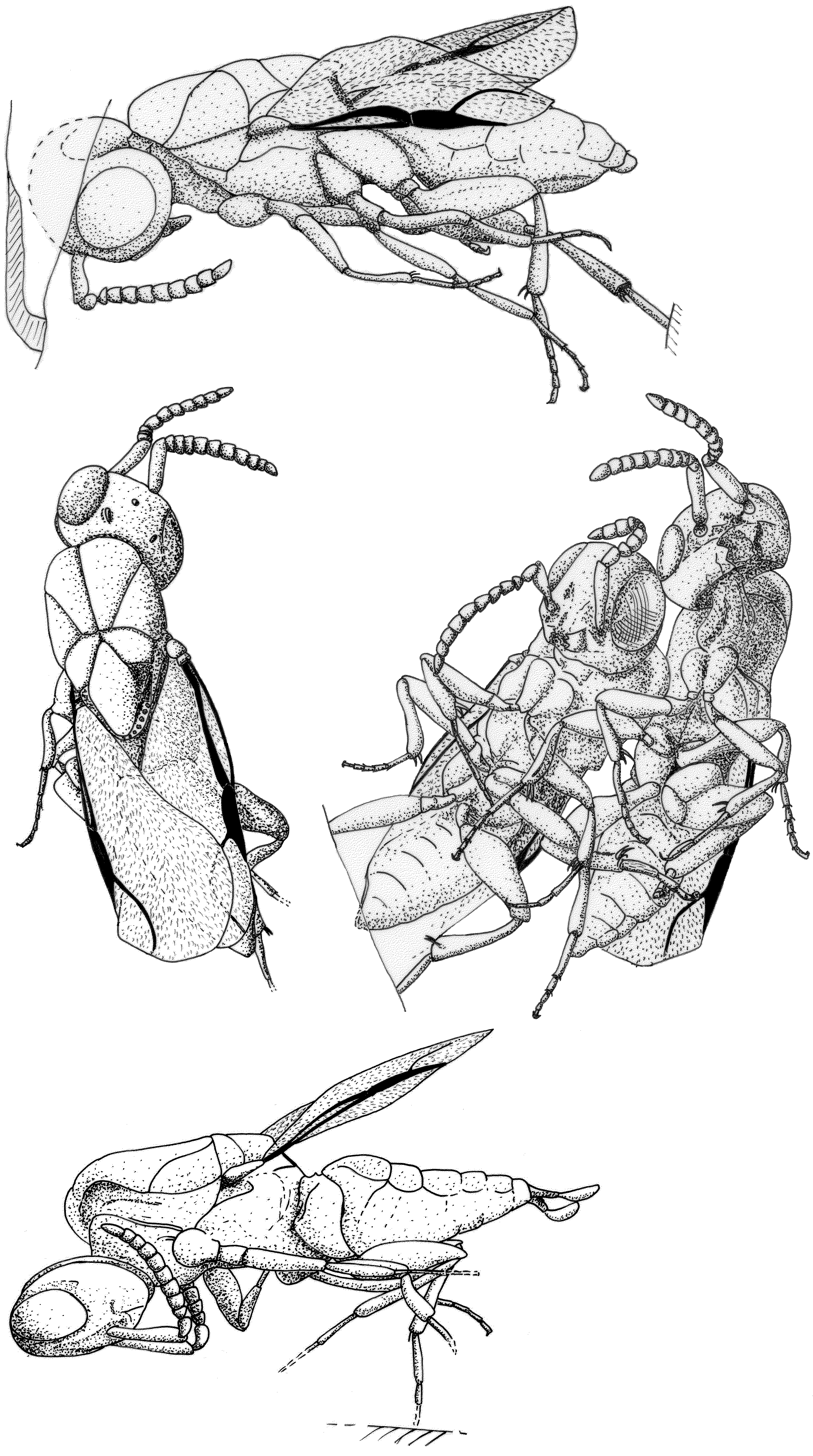
- Drawings of Radiophron

Scientific classification
- Kingdom: Animalia
- Phylum: Arthropoda
- Class: Insecta
- Order: Hymenoptera
- Family: †Radiophronidae
- Genus: †Radiophron; Ortega-Blanco, Rasnitsyn & Delclòs, 2010
- Species: †R. ibericus

Binomial name
- †Radiophron ibericus Ortega-Blanco, Rasnitsyn & Delclòs, 2010

= Radiophron =

Radiophron Temporal range: Albian

Extinct genus of wasps

Radiophron is an extinct genus of wasp which existed in Spain during the early Cretaceous period. The only species is Radiophron ibericus. It is a member of the extinct family Radiophronidae.
