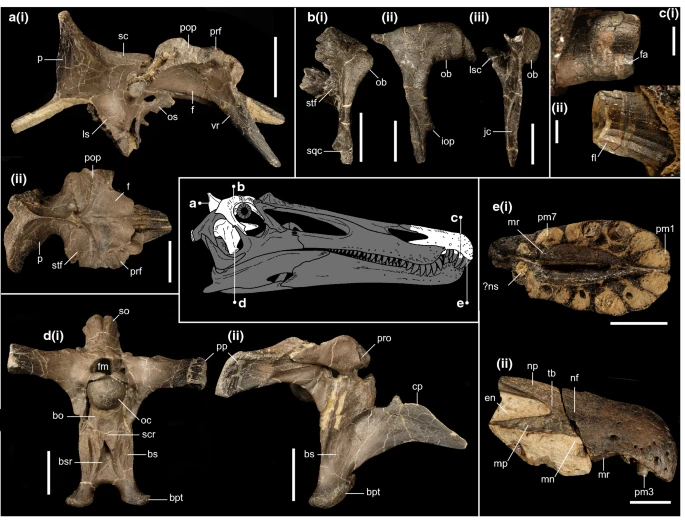
- Holotype skull fragments

Scientific classification
- Kingdom: Animalia
- Phylum: Chordata
- Class: Reptilia
- Clade: Dinosauria
- Clade: Saurischia
- Clade: Theropoda
- Family: †Spinosauridae
- Clade: †Ceratosuchopsini
- Genus: †Ceratosuchops; Barker et al., 2021

Type species
- †Ceratosuchops inferodios Barker et al., 2021

Synonyms
- ?Riparovenator milnerae Barker et al., 2021

= Ceratosuchops =

Ceratosuchops Temporal range: Early Cretaceous (Barremian), 125 Ma

Genus of spinosaurid dinosaur

Ceratosuchops (meaning "horned crocodile face") is a genus of spinosaurid from the Early Cretaceous (Barremian) Wessex Formation of Britain. The type species is Ceratosuchops inferodios, known from skull fragments (a snout tip and a partial braincase) recovered between 2013–2017 from Chilton Chine on the Isle of Wight, and housed at the Dinosaur Isle Museum in Sandown. It was named in 2021 by a team consisting of Chris Tijani Barker, Darren Naish, David W. E. Hone, and colleagues, alongside Riparovenator milnerae.

Ceratosuchops is notably distinguished from its close relatives by the presence of a bony lump, known as a boss, which extends from each postorbital bone, hence its genus name. These bosses may have served a function in signalling, or, like similar structures in other species, might have been involved in combat behaviours. The size of C. inferodios is difficult to deduce, given the fragmentary nature of its remains, though it may have been similar to that of Baryonyx. Analysis of the braincase and neuroanatomy of C. inferodios suggests that it was very similar to other basal tetanurans, and that baryonychines likely underwent few changes to their brain anatomy as a result of their shift from terrestrial to aquatic prey.

Ceratosuchops forms part of the tribe Ceratosuchopsini, alongside Riparovenator and the later, north African Suchomimus, and to the exclusion of the other Wessex baryonychine (Baryonyx). The presence of up to three ecologically similar taxa (Baryonyx, Ceratosuchops, and Riparovenator) in the same environment led the describers of C. inferodios to suggest that, at minimum, it and Riparovenator were likely ecologically distinct in some way. However, it was tentatively suggested in 2022 by Paul Sereno and colleagues that C. inferodios and Riparovenator may have been the same taxon, and that the differences between the two were the result of individual variation; accordingly, when conducting a phylogenetic analysis of Spinosauridae, the name C. inferodios was used for both.

== Discovery and naming ==
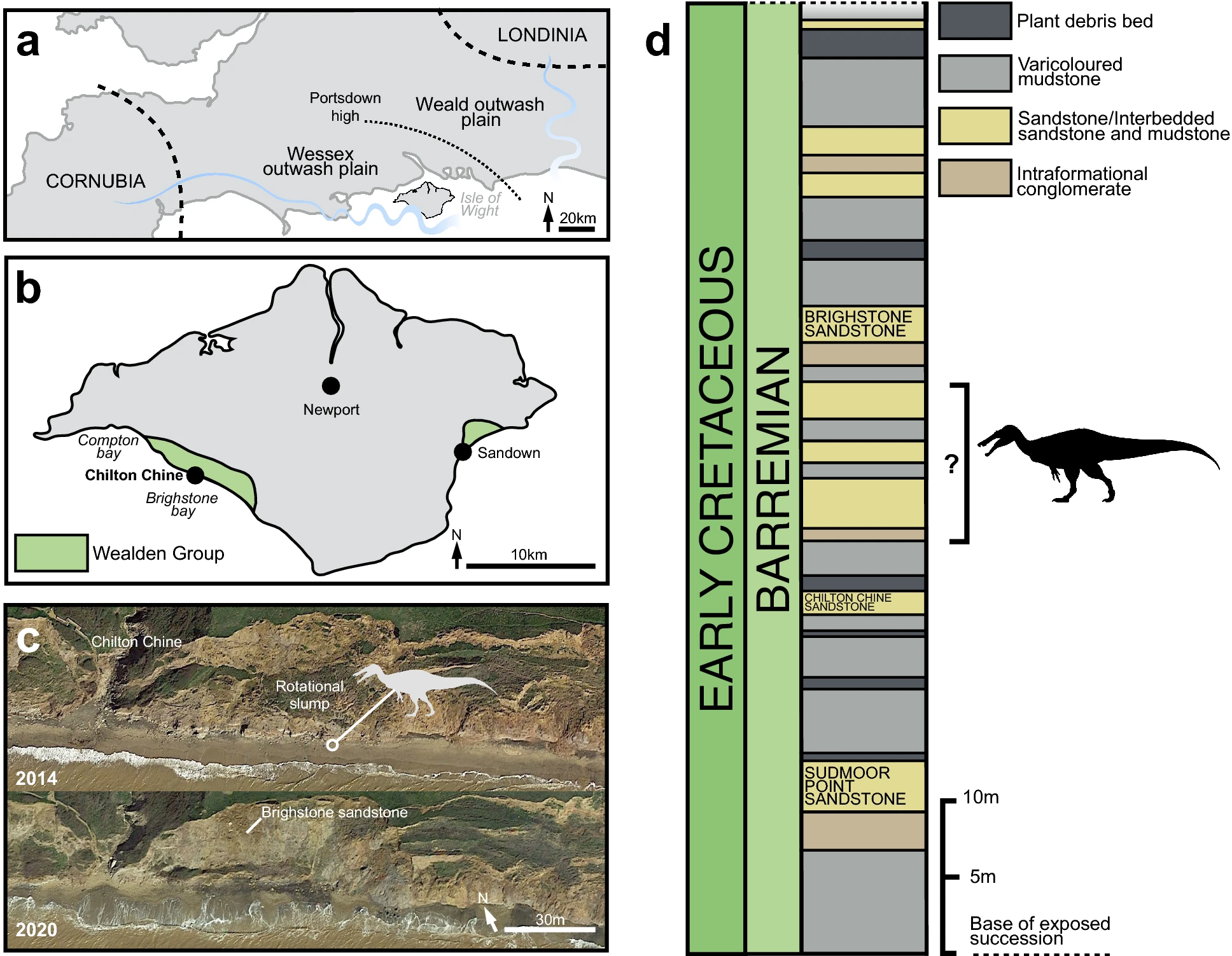
Locality information and stratigraphy of Chilton Chine

The holotype remains of Ceratosuchops inferodios consist of IWCMS 2014.95.5 (premaxillary bodies), IWCMS 2021.30 (a posterior premaxilla fragment), and IWCMS 2014.95.1-3 (a nearly complete braincase). These, in addition to a referred right postorbital (IWCMS 2014.95.4), were recovered from rocks in Chilton Chine of the Wessex Formation, part of the Isle of Wight section of the Wealden Supergroup, between 2013–2017. These specimens, alongside the holotype remains of Riparovenator milnerae, were accessioned at the Dinosaur Isle Museum in Sandown. While the remains of R. milnerae were found in geological context, those of C. inferodios were recovered from sandstone blocks found on the foreshore, and their exact stratigraphic location could not be determined.

In 2021, Ceratosuchops inferodios was named and described by a team of palaeontologists including Chris Tijani Barker, Darren Naish, David W. E. Hone, and others. The generic name comes from the Greek κέρας ("horn"), Σοῦχος ("crocodile"), and ὄψ ("face"), referring to the prominent postorbital boss seen in the holotype; the specific name comes from Latin īnfernus ("hell, underworld") and Greek ερωδιός ("heron"), referencing the presumption by the research team that its ecology resembled that of modern herons.

== Description ==
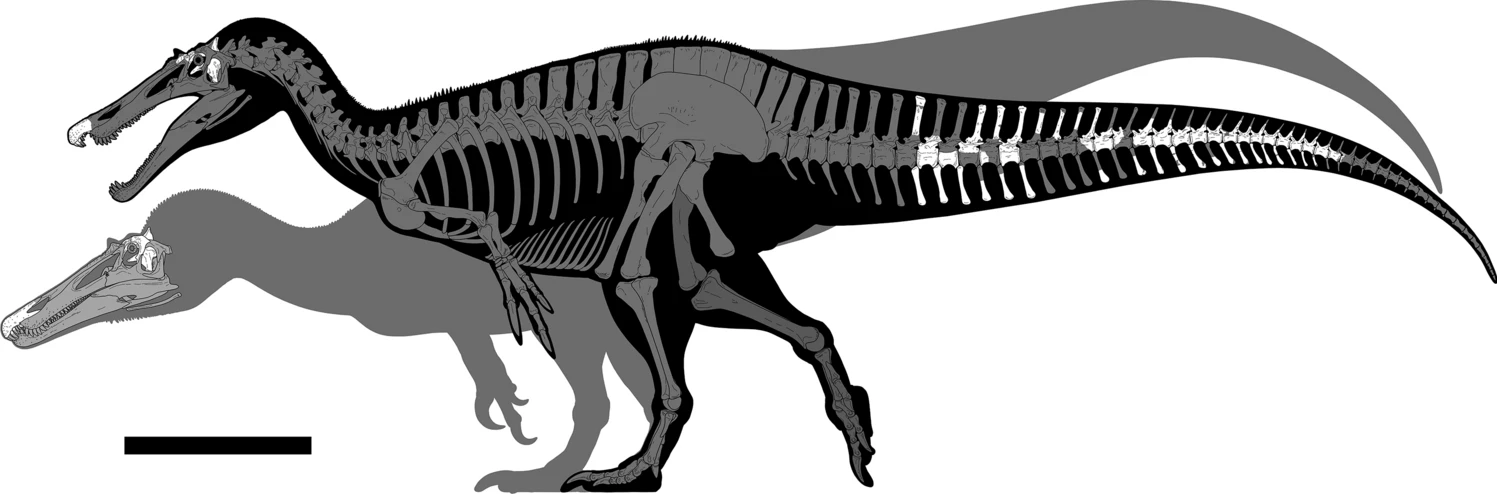
Known material of Ceratosuchops (rear) and Riparovenator (front) diagrams by Dan Folkes

Due to the fragmentary nature of the remains of this taxon and their restriction to skull material, the overall size of Ceratosuchops cannot be reliably estimated. Based on relative sizes, its body mass was likely similar to that of Baryonyx. The premaxillae of Ceratosuchops have short subnarial processes (the ventral, or bottom, part, where they contact the maxillae), similar to Baryonyx. On the other hand, the presence of narial fossae, slight depressions in front of each naris (nasal opening), more closely resembles a specimen assigned to cf. Suchomimus, to the exclusion of other baryonychines.

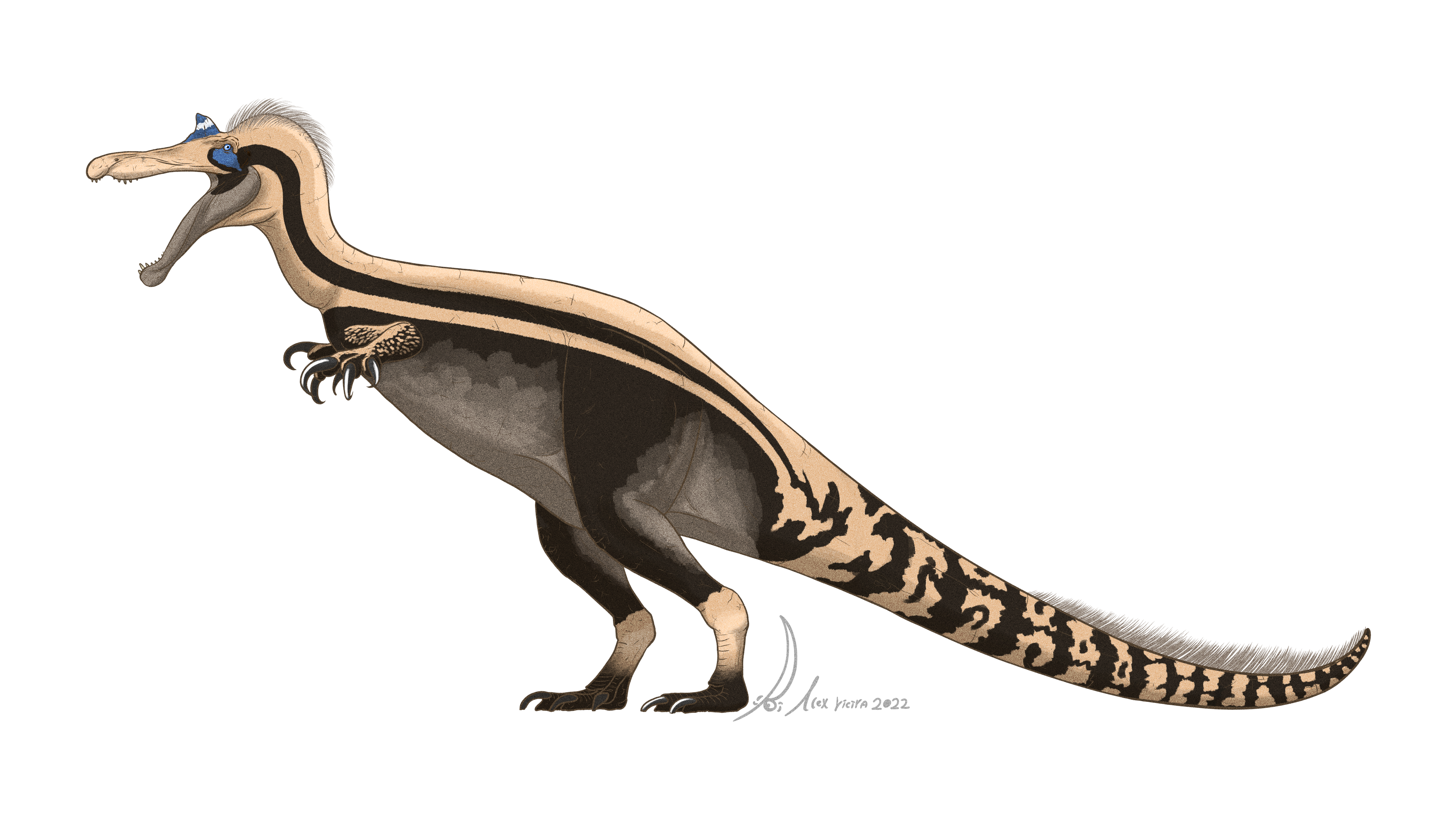
Life restoration

Two tuberosities project from the part of the premaxilla which forms the anterior (front) portion of the nares. Like Baryonyx, the premaxilla lack a sagittal crest. Like Riparovenator, the postorbital bone of C. inferodios is rugose, though in the latter, this rugosity is part of a large postorbital boss (mass of bone); its describers suggest that, like similar skull ornamentation in other taxa, these bosses may have played a role in signalling within the species, or perhaps agonistic (combative) behaviours. The subcondylar recess of the basioccipital of C. inferodios is narrow, restricted to the ventral portion of the bone, and unlike Baryonyx or Riparovenator, lacks lateral crests; the dorsal process, meanwhile, is relatively thick like that of Baryonyx.

== Classification ==
In their 2021 phylogenetic analysis, Barker and colleagues recovered Ceratosuchops within the Baryonychinae, as the sister taxon to the coeval Riparovenator. They are, in turn, part of a clade containing Suchomimus, which they named Ceratosuchopsini.

- Baryonychinae
  - - ML1190 (=Iberospinus)
    - Baryonyx
  - Ceratosuchopsini
    - Suchomimus
    - - Riparovenator
      - Ceratosuchops

In 2022, Sereno and colleagues tentatively combined Ceratosuchops and Riparovenator into a single taxonomic unit for their phylogenetic analysis. They reasoned that the different features between the two taxa could be attributed to individual variation, citing the cranial variation present in specimens of Allosaurus fragilis. Some of their supposed distinguishing features are also seen in parts of the braincase of Suchomimus, their closest relative. The results of their phylogenetic analysis (with Ceratosuchops and Riparovenator scored together) yielded similar results to those of Barker and colleagues, with the Wessex baryonychine fossils recovered as the sister taxon to Suchomimus.

- Spinosauridae
  - Camarillasaurus
  - - Baryonychinae
      - Baryonyx
      - Ceratosuchopsini
        - Ceratosuchops (+Riparovenator)
        - Suchomimus
    - Spinosaurinae
      - Ichthyovenator
      - - Vallibonavenatrix
        - - Spinosaurus
          - Irritator

== Palaeobiology ==
=== Diet ===
Like most spinosaurs, Ceratosuchops would have fed on available small to medium-sized aquatic and terrestrial prey in these areas, such as fish, small turtles, young crocodiles, baby dinosaurs, and mammals.

=== Neuroanatomy ===
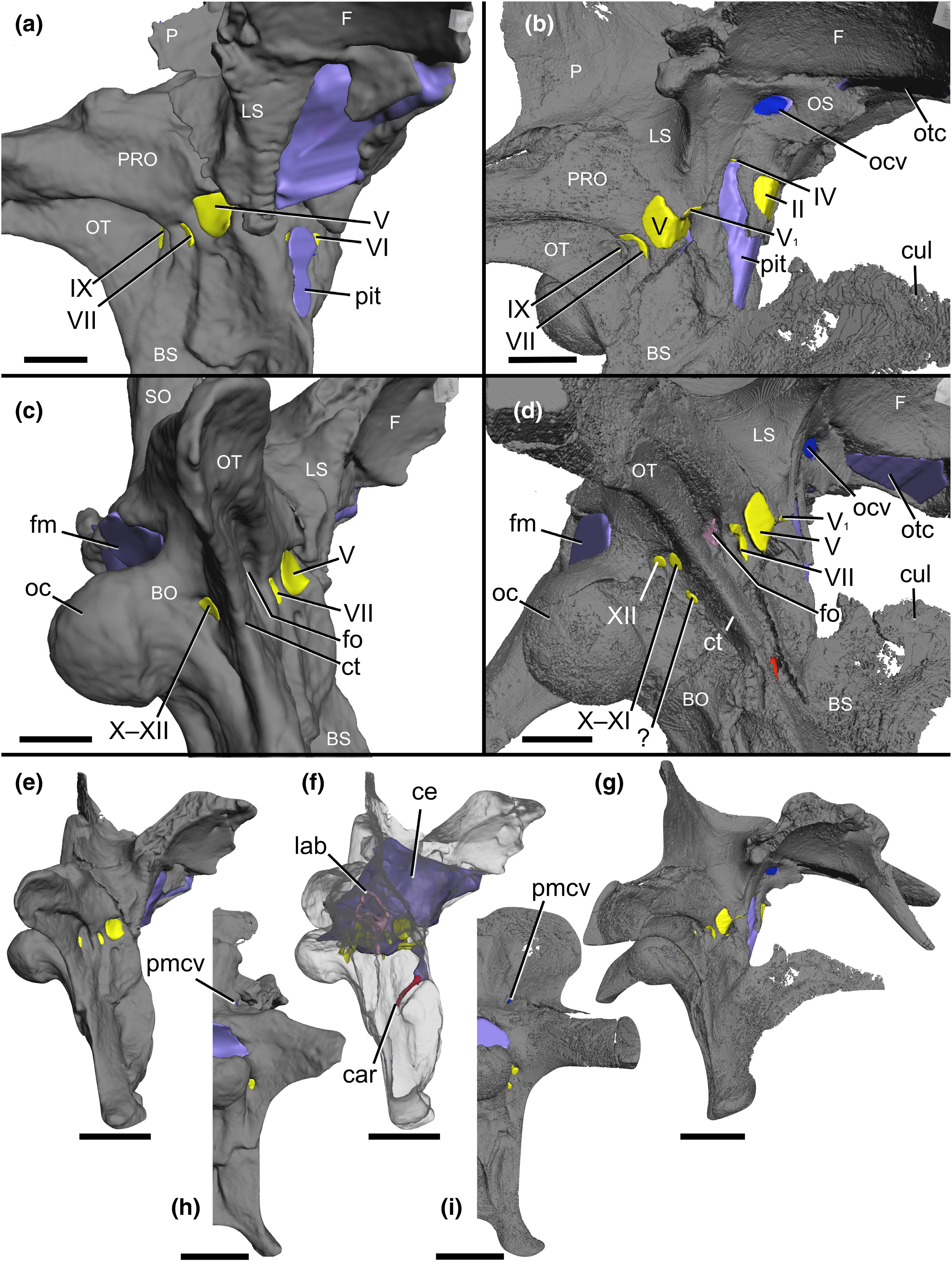
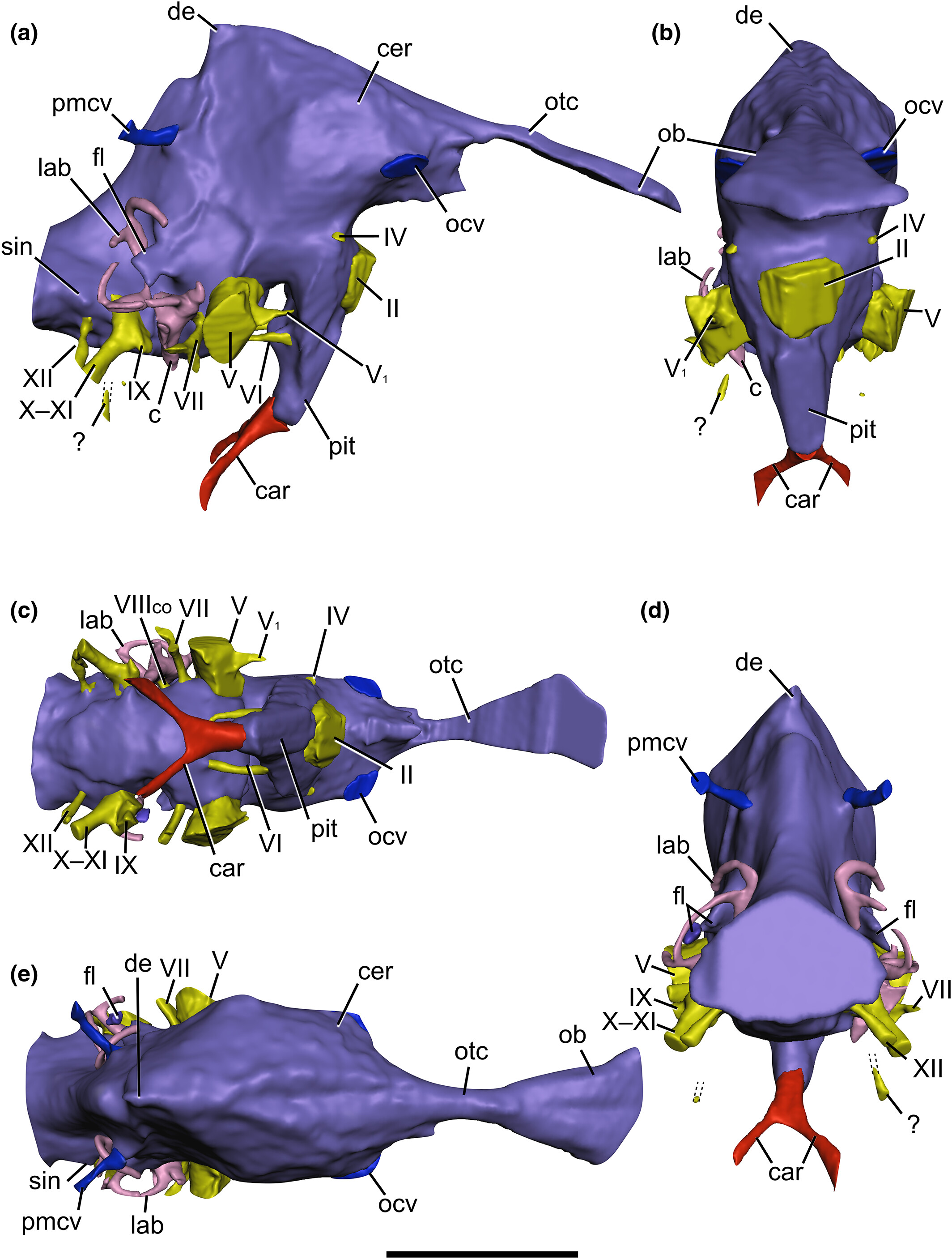
CT scan 3D models of the braincase of Ceratosuchops and Baryonyx (left), and 3D endocast of the brain of Ceratosuchops (right)

A 2023 study by Barker and colleagues based on CT scans of the braincases of Ceratosuchops and Baryonyx found that the brain anatomy of these baryonychines was similar to that of other non-maniraptoriform theropods. Their neurosensory capabilities such as hearing and olfaction (sense of smell) were unexceptional, and their gaze stabilisation less developed than those of spinosaurines, so their behavioural adaptations were probably comparable to those of other large-bodied terrestrial theropods. This suggests that their transition from terrestrial hypercarnivores to semi-aquatic "generalists" during their evolution did not require substantial modification of their brain and sensory systems. This could mean that spinosaurids were either pre-adapted for detection and capture of aquatic prey, or that their transition to semi-aquatic lifestyles only required modifications to the bones associated with the mouth. Their reptile encephalization quotient values imply that the cognitive capacity and behavioural sophistication of baryonychines did not deviate much from that of other basal theropods.

== Palaeoenvironment ==
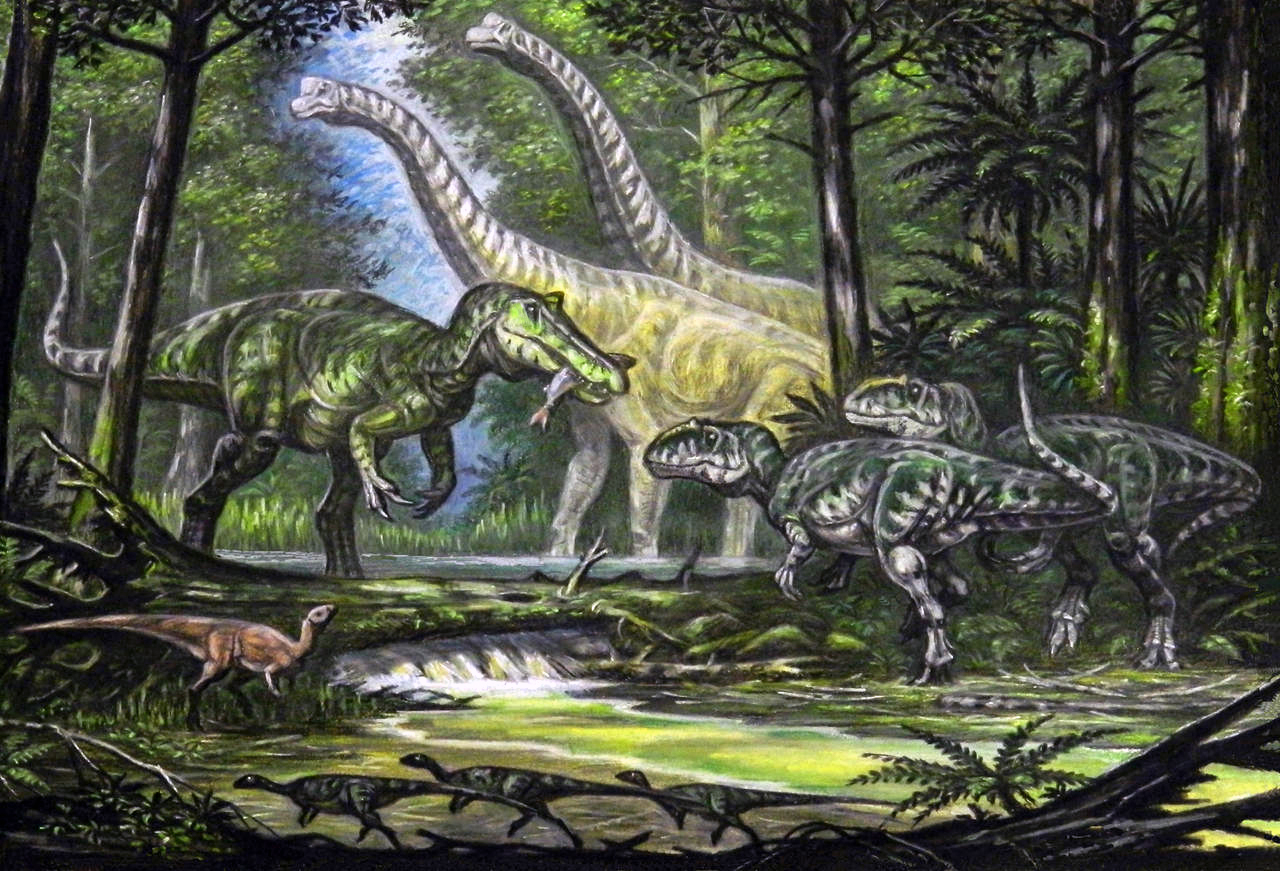
Several dinosaurs from the Isle of Wight: Eucamerotus (background), Baryonyx (left), two Neovenator (right), Valdosaurus (midground), and Hypsilophodon (foreground).

The type specimen of Ceratosuchops comes from the Wessex Formation. Sedimentological data suggests that the depositional environment of the Wessex Formation was a floodplain intersected by fluvial (river) and lacustrine (lake) deposits. Water levels likely varied throughout the year, due to there being more evaporation than precipitation, though precipitation was regardless quite high. The Wessex seems to have regularly experienced extreme storms and periodic flood events, resulting in debris flows which would have deposited dead organisms in ponds. Burned plant and insect material and fusain suggests that the environment experienced frequent wildfires, stifling for the most part the dense growth of gymnosperms. Much of the flora of the formed of low ground cover, consisting primarily of pteridophytes, with occasional stands of conifers, cycads and the tree fern Tempskya. Most vertebrate material from the Wessex Formation originates from plant debris beds, resulting from the aforementioned flooding events.

Aside from Ceratosuchops, the dinosaur fauna of the Isle of Wight includes the theropods Aristosuchus, Calamospondylus, Eotyrannus, Neovenator, Ornithodesmus, Riparovenator and Yaverlandia, the sauropods Chondrosteosaurus, Eucamerotus, and Ornithopsis, the thyreophorans Polacanthus and Vectipelta, and the ornithopods Brighstoneus, Comptonatus, Hypsilophodon, Iguanodon, Mantellisaurus, Valdosaurus and Vectidromeus. The pterosaur fauna of the Wessex Formation consists of Coloborhynchus, Caulkicephalus, Istiodactylus, Vectidraco, and Wightia; multiple unnamed pterosaur taxa, including a ctenochasmatid, are also known. Neosuchian crocodyliforms include Bernissartia, Koumpiodontosuchus and Vectisuchus. Limited evidence exists of elasmosaurids and leptocleidid plesiosaurs. The mammal fauna of the Wessex Formation includes the multituberculate Eobataar and the spalacotheriid Yaverlestes. Albanerpetontid amphibians are represented by Wesserpeton. The fish fauna of the Wessex Formation, both bony and cartilaginous, is extensive, including hybodontiform and modern sharks (Selachii), pycnodontiforms, Lepidotes and Scheenstia. Invertebrates are represented by an assortment of non-biting midges, hymenopterans (wasps) including multiple parasitoid taxa, coleopterans (beetles), the avicularoid spider Cretamygale, and the ostracod Cypridea.

=== Coexistence with other spinosaurids ===
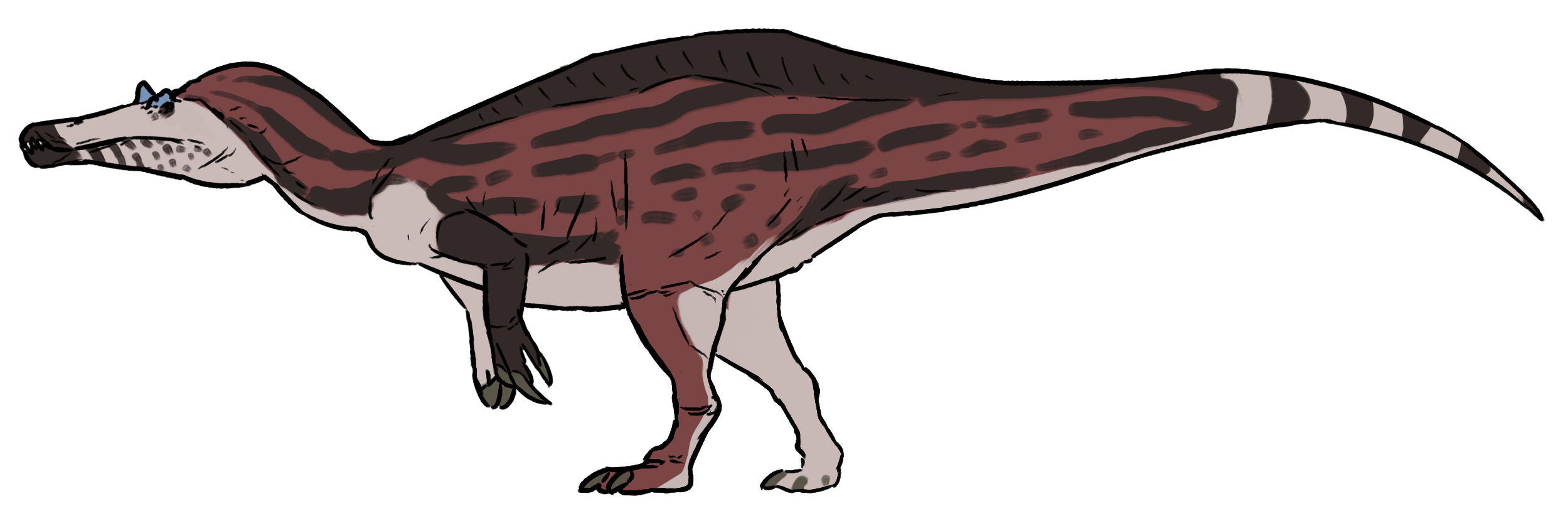
Life restoration

Barker and colleagues stated in 2021 that the identification of the two additional spinosaurids from the Wealden Supergroup, Riparovenator and Ceratosuchops, has implications for potential ecological separation within Spinosauridae if these and Baryonyx were contemporary and interacted. They cautioned that it is possible the Upper Weald Clay and Wessex Formations and the spinosaurids known from them were separated in time and distance.

It is generally thought that large predators occur with small taxonomic diversity in any area due to ecological demands, yet many Mesozoic assemblages include two or more sympatric theropods that were comparable in size and morphology, and this also appears to have been the case for spinosaurids. Barker and colleagues suggested that high diversity within Spinosauridae in a given area may have been the result of environmental circumstances benefiting their niche. While it has been generally assumed that only identifiable anatomical traits related to resource partitioning allowed for coexistence of large theropods, Barker and colleagues noted that this does not preclude that similar and closely related taxa could coexist and overlap in ecological requirements. Possible niche partitioning could be in time (seasonal or daily), in space (between habitats in the same ecosystems), or depending on conditions, and they could also have been separated by their choice of habitat within their regions (which may have ranged in climate).
