= Wessex Formation =

Early Cretaceous geological formation in England

- Stratigraphic range: Berriasian–Barremian
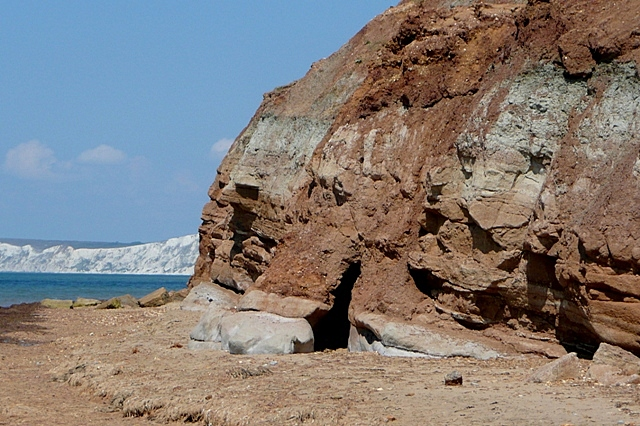
- Exposure of the Wessex Formation west of Chilton Chine
- Type: Geological formation
- Unit of: Wealden Group
- Sub-units: Coarse Quartz Grit (in Dorset)
- Underlies: Vectis Formation
- Overlies: Durlston Formation
- Thickness: up to 1000 m near Swanage

Lithology
- Primary: mudstone
- Other: sandstone, ironstone & conglomerate

Location
- Region: Southern England
- Country: United Kingdom
- Extent: Dorset, Isle of Wight, offshore Wessex Basin

Type section
- Named for: Wessex
- Named by: Daley and Stewart
- Location: Bacon Hole, Mupe Bay
- Year defined: 1979
- Exposure of the Wessex and Vectis Formations on the South Coast of the Isle of Wight, shown in turquoise.

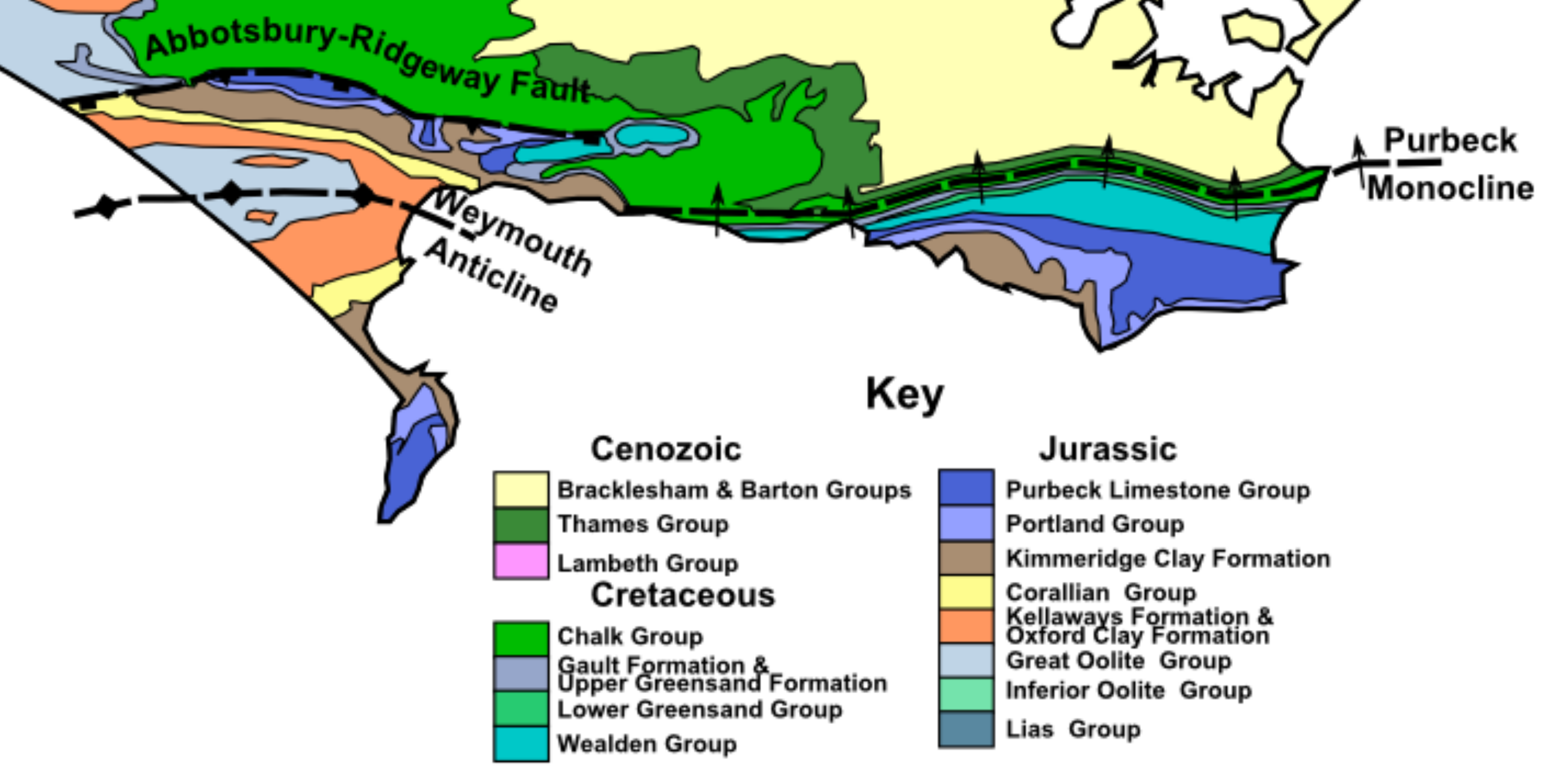
Exposures of the Wessex and Vectis Formations in southern Dorset, shown in turquoise.

The Wessex Formation is a fossil-rich English geological formation that dates from the Berriasian to Barremian stages of the Early Cretaceous. It forms part of the Wealden Group and underlies the younger Vectis Formation and overlies the Durlston Formation. The dominant lithology of this unit is mudstone with some interbedded sandstones. It is part of the strata of the Wessex Basin, exposed in both the Isle of Purbeck and the Isle of Wight. While the Purbeck sections are largely barren of vertebrate remains, the Isle of Wight sections are well known for producing the richest and most diverse fauna in Early Cretaceous Europe.

== Nomenclatural history ==
Historically, the Wessex Formation has been called alternately the "Variegated Marls and Sandstones", a name used by W. J. Arkell in his 1947 map of the Isle of Purbeck as well as the "Wealden Marls" It was given its current formal name by Daley and Stewart in 1979.

== Stratigraphy and lithology ==
=== Introduction ===
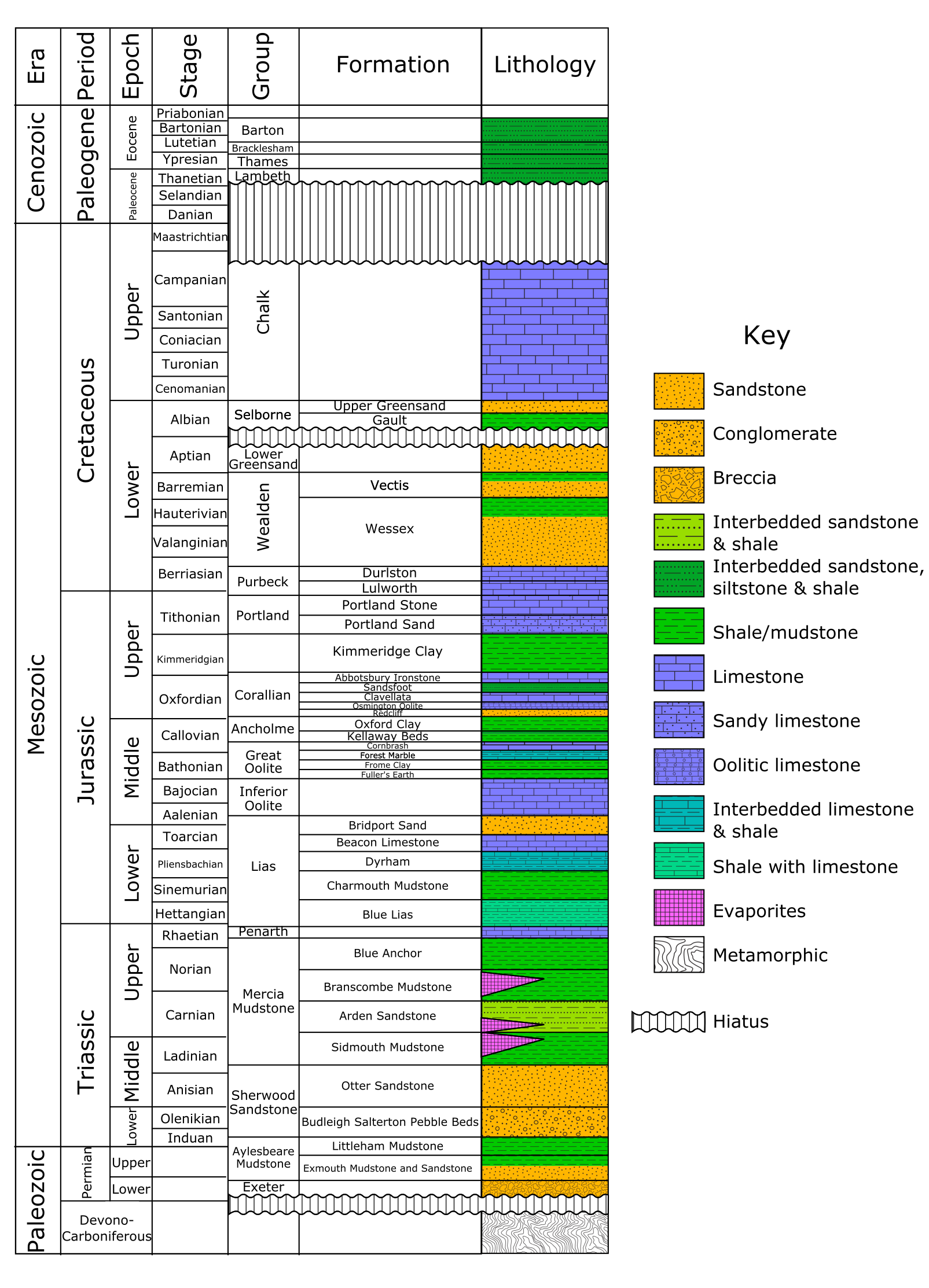
Position of the Wessex Formation within the Wessex Basin succession

The Wessex Formation forms part of the Wealden Group within the Wessex Basin, an area of subsidence since Permo-Triassic times. The basin is located along southern half of the Isle of Wight and Purbeck, extending offshore into the English Channel. The Wealden Group is also exposed significantly in the Weald Basin, which has a separate stratigraphic succession. The Wealden Group is not widely present elsewhere in Britain, as these areas were tectonic highs where little to no sediment deposition was taking place. The formation has limited exposure as it has been deeply buried beneath the subsequent Lower Greensand. Selbourne and Chalk Groups, as well as being very vulnerable to erosion. It has been exposed at the surface due to the creation of anticlinal structures as a distant effect of the formation of the Pyrenees as part of the Alpine Orogeny during the Paleogene.

The major source rocks for the sediments were from the Cornubian Massif to the west, an upland region roughly equivalent to the extent of Cornwall and Devon, with occasional large dropstones transported in tree roots being found in Wealden sediments over 100 kilometres (62 mi) from where they originated.

=== The Wessex Formation in the Isle of Purbeck ===
The exposure in of the Wessex Formation in the Isle of Purbeck is largely confined to a thin belt on the south side of the Purbeck Ridge and is best exposed at Swanage, Lulworth Cove and Worbarrow Bay. One notable persistent horizon within the Purbeck sections of the formation is the "Coarse Quartz Grit", an up to 6 metres (20 ft) thick sequence of conglomeratic ironstone, with many beds including numerous centimetre sized subangular to rounded pebbles predominantly of vein derived quartz, hence the name. This horizon is present throughout the Purbeck outcrops of the Wessex Formation. The transition to the Vectis Formation at Swanage is obscured by a landslip.

=== The Wessex Formation of the Isle of Wight ===
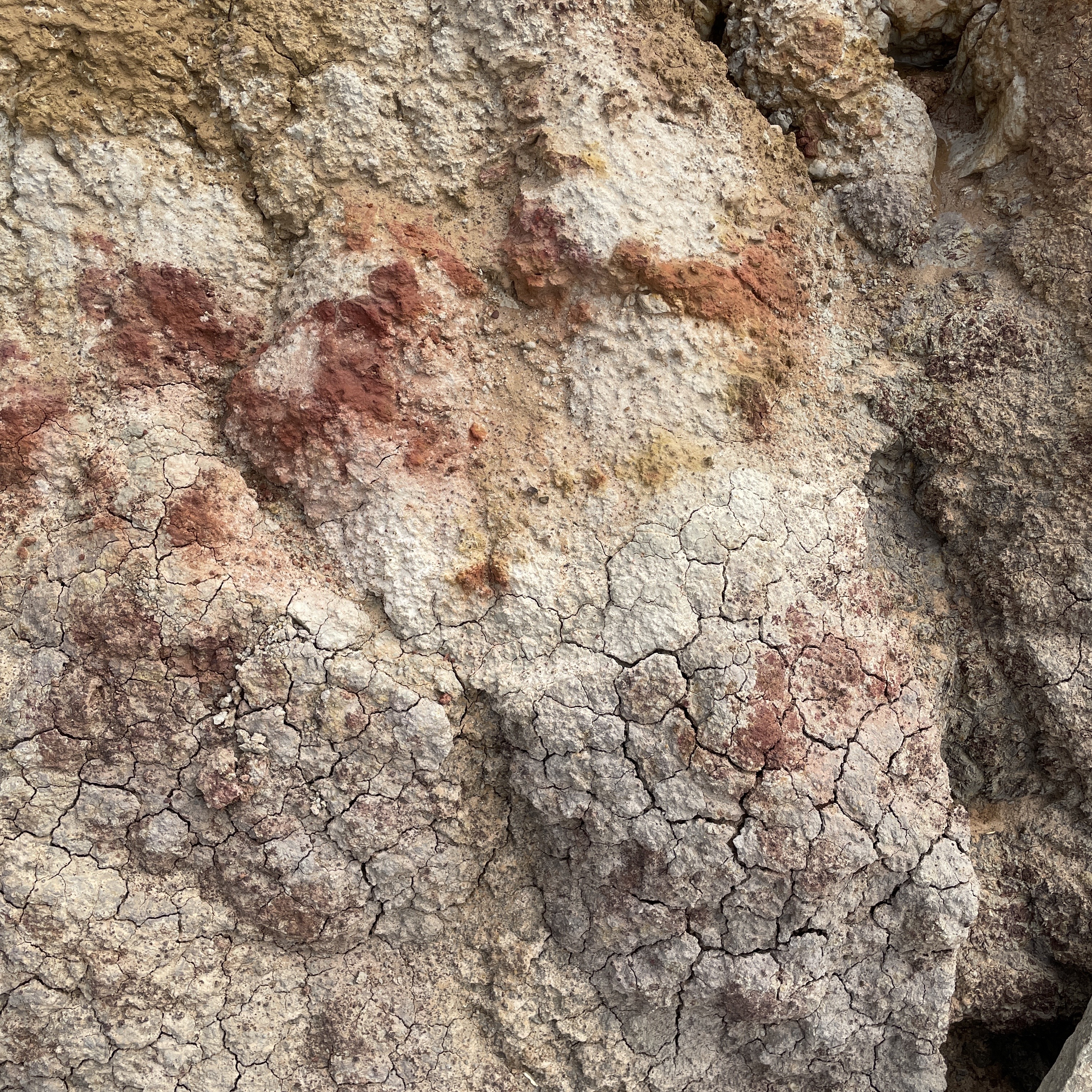
Wessex Formation mudstones

The Isle of Wight succession has two primary exposures, The major one being the several kilometre long section along the South West coastline around Brighstone Bay, and another smaller exposure on the South East coast near Yaverland. While the formation taken as a whole dates from the Berriasian to the Barremian, only the uppermost part of the formation is exposed on the Isle of Wight. With less than 200 metres (660 ft) of exposed composite stratigraphic thickness, and which dates from Hauterivian to Barremian. A radiometric date has been obtained from the lower part of the succession, estimated to be 127.3 ± 2.7 million years ago. This makes the formation coeval with upper portion of the Weald Clay in the Weald Basin. The primary lithology of the exposed portion of the formation on the Isle of Wight consists of featureless purple-red overbank mudstone, interbedded with sandstones. The environment of deposition was a floodplain within a narrow, east–west oriented valley. The climate at the time of deposition is considered to be semi-arid, based on the presence of pedogenic calcrete nodules within the mudstones. The "Pine Raft" horizon found near the base of the exposed portion of the formation includes calcitized conifer trunks up to metre in diameter and 2–3 metres (6 ft 7 in – 9 ft 10 in) long.

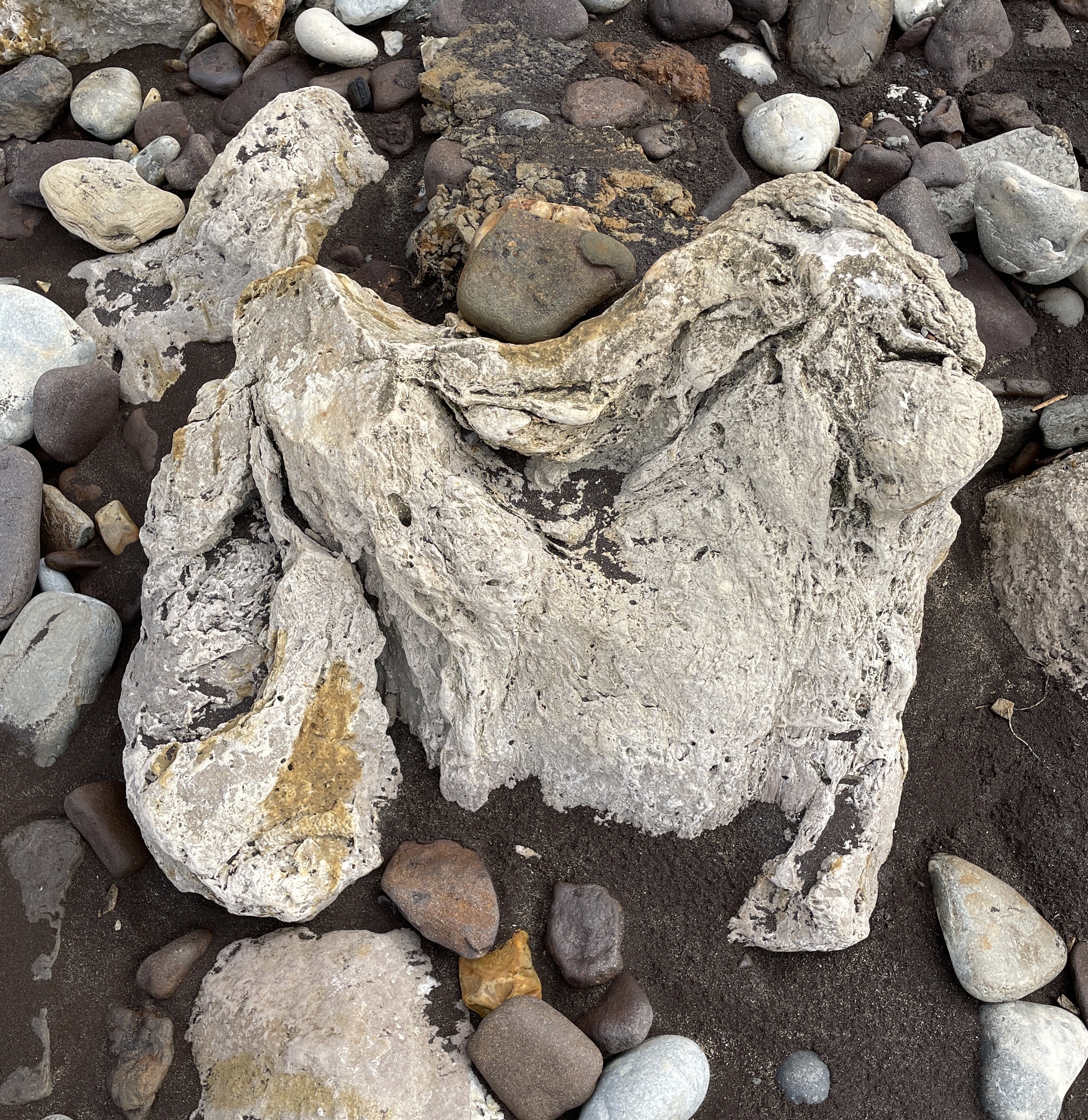
Cast of a dinosaur footprint, Wessex Formation

==== Plant debris beds ====
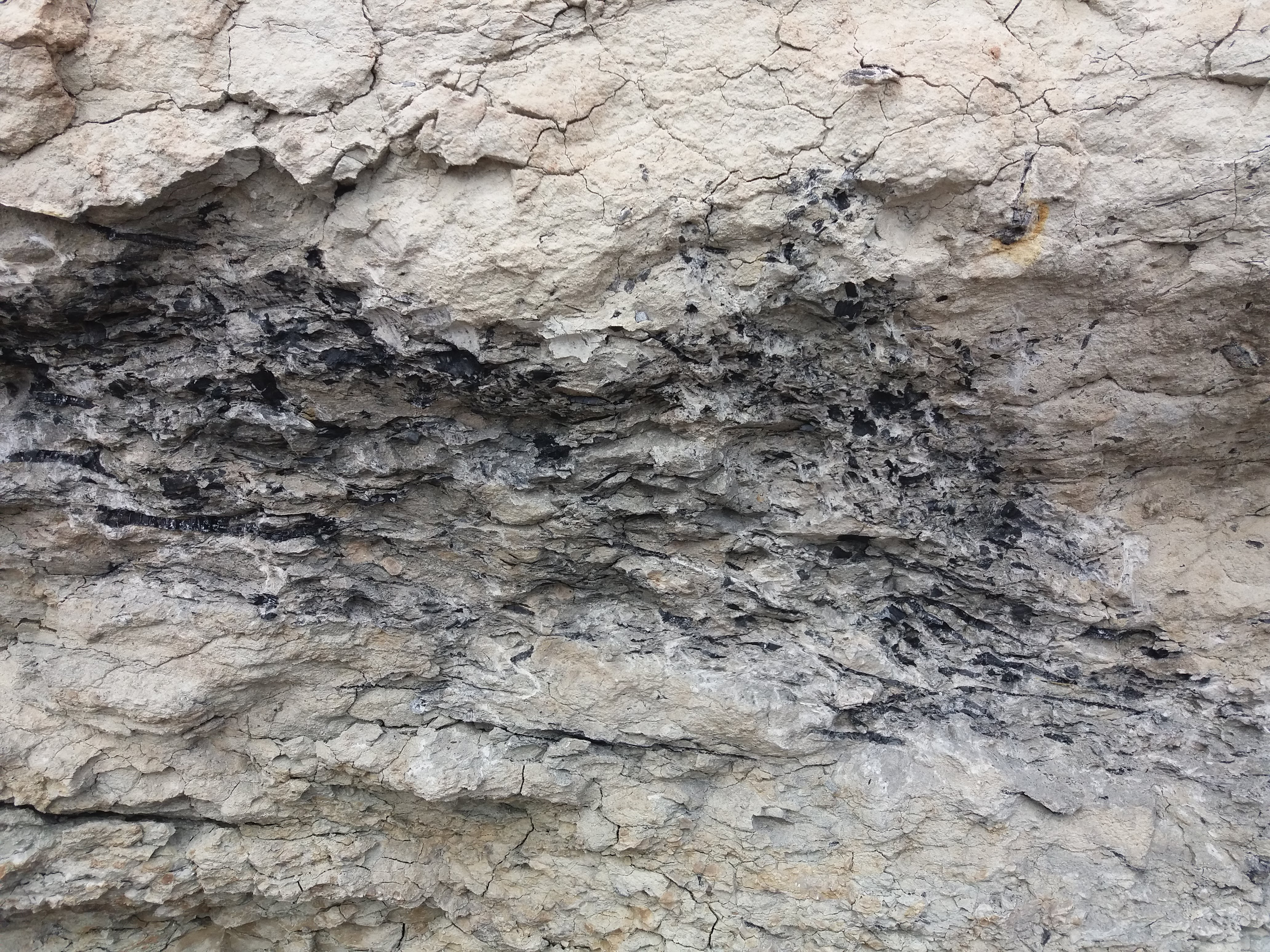
Close up of L6 plant debris bed, showing charcoalised plant matter suspended in grey mudstone

A notable feature of the formation are the so-called "plant debris beds". These consist of a basal matrix supported conglomerate, grading upwards into grey mudstone with lignitic plant debris, including large trunk fragments of the extinct conifer Pseudofrenelopsis present in the upper portion. These were formed by sheet flood deposits induced by storms that filled pre-existing topographic lows like oxbow lakes and abandoned channels in the floodplain depositional environment. The debris beds do not form a continuous horizon throughout the formation, but are laterally extensive over tens of metres. Many of the wood fragments in the debris beds are cemented together with large nodules of pyrite, suggesting depositional conditions were anoxic. Most fossils within the formation are associated with the debris beds. Vertebrate fossils are mostly disarticulated individual bones and teeth, suggesting a long subaerial exposure prior to burial, though the bones lack abrasion, suggesting that they had not been significantly transported. Partial skeletons also sometimes occur, but are uncommon. Autochthonous siderite nodules are also present, which encase some of the fossils. Plant debris beds also exist within the Swanage section, and one of these horizons has yielded microvertebrate remains.

==== "Hypsilophodon bed" ====
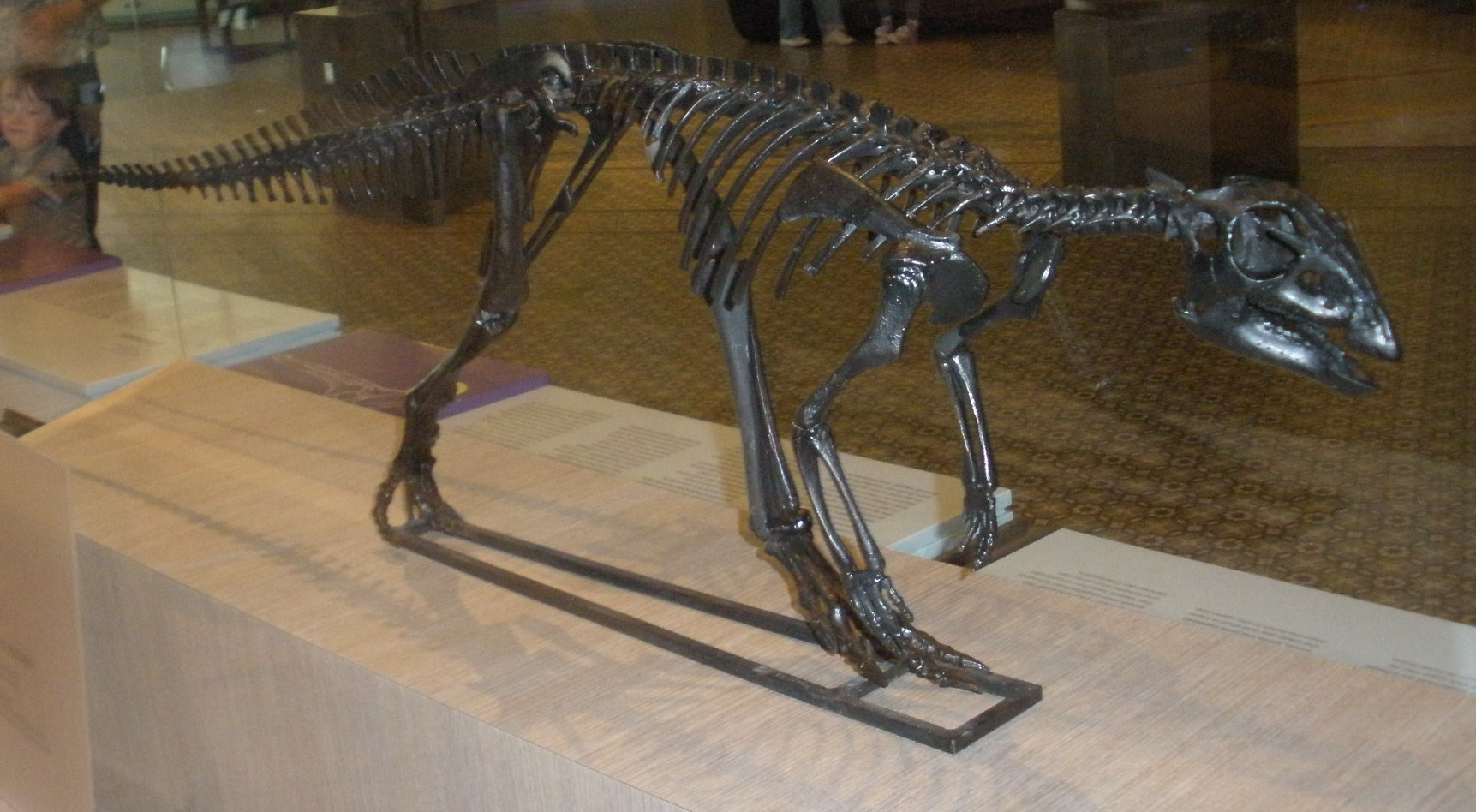
Skeleton of Hypsilophodon

While most fossils are associated with the plant debris beds, a notable exception is the "Hypsilophodon bed" present near the top of the formation, an up to 1 metre (3 ft 3 in) thick bed of silty red-green mudstone, with two separate horizons that have produced almost exclusively over a hundred complete and articulated skeletons of the dinosaur Hypsilophodon, sometimes even with preserved tail tendons. The bed is laterally extensive, being persistent for over a kilometre. A 2017 study suggested that the accumulation of skeletons were a mass mortality event caused by a crevasse splay, while a 2025 study contested this assertion, suggesting that the Hypsilophodon individuals gradually accumulated over time and had been exposed for some time prior to burial. Just above the "Hypsilophodon bed" the red mudstones of the Wessex Formation change to the transitional light coloured sandstone "White rock" and overlying laminated grey mudstones of the Vectis Formation, caused by the changing of environmental conditions from that of a floodplain to coastal lagoon conditions.

== Palaeoenvironment ==
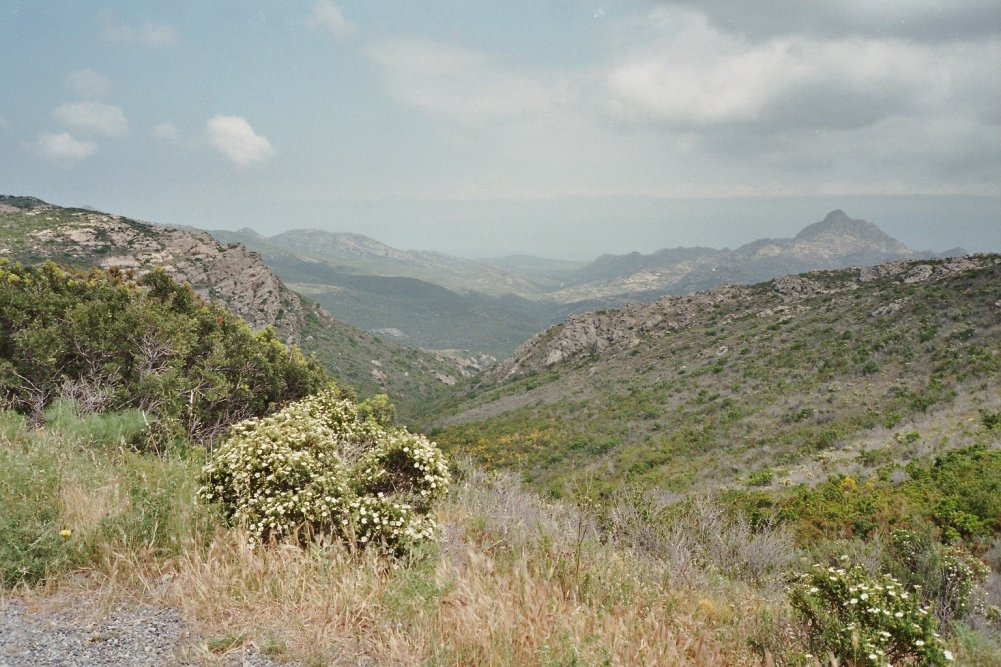
Example of modern macchia vegetation in Corsica, to which the environment of the Wessex Formation has been compared

The palaeoenvironment of the Wessex Formation is considered to have been semi-arid, and has variously been compared to chaparral or macchia Mediterranean shrubland. The dominant trees were conifers of the extinct family Cheirolepidiaceae belonging to the genera Pseudofrenelopsis and Watsoniocladus, both of which have reduced xerophytic leaves adapted to arid conditions. Tree cover is thought to have been thin, and concentrated near waterways. The ground cover is thought to have consisted of xerophytic ferns. Wildfires were common occurrences, as evidenced by preserved charred vegetation.

== Fauna ==
Stratigraphic distribution of dinosaur fossils in the Wessex Formation

The Wessex Formation likely spans several million years of deposition, and not all taxa are likely to have been contemporaneous.

=== Invertebrates ===
Invertebrates are commonly preserved in the Wessex Formation. Freshwater bivalves can be found including unionids such as Margaritifera, Nippononaia, and Unio. These bivalves help reconstruct what the freshwater paleoenvironment may have been like during the formation's deposition. Specimens of Viviparus, a genus of freshwater snail, have also been found. While compression fossils of insects are found in the overlying Vectis Formation, all insect fossils in the Wessex Formation are found as inclusions in amber. Amber can be found present as a rare component in plant debris beds in the Wessex formation both on the Isle of Wight and the Isle of Purbeck, however, the only significant concentration and where all of the inclusions have been found is a lag channel in the L6 plant debris horizon just south-east of Chilton Chine. Only four species from the amber have been formally described, Cretamygale chasei a mygalomorph spider, Dungeyella gavini Libanodiamesa simpsoni, both chironomid midges, as well as Embolemopsis maryannae, a embolemid parasitic wasp. However a table of undescribed taxa has been given, and several images of some of the undescribed taxa have been released from various sources, including multiple chironomids, and a therevid dipteran.

Color key: Taxon / Reclassified taxon / Taxon falsely reported as present / Dubious taxon or junior synonym / Ichnotaxon / Ootaxon / Morphotaxon

Notes
Uncertain or tentative taxa are in small text
~~crossed out~~ taxa are discredited.

==== Arthropods ====
Arthropods of the Wessex Formation
Genus	Species	Location	Stratigraphic Position	Abundance	Note	Images
Cypridea	C. wicheri, C. brevirostrata	Dungy Head	Base of the formation		An ostracod belonging to Cypridoidea	
Cretamygale	C. chasei	Chilton Chine	L6 plant debris bed	Single specimen	Mygalomorph spider, has been described from a specimen found in amber.	See article
Dungeyella	D. gavini	Chilton Chine	L6 plant debris bed	Multiple specimens	A tiny buchonomyiine chironomid midge	See article
Embolemopsis	E. maryannae	Chilton Chine	L6 plant debris bed	Single specimen	Embolemid parasitic wasp, genus also known from the Zaza Formation. Specimen previously described as a dryinid in a 2015 conference abstract.	
Protopangu	P. valdensis	Chilton Chine	L6 plant debris bed	Single specimen	A panguid parasitic stinging wasp	
Libanodiamesa	L. simpsoni	Chilton Chine	L6 plant debris bed	Single specimen	Prodiamesinae chironomid, genus also known from the Lebanese amber	
Chironomidae	Indeterminate	Chilton Chine	L6 plant debris bed	44% of all arthropod inclusions	Uncertain how many taxa represented, likely at least two. At least one is a tanypodian with a wingspan twice that of Dungeyella.	
Therevidae	Indeterminate	Chilton Chine	L6 plant debris bed	At least one specimen	At least one specimen figured	
Diptera	Indeterminate	Chilton Chine	L6 plant debris bed	Multiple specimens	Uncertain how many taxa represented	
Hymenoptera	Indeterminate	Chilton Chine	L6 plant debris bed	Multiple specimens	Uncertain how many taxa represented	
Blattodea	Indeterminate	Chilton Chine	L6 plant debris bed	Single specimen		
Coleoptera	Indeterminate	Chilton Chine	L6 plant debris bed	Single specimen		
Curculionoidea?	Indeterminate				Represented by a boring in a gymnospermous seed.	

=== Vertebrates ===
==== Cartilaginous fish ====
Cartilaginous fishes of the Wessex Formation
Genus	Species	Location	Stratigraphic Position	Abundance	Note	Images
Egertonodus	H. basanus				A hybodontid hybodont	
Hybodus	Indeterminate 1		Yaverland bed 38, L9		A hybodontid hybodont	
Hybodus	Indeterminate 2		Yaverland bed 38, L9		A hybodontid hybodont	
Hybodus	Indeterminate 3		Yaverland bed 38, L9		A hybodontid hybodont	
Lonchidion	L. breve		Yaverland bed 38		A lonchidiid hybodont	
Lonchidion	L. striatum		Yaverland bed 38, L9	51.43% of total chondrichthyan taxa in L9	A lonchidiid hybodont	
Lonchidion	Indeterminate 1		Yaverland bed 38, L9		A lonchidiid hybodont	
Lonchidion	Indeterminate 2		Yaverland bed 38, L9	35.86% of total chondrichthyan taxa in Yaverland bed 38	A lonchidiid hybodont	
Lonchidion	Indeterminate 3		Yaverland bed 38, L9		A lonchidiid hybodont	
Hylaeobatis	H. problematica				A lonchidiid hybodont	
Palaeoscyllium	Indeterminate				A catshark	
Parvodus	P. heterodon				A lonchidiid hybodont	
Protospinax	Indeterminate				A squalomorph shark	
Vectiselachos	V. ornatus				A lonchidiid hybodont	

==== Ray-finned fish ====
Ray-finned fishes of the Wessex Formation
Genus	Species	Location	Stratigraphic Position	Abundance	Notes	Images
Belonostomus	Indeterminate				An aspidorhynchiform known from isolated teeth	Full skeleton of the related Belonostomus tenuirostris
Caturus	Indeterminate				A caturid halecomorph	
Coelodus	Indeterminate				A pycnodontid	
Coccolepis	Indeterminate				A coccolepidid	
Lepidotes	Indeterminate					
Ocloedus	Indeterminate				A pycnodontid	
Pachythrissops	Indeterminate					
Pycnodontiformes	Indeterminate					
Scheenstia	Indeterminate				A lepidotid ginglymodian	

==== Amphibians ====
Amphibians of the Wessex Formation
Genus	Species	Location	Stratigraphic Position	Abundance	Notes	Images
Wesserpeton	W.evansae		L2 and Yaverland 38		An albanerpetontid	
Anura	Indeterminate	Multiple	1: Yaverland 38 2: L2 and Yaverland 38 3: L2 and Yaverland 38 4: Yaverland 38 5: Yaverland 38	At least 5 distinct taxa distinguished by characters in their ilium		
Urodela	Indeterminate	Multiple	1: L2, L14 and Yaverland 33 and 38 2: L9 and Yaverland 38 3: unnamed bed in Compton bay and Yaverland 38	At least 3 distinct taxa distinguished by their atlas vertebrae		

==== Mammals ====
Mammals of the Wessex Formation
Genus	Species	Location	Stratigraphic Position	Material	Notes	Images
Eobaatar	E. clemensi	Multiple debris beds	L9, Yaverland bed 38 and CL3	Teeth	An eobaatarid multituberculate	
?Gobiconodon	Indeterminate	Yaverland	Yaverland bed 38	A lower right premolariform	A gobiconodontid	
Loxaulax	?L. valdensis			Teeth	An eobaatarid multituberculate	
Yaverlestes	Y. gassoni	Multiple debris beds	Mandible from Yaverland bed 38, isolated teeth from L2, L9 and L14	Mandible Fragment and isolated teeth	A spalacotheriid	
Dryolestidae	Indeterminate	Multiple debris beds	Yaverland bed 38 and L9	A lower right molar (NHMUK.M45558) C, an upper left molar (NHMUK.M45564)., a tentatively referred lower left or upper right premolar (NHMUK.M45484)		
Eutriconodonta	Indeterminate	Yaverland	Yaverland bed 38	Lower left molariform		
Zatheria	Indeterminate			Premolars	Eutheria?	

==== Reptiles ====
===== Plesiosaurs =====
Plesiosaurs of the Wessex Formation
Genus	Species	Location	Stratigraphic Position	Abundance	Notes	Images
Elasmosauridae	Indeterminate	Compton Bay		Vertebra		
Plesiosauroidea	Indeterminate	Tie pits, atherfield		Propodial	Leptocleididae?	

===== Squamates =====
Squamates of the Wessex Formation
Genus	Species	Location	Stratigraphic Position	Abundance	Notes	Images
Meyasaurus	Indeterminate	Yaverland	Yaverland bed 38	Teeth and a partial lower jaw	Genus also known from Spain	
Anguimorpha	indeterminate	Multiple plant debris beds	1st taxon L14 and L2, 2nd L2 and Yaverland bed 38, 3rd Yaverland bed 38	At least 3 distinct taxa represented by isolated teeth, maxilla and lower jaw fragments, alongside a possible fourth taxon.		
Scincomorpha	indeterminate	Multiple plant debris beds	1: L14 and Yaverland 38 2: Yaverland 38, 3: L2 and Yaverland 38 4,5: Yaverland bed 38 6:L2, L14 and Yaverland 38 7,8,9: Yaverland 38 10: L2, L14 and Yaverland 38	At least 10 distinct taxa represented by isolated teeth, maxilla and lower jaw fragments, some of which are paramacellodids based on the common occurrence of osteoderms typical of this clade.		

===== Turtles =====
Turtles of the Wessex Formation
Genus	Species	Location	Stratigraphic Position	Material	Notes	Images
Helochelydra	H. nopcsai			Shell and skull material	A helochelydrid	
Brodiechelys	B. brodiei			Shell fragments	A xinjiangchelyid, previously known by the synonyms Plesiochelys brodiei Lydekker, 1889; Plesiochelys valdensis Lydekker, 1889 and Plesiochelys vectensis Hooley, 1900	
Eodortoka	E. cf. morellana			Partial shell with associated vertebrae and limb bones	A dortokid panpleurodiran.	

===== Crocodylomorphs =====
Crocodylomorphs of the Wessex Formation
Genus	Species	Location	Stratigraphic Position	Abundance	Notes	Images
Anteophthalmosuchus	A. hooleyi		Disputed, either uppermost Wessex or lowermost Vectis		A goniopholidid	
Anteophthalmosuchus	A. epikrator	Hanover Point		Mostly complete skull and partial dentaries and associated postcranial material	A goniopholidid	
Bernissartia	Indeterminate			40 Isolated teeth	A bernissartiid	
Hulkepholis	H. willetti			A well-preserved, nearly complete skull	A goniopholidid	
Koumpiodontosuchus	K. aprosdokiti				A bernissartiid	
Theriosuchus	Indeterminate			Teeth	An atoposaurid	
Vectisuchus	V. leptognathus	Barnes High	Just below the base of the Vectis formation	"Partial semi-articulated skeleton"	A goniopholidid	

===== Pterosaurs =====
Pterosaurs of the Wessex Formation
Genus	Species	Location	Stratigraphic Position	Material	Notes	Images
Caulkicephalus	C. trimicrodon			Skull and rostrum fragments	An ornithocheirid	Caulkicephalus Istiodactylus
Ctenochasmatidae	Indeterminate			Tooth, potentially a gnathosaurine		Caulkicephalus Istiodactylus
Istiodactylus	I. latidens			Partial skeleton and skull, and referred mandible fragment	An istiodactylid	Caulkicephalus Istiodactylus
Istiodactylidae	Indeterminate		Found throughout the sub basin	Teeth	Two other species, distinct from I.latidens	Caulkicephalus Istiodactylus
Neoazhdarchia	Indeterminate			Humerus		Caulkicephalus Istiodactylus
Ornithocheiridae	Indeterminate			"partial distal left metacarpal IV"	Estimated wingspan of 5.6 metres	Caulkicephalus Istiodactylus
Tylodorhynchus	T. rodriguesae			Rostrum fragment	An ornithocheirid originally assigned to Uktenadactylus, distinct from Coloborhynchus	Caulkicephalus Istiodactylus
Wightia	W. declivirotris			Rostrum fragment	A tapejarid	Caulkicephalus Istiodactylus

===== Ornithischians =====
Ornithischians reported from the Wessex Formation
Genus	Species	Synonyms	Stratigraphic Position	Material	Notes	Images
Brighstoneus	B. simmondsi		L9	Partial skeleton	A hadrosauriform iguanodontian	
Comptonatus	C. chasei		Compton Bay	Partial skeleton	A hadrosauriform iguanodontian	
Hypsilophodon	H. foxii		Hypsilophodon bed	Many partial skeletons	A hypsolophodontid	
Heterodontosauridae?	Indeterminate		Yaverland bed 38	Teeth	Resemble the cheek teeth of the heterodontosaurid Tianyulong.	
Iguanodon	I. bernissartensis				A hadrosauriform iguanodontian. Specimens classified as Iguanodon seelyi are referable to this species. Species presence needs reassessment as the species has been used as a wastebasket taxon for relatively robust iguanodontian materia.	
Istiorachis	I. macarthurae		'Black Band' (L11)	Partial postcranial skeleton	A styracosternan iguanodontian	
Mantellisaurus	M. atherfieldensis	Dollodon bampingi, Proplanicoxa?			A hadrosauriform iguanodontian	
Polacanthus	P. foxii	Polacanthoides ponderosus?		Dorsal vertebrae, dorsosacral vertebrae, sacral vertebrae, caudosacral vertebra, caudal vertebrae, dorsal ribs, ilia, pubes, ischia, femora, tibia, distal end of fibula, astragalus, metatarsals, ungual phalanx, sacral shield and osteoderms.	An ankylosaur	
Paludohadros	P. proudlovii		Unknown	Surangular bone (NHMUK PV R 105a)	A hadrosauroid iguanodontian	
Valdosaurus	V. canaliculatus		Recovered from various parts of the formation	Multiple partial skeletons	A dryosaurid iguanodontian	
Vectidromeus	V. insularis		Lower part of the formation	Associated elements of the dorsal vertebrae, pelvis, hindlimbs, and tail, from a juvenile specimen	A hypsilophodontid	
Vectipelta	V. barretti		L5	Partial skeleton	An ankylosaur. Referred to as the "Spearpoint ankylosaur" prior to its original description. Only distantly related to Polacanthus.	

===== Sauropods =====
Sauropods reported from the Wessex Formation
Genus	Species	Location	Stratigraphic Position	Material	Notes	Images
Chondrosteosaurus	C. gigas			"Several cervical vertebrae."	A eusauropod	
Eucamerotus	E. foxi			"Dorsal vertebra."	A macronarian.	
Iuticosaurus	I. valdensis			"Several caudal vertebrae."		
Oplosaurus	O. armatus			"Tooth."		
Ornithopsis	O. eucamerotus			"Ischia and pubis.", regarded as an "undiagnostic titanosauriform of uncertain affinities."		
Ornithopsis	O. hulkei			One dorsal vertebra.		
Undescribed Sauropod (Barnes High sauropod)	Indeterminate			"Partial postcranial skeleton, including presacral vertebrae, anterior caudal vertebrae, girdle and limb elements"	Currently in private collection and unavailable to researchers. Known informally as "the Barnes High sauropod". Possibly the same as Eucamerotus	
"Angloposeidon" (informal)	Indeterminate		L1	One cervical vertebra and possible associated centrum	Represents a large animal 20 metres or greater in length. Known informally as "Angloposeidon". Perhaps a somphospondylan?	
Rebbachisauridae	Indeterminate		Scapula found approximately around L11	Scapula, radius and ulna, several cervical sacral and caudal vertebrae and isolated teeth from multiple individuals	Taxon has close affinities with Demandasaurus and Nigersaurus	
Titanosauria	Indeterminate			Two isolated large middle caudal vertebra, one isolated large cervical vertebra, BMNH R5333, two articulated caudal vertebrae with an articulated fragment of a third		

===== Theropods =====
Theropods reported from the Wessex Formation
Genus	Species	Location	Stratigraphic Position	Material	Notes	Images
Avialae	Indeterminate			Isolated teeth	Possibly an enantiornithean and a hesperornithid present	
Aristosuchus	A. pusillus			"Sacrum and pubis."	A compsognathid	
Calamosaurus	C. foxi			"Vertebrae."	A compsognathid	
Calamospondylus	C. oweni			"Vertebrae."	A possible oviraptorosaur	
Ceratosuchops	C. inferodios			Partial skull material	A spinosaurid, formerly considered remains of Baryonyx.	
Eotyrannus	E. lengi	Chilton Chine		"Partial skull and skeleton."	A tyrannosauroid	
Invictibellatrix	I. amberina	Sudmoor Point		Single braincase	A megaraptoran	
Neovenator	N. salerii	Chilton		Cranial and postcranial remains of at least four individuals.	A carcharodontosaurian	
Ornithodesmus	O. cluniculus				A species of dromaeosaurid, once misidentified as a pterosaur	
Richardoestesia?	Indeterminate			Teeth	Dubious, uncertain referral on the genus level	
Riparovenator	R. milnerae			Partial skull and referred caudal material	A spinosaurid, formerly considered remains of Baryonyx.	
Tetanurae	Indeterminate	Chilton Chine		Partial pubis and femur	Distinct from Neovenator and Baryonyx. Currently in private collection.	
Thecocoelurus	T. daviesi			"Cervical vertebrae."	A theropod of uncertain classification, possibly an ornithomimosaur (this assignment has been questioned by both Mortimer and Naish).	
Undescribed coelurosaur	Indeterminate			Partial associated skeleton	Apparently small. In private collection and undescribed. Referred to as "That Which Cannot Be Named" by Darren Naish Has been suggested to be a tyrannosauroid.	
Coelurosauria (Calamospondylus?)	Indeterminate (or possibly C. oweni)			Tibia	Previously referred to Hypsilophodon, Aristosuchus, Calamosaurus, Ornithomimosauria indet. and Coelurosauria indet.	
Velociraptorinae	Indeterminate			Isolated teeth	May belong to a proceratosaurid, or alternatively they may belong to Vectiraptor.	
Vectiraptor	V. greeni			Dorsal vertebrae and sacral vertebrae	A large bodied eudromaeosaur	
Yaverlandia	Y. bitholus	Yaverland		Two partial skull roofs with a distinctive domed morphology	A possible dinosaur of uncertain classification, originally identified as a pachycephalosaur ornithischian and later a maniraptoran theropod. Affinities with crocodyliforms, rather than dinosaurs, have also been proposed.	

== Flora ==
=== Spermatophytes ===
Spermatophytes reported from the Wessex Formation
Family	Genus	Species	Stratigraphic Position	Material	Notes	Images
Araucariaceae	Agathoxylon?	Indeterminate		Wood	Reported as "Dadoxylon" Considered a dubious referral	
Araucariaceae	Brachyphyllum	B. obesum		Leaves		
Cheirolepidiaceae	Pseudofrenelopsis	P. parceramosa		Leaves and abundant, and occasional segments of the trunk		
Cheirolepidiaceae	Watsoniocladus	W. valdensis		Leaves		
Cupressaceae	Sphenolepis			Leaves	"taxodiaceous"	
Pinaceae	Pityites	P. solmsii				

=== Pteridophytes ===
Pteridophytes reported from the Wessex Formation
Genus	Species	Location	Stratigraphic Position	Material	Notes	Images
Polypodiopsida	Indeterminate					
Tempskya	Indeterminate				May actually originate from the underlying Purbeck Group.	
Weichselia	W. reticulata			Multiple specimens		

== See also ==
- List of fossil sites
- List of stratigraphic units with dinosaur body fossils
- Dinosaurs of the Isle of Wight
