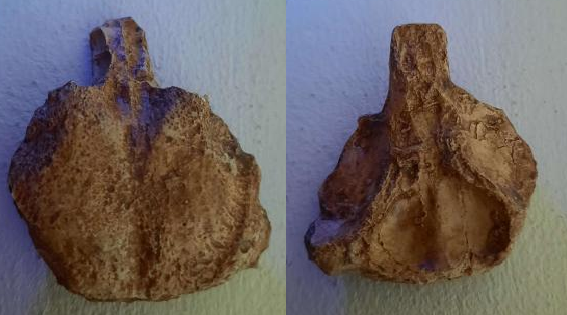
- Replica of the holotype (MIWG 1530) seen from above and below

Scientific classification
- Kingdom: Animalia
- Phylum: Chordata
- Class: Reptilia
- Clade: Archosauria
- Clade: incertae sedis
- Genus: †Yaverlandia; Galton, 1971
- Species: †Y. bitholus

Binomial name
- †Yaverlandia bitholus Galton, 1971

= Yaverlandia =

Yaverlandia Temporal range: Early Cretaceous, Hauterivian–Barremian

Extinct genus of reptile

Yaverlandia (meaning "of Yaverland Point/Yaverland Battery") is an extinct genus of possible dinosaur known from two partial fossil skulls found in Lower Cretaceous strata of the Wessex Formation (Upper Silty Bed) in the Isle of Wight, England. When the first known specimen, MIWG 1530, was first described in 1930 by D. M. S. Watson, similarities were noted with the ornithopod genus Vectisaurus (now Mantellisaurus) and the theropod genus Troodon. In 1936, it was ultimately assigned to the former. It was recognised as a distinct genus in 1971 by Peter Galton, who re-examined the remains. Galton described a single species, Yaverlandia bitholus, in the genus. He believed that it was the oldest member of the family Pachycephalosauridae. Subsequent research by Darren Naish in 2008 instead suggested affinities with maniraptoran theropods. IWCMS. 2012.585, a second specimen described in 2026 by Naish and Steven C. Sweetman, is very similar to the first specimen. These researchers determined that the identity of Yaverlandia remains enigmatic; while dinosaur affinities remain possible, some anatomical features are comparable to non-dinosaurian reptiles such as crocodyliforms.

== History ==
The holotype of Yaverlandia bitholus, MIWG 1530, consists of two frontal bones, part of the right postorbital, and part of the left orbitosphenoid. It was discovered in 1923 by F. M. G. Abell in the Wealden Marls north of the seawall below Yaverland Battery of Sandown, on the Isle of Wight. It originated from strata belonging to the Wealden Group, presumably the Wessex Formation, which on the Isle of Wight dates to the Hauterivian and Barremian ages. The specimen was first mentioned in the literature by D. M. S. Watson in an untitled article in the Proceedings of the Isle of Wight Natural History Society. Watson noted that it bore similarities to Vectisaurus, then very poorly understood, though also noted similarities with the North American genus Troodon. Six years later, W. E. Swinton assigned MIWG 1530 to Vectisaurus.

=== Naming ===
In 1971, Peter Galton re-examined the specimen, creating a cast for examination. He concluded that MIWG 1530 did not belong to the same taxon as the Vectisaurus holotype, which he later assigned to the family Iguanodontidae (and which is now a synonym of Mantellisaurus), but rather to a pachycephalosaurid. In light of its distinctiveness, Galton gave it the binomial name of Yaverlandia bitholus. The genus name, Yaverlandia, refers to Yaverland, while the species name, bitholus, derives from the Latin bi ("two") and tholus ("dome"), in reference to Galton's belief that Y. bitholus bore two small domes, rather than a flat skull or a single large dome as in later pachycephalosaurids.

=== Reinterpretations and second specimen ===
The status of Yaverlandia has been questioned since its naming, with Darren Naish and David Martill noting in 2002 that the holotype is fragmentary enough that it borders on being a nomen dubium. Naish later suggested that Yaverlandia was not a pachycephalosaurid, as initially suggested, but rather may have been a theropod, and more specifically a maniraptoran. Traits indicating a position within Theropoda include a cerebral concavity with two distinct lobes, a narrow olfactory tract with small olfactory bulbs, and concave ventral (bottom) margins to the orbits (eye sockets). Furthermore, a computerised tomography (CT) scan of the specimen found cavities within the bones similar to those found in maniraptorans. In 2011, Naish suggested that it was a troodontid, and prepared a redescription of the genus, but this has yet to be published.

In 2012, a second specimen referable to Yaverlandia was discovered by a student on a school fossil-hunting trip in Yaverland on the Isle of Wight. The specimen, IWCMS. 2012.585, is nearly the same size as the holotype and consists of nearly identical material. It exhibits greater abrasion as a result of exposure to different taphonomic processes. Naish and Steven C. Sweetman described this specimen in 2026. They noted that no anatomical features could be recognized that definitively supported a placement of Yaverlandia with any specific clade, including maniraptoran theropods and pachycephalosaurs. Possible internal vacuities in the frontal bones may contradict a pachycephalosaur identity, since the frontals (and other skull roof bones) are generally solid in these species. Such vacuities may be more consistent with a coelurosaur theropod identity. However, the authors further noted that the morphology of the cerebral cavity and the texture and form of the frontals are also seen in non-dinosaurian reptiles, such as crocodyliforms. Naish & Sweetman concluded that the phylogenetic affinities of Yaverlandia remained unclear. They further emphasized its rarity, either due to it being a truly uncommon animal in the Wealden fauna or due to some unknown taphonomic bias.

== Description ==
Comparisons with the skulls of Hypsilophodon and Stegoceras led Peter Galton to note that, despite being fused into a single element, both frontal bones were preserved in the holotype of Yaverlandia. Galton diagnosed Yaverlandia based on the presence of two small domes (one per frontal), a dorsal (upper) surface covered in small pits, a frontal which contributed to the edge of the orbit (eye socket) and was not excluded from it by the prefrontal bone, and a supratemporal fenestra which was not constricted by the postorbital bone, nor reduced as in late pachycephalosaurid genera. The kind of pitting observed on the dorsal surfaces of each frontal is not found in any known pachycephalosaurid taxon, although something loosely similar is known in Homalocephale. The depressions formed by each cerebral hemisphere were concave, differing from those of Pachycephalosaurus and Stegoceras in that they were not enclosed in bone ventrally (on their bottom side); the presence of two distinct lobes is part of the reason Yaverlandia had been tentatively assigned to Maniraptora.

== Palaeoecology ==
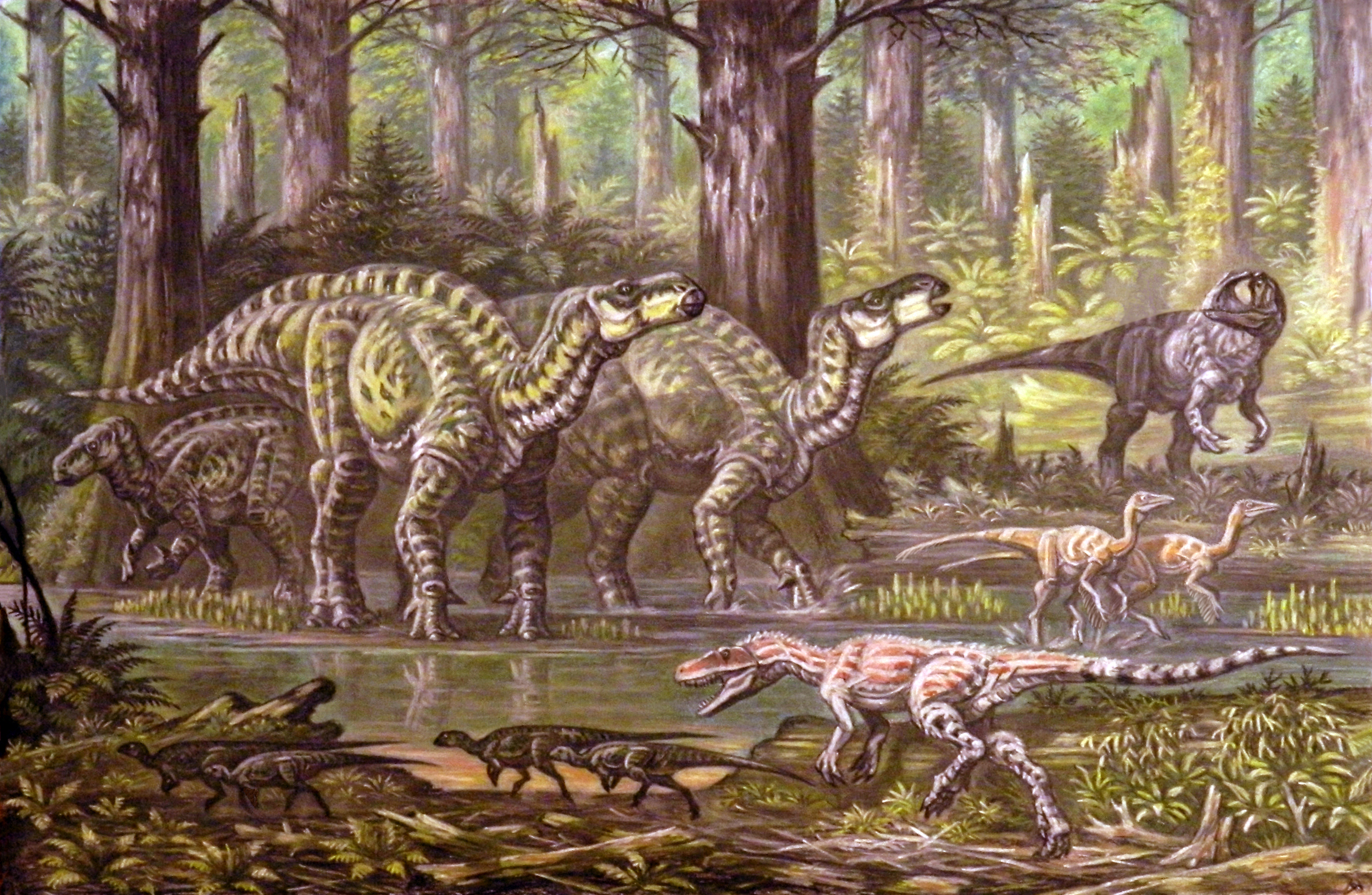
A selection of Wessex Formation dinosaurs: Iguanodon (left), Hypsilophodon pursued by Eotyrannus (foreground), Neovenator (right, background), and basal ornithomimosaurs (right, midground)

Both specimens of Yaverlandia presumably herald from the Wessex Formation. Sedimentological data suggests that the depositional environment of the Wessex Formation was a floodplain intersected by fluvial (river) and lacustrine (lake) deposits. Water levels likely varied throughout the year, due to there being more evaporation than precipitation, though precipitation was regardless quite high. The Wessex Formation seems to have regularly experienced extreme storms and periodic flood events, resulting in debris flows which would have deposited dead organisms in ponds. Burned plant and insect material and fusain suggest that the environment experienced frequent wildfires, stifling much of the dense growth of gymnosperms. Much of the flora of the formed of low ground cover, consisting primarily of pteridophytes, with occasional stands of conifers, cycads and the tree fern Tempskya. Most vertebrate material from the Wessex Formation originates from plant debris beds, resulting from the aforementioned flooding events.

Aside from Yaverlandia, the dinosaur fauna of the Isle of Wight includes the theropods Aristosuchus, Calamospondylus, Ceratosuchops, Eotyrannus, Neovenator, Ornithodesmus, Riparovenator and Thecocoelurus, the sauropods Chondrosteosaurus, Eucamerotus and Ornithopsis, the thyreophorans Polacanthus and Vectipelta, and the ornithopods Brighstoneus, Comptonatus, Hypsilophodon, Iguanodon, Istiorachis, Mantellisaurus, Valdosaurus, and Vectidromeus. The pterosaur fauna of the Wessex Formation consists of Coloborhynchus, Caulkicephalus, Istiodactylus, Vectidraco, and Wightia; multiple unnamed pterosaur taxa, including a ctenochasmatid, are also known. Neosuchian crocodyliforms include Bernissartia, Koumpiodontosuchus and Vectisuchus. Limited evidence exists of elasmosaurids and leptocleidid plesiosaurs. The mammal fauna of the Wessex Formation includes the multituberculate Eobaatar and the spalacotheriid Yaverlestes. Albanerpetontid amphibians are represented by Wesserpeton. The fish fauna of the Wessex Formation, both bony and cartilaginous, is extensive, including hybodontiform and modern sharks (Selachii), pycnodontiforms, Lepidotes and Scheenstia. Invertebrates are represented by an assortment of non-biting midges, hymenopterans (wasps) including multiple parasitoid taxa, coleopterans (beetles), the avicularoid spider Cretamygale, and the ostracod Cypridea.
