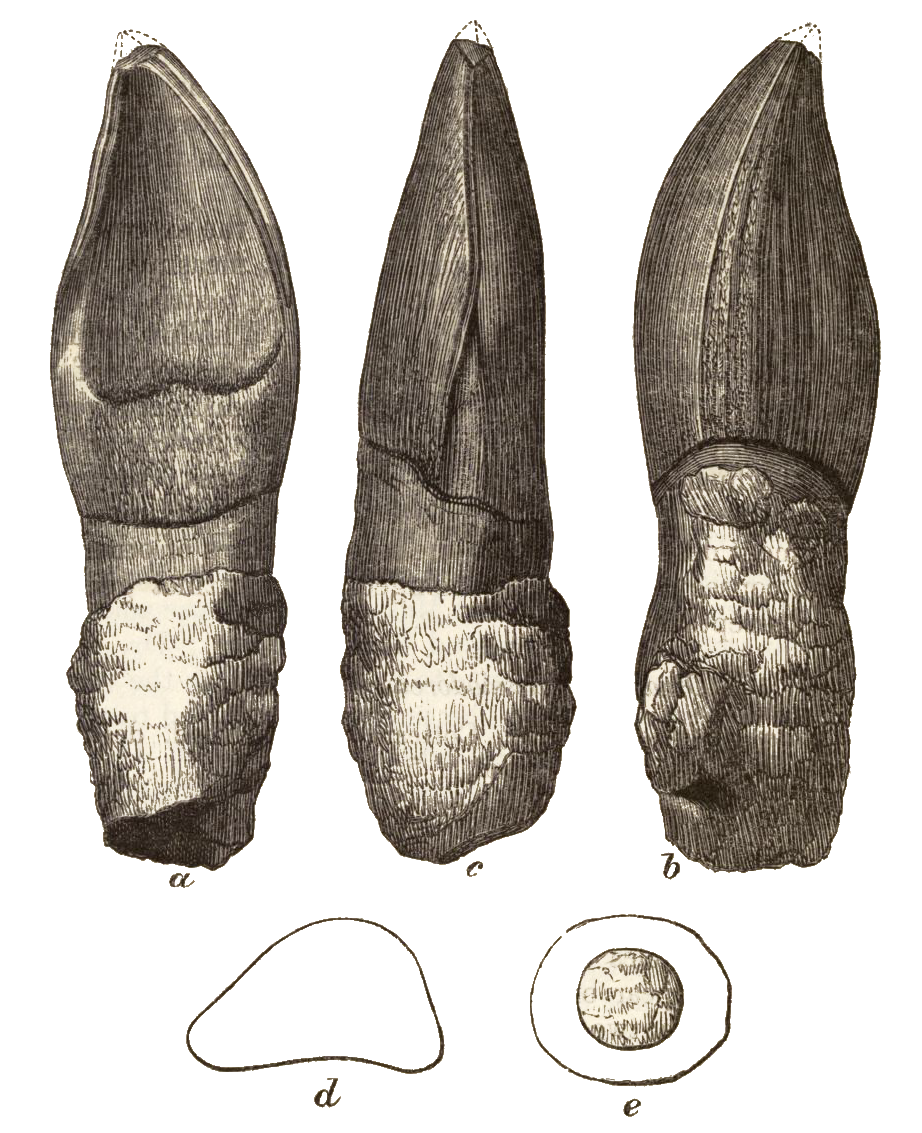
- Illustration of the holotype tooth in multiple views

Scientific classification
- Kingdom: Animalia
- Phylum: Chordata
- Class: Reptilia
- Clade: Dinosauria
- Clade: Saurischia
- Clade: †Sauropodomorpha
- Clade: †Sauropoda
- Clade: †Macronaria
- Genus: †Oplosaurus; Gervais, 1852
- Species: †O. armatus

Binomial name
- †Oplosaurus armatus Gervais, 1852

= Oplosaurus =

Oplosaurus Temporal range: Early Cretaceous 130–125 Ma

Extinct genus of dinosaurs

Oplosaurus (meaning "armed or weapon lizard" or "armoured lizard"; see below for discussion) was a genus of sauropod dinosaur from the Lower Cretaceous (Barremian stage) Wessex Formation of the Isle of Wight, England. It is known from a single tooth usually referred to the contemporaneous "wastebasket taxon" Pelorosaurus, although there is no solid evidence for this.

== History and taxonomy ==
In 1852 geologist Thomas Wright reported the find of a large reptilian tooth from the Wealden Clay near Brixton Bay on Wight. Wright had presented the find to several experts, among them Richard Owen, David Forbes, George Robert Waterhouse and Samuel Pickworth Woodward but only Gideon Mantell came with a useful suggestion pointing to a similarity with the teeth of the dinosaur Hylaeosaurus. Not convinced by this, Wright concluded that the tooth, in view of its sharpness, belonged to a carnivorous reptile of unknown affinities.

Wright had also asked the French paleontologist Paul Gervais for his opinion on the fossil. Gervais in 1852 based the type species Oplosaurus armatus on it. The generic name would normally read as "armoured lizard" from the Greek hoplon, "body armour". The usual story about the — given the fact that Oplosaurus is not known to be armoured — odd choice of name is that Gervais named this large, well-preserved tooth (holotype BMNH R964) under the mistaken belief that its owner was an armoured dinosaur like Hylaeosaurus following Mantell's suggestion. However, recent research by Ben Creisler shows that Gervais compared it to Mosasaurus, not Hylaeosaurus, and that the name may have been intended as "armed lizard", with the teeth as the weapons of a carnivore, as hoplon can also mean "weapon" (although this would make the specific name redundant, as armatus too means "armed" in Latin).

Richard Lydekker (1888) suggested that a maxilla with a tooth (BMNH R751), also from the Isle of Wight, was another exemplar of this animal, but this opinion has not been substantiated. Lydekker also used the improved spelling "Hoplosaurus" but the original Oplosaurus has priority.

The tooth is large, 85 mm (3.35 in) tall in total, with a spatulate crown 52 mm (2.05 in) tall, comparable to Brachiosaurus; it has a pointed tip, a slightly compressed form "cheek" to tongue, a slight convexity to the base of the tongue-facing side, and wear facets. It is vaguely like a Brachiosaurus tooth, which is why the genus has for a time been referred to the Brachiosauridae. Earlier, Oplosaurus was typically referred to Pelorosaurus following an opinion of Friedrich von Huene in 1909, although Pelorosaurus is based on fragmentary remains that do not include teeth, making it impossible to prove the identity. (See Naish and Martill (2001) for a good review of Oplosaurus and Wealden sauropods in general; here is a more recent informal summation of the state of work.)

Given how poor the Pelorosaurus holotype material is, and that it does not include teeth, recent reviews have retained Oplosaurus as a potentially valid but poorly known genus. Darren Naish, a British palaeontologist familiar with Wealden sauropods, has suggested informally that the genus may be a turiasaur but also co-authored an article concluding it was a member of the Camarasauridae. In any case, it likely belongs to the more general Macronaria. A 2016 paper describing turiasaur teeth from Portugal noted that Oplosaurus has the heart-shaped tooth morphology characteristic of the Turiasauria, but pending a more comprehensive understanding of the distribution of this morphology among sauropods, they did not formally refer Oplosaurus to Turiasauria.

== Paleobiology ==
As Naish and Martill point out, the tooth is comparable in size to that of Brachiosaurus, indicating that the owner was a large sauropod; as a possible turiasaur, the size should not change drastically. It would have been a quadrupedal herbivore, possibly around 25 m (82 ft) long.
