= Durlston Formation =

Geologic formation in England

- Stratigraphic range: Berriasian 145–139 Ma
- Type: Formation
- Unit of: Purbeck Group
- Sub-units: Stair Hole Member, Peveril Point Member
- Underlies: Wessex Formation, Ashdown Formation
- Overlies: Lulworth Formation
- Thickness: 18 to 57 m

Lithology
- Primary: limestone and mudstone

Location
- Region: England
- Country: United Kingdom

Type section
- Named for: Durlston Bay

The Durlston Formation is a geologic formation in England. Particularly in the Isle of Purbeck. It preserves fossils dating back to the Berriasian stage of the Lower Cretaceous.

== Vertebrate paleobiota ==
=== Crocodyliformes ===
Crocodyliformes reported from the Durlston Formation
Genus	Species	Location	Stratigraphic position	Material	Notes	Images
Goniopholis	G. simus					

== See also ==
- List of fossiliferous stratigraphic units in England
