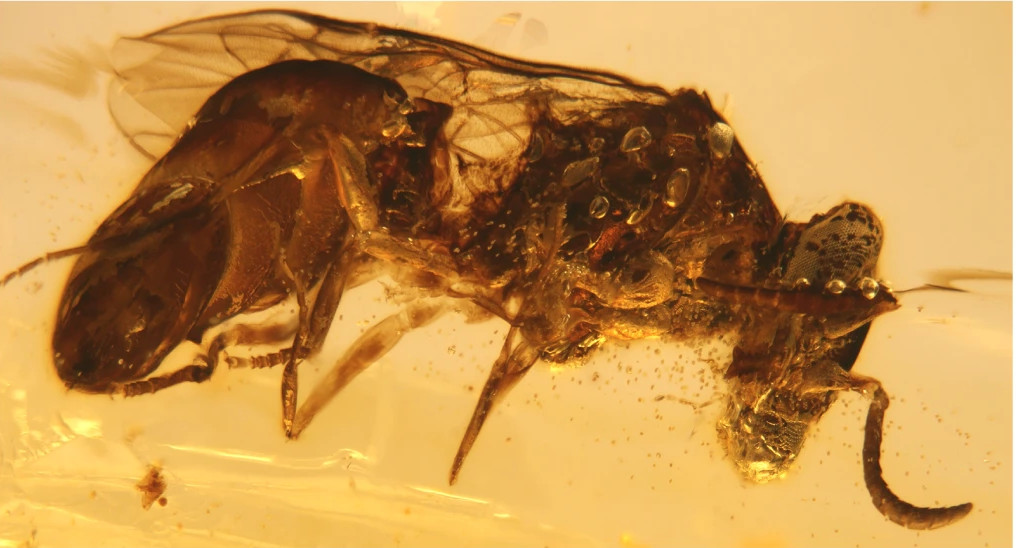
- Prosphex anthophilos, a possible member of Panguidae

Scientific classification
- Kingdom: Animalia
- Phylum: Arthropoda
- Clade: Pancrustacea
- Class: Insecta
- Order: Hymenoptera
- Suborder: Apocrita
- Infraorder: Aculeata
- Superfamily: Panguoidea
- Family: †Panguidae; Li, Rasnitsyn, Shih & Ren, 2019

Genera
- Pangu; Protopangu; Prosphex?

= Panguidae =

Panguidae Temporal range: Early Barremian - earliest Cenomanian 125–100 Ma

Extinct family of wasps

Panguidae is an extinct family of aculeate wasps. It has two unambiguous members, Protopangu known from the Early Cretaceous (early Barremian) amber from the Wessex Formation of southern England and Pangu from the mid-Cretaceous (latest Albian-earliest Cenomanian) Burmese amber of Myanmar. The genus Prosphex, originally considered incertae sedis, was suggested to be a member of the family in a later publication. Their relationships with other aculates are uncertain, and they are considered to be the only members of the superfamily Panguoidea. A specimen of Prosphex was observed with a substantial amount of angiosperm pollen near and within its mouth, implying that it was pollenivorous, and acted as a pollinator for flowering plants. However, other later publications have placed Prosphex outside of Panguidae.
