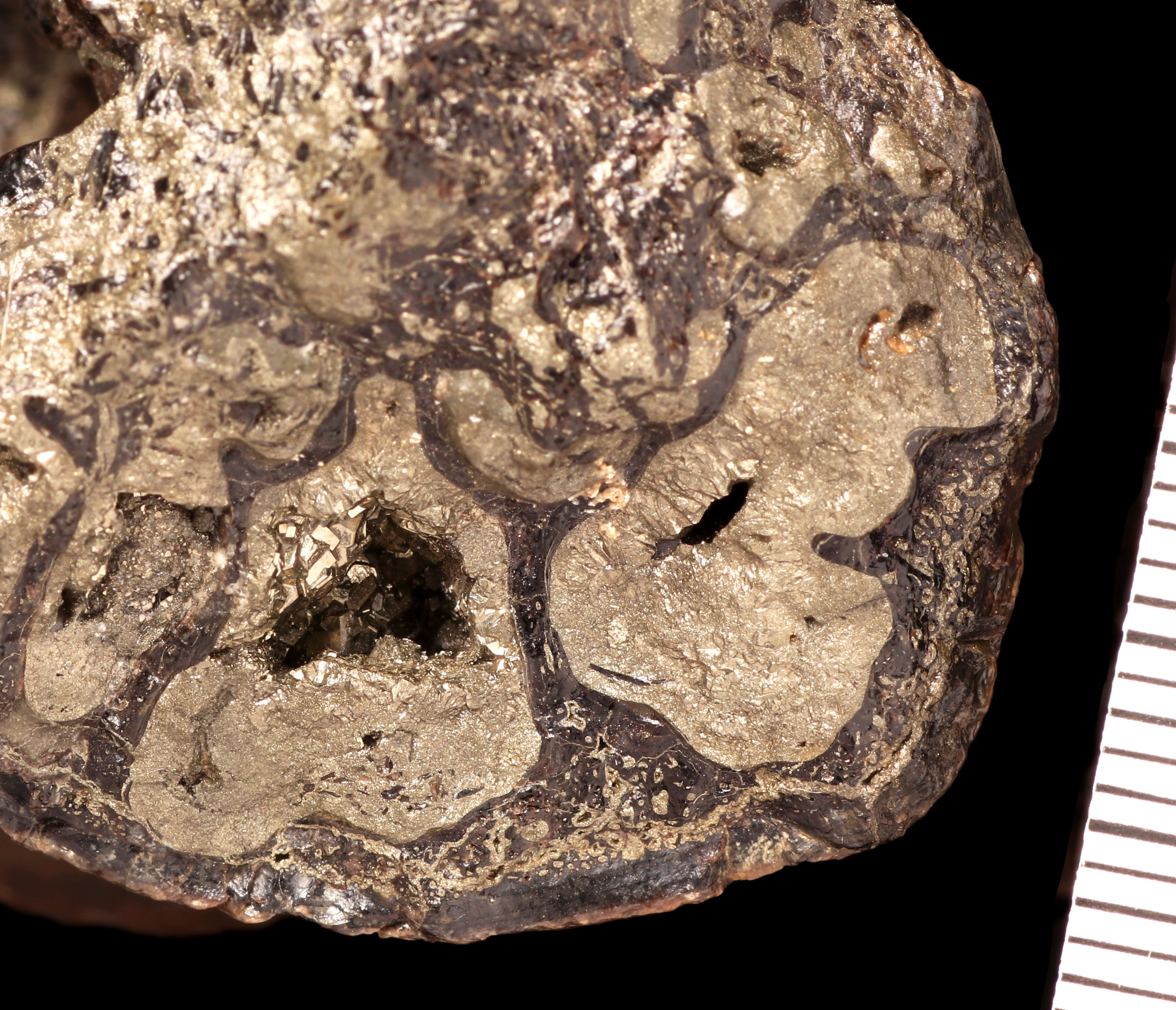
- Camellate pneumaticity inside the dorsal vertebrae of Vectiraptor greeni

Scientific classification
- Kingdom: Animalia
- Phylum: Chordata
- Class: Reptilia
- Clade: Dinosauria
- Clade: Saurischia
- Clade: Theropoda
- Family: †Dromaeosauridae
- Clade: †Eudromaeosauria
- Genus: †Vectiraptor; Longrich, Martill & Jacobs, 2021
- Species: †V. greeni

Binomial name
- †Vectiraptor greeni Longrich, Martill and Jacobs, 2021

= Vectiraptor =

Vectiraptor Temporal range: Barremian, 125 Ma

Dromaeosaurid dinosaur genus from Early Cretaceous England

Vectiraptor (meaning "Isle of Wight thief") is a genus of dromaeosaurid dinosaur from the Barremian aged Wessex Formation of the United Kingdom. The type and only species is Vectiraptor greeni, known from associated dorsal vertebrae and a partial sacrum.

== Discovery and naming ==
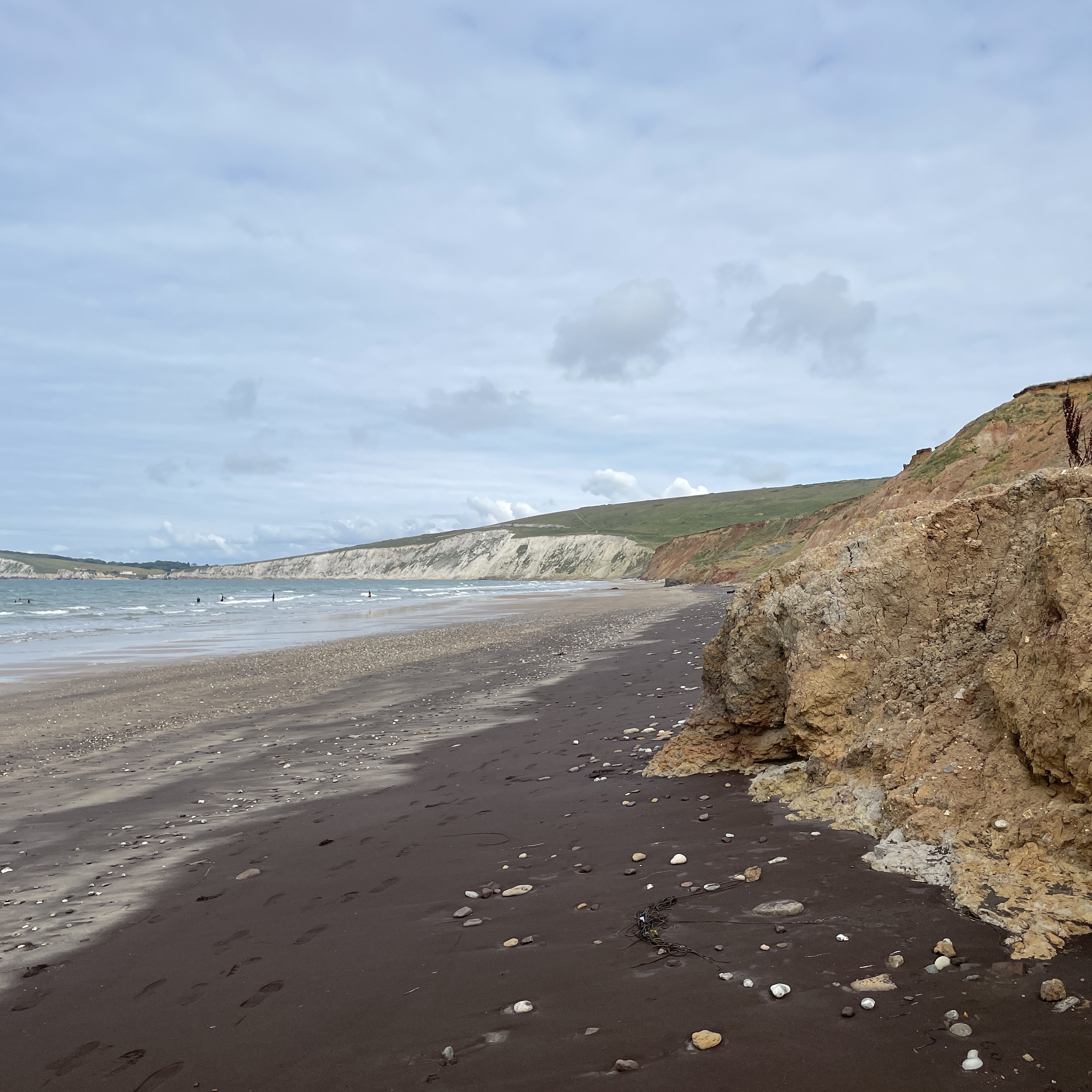
Wessex Formation outcrops at Compton Bay, Isle of Wight, where the holotype was discovered.

Vectiraptor was initially discovered by amateur paleontologist Mick Green in 2004 in rocks of the Wessex Formation, below the cliffs of Compton Bay on the Isle of Wight, United Kingdom. The finds form the holotype IWCMS. 2021.31.1-3, consisting of two dorsal vertebrae. Later a partial sacrum of three vertebrae, IWCMS. 2021.31.2, would be discovered by the late Nick Chase. The element has been determined to belong to the holotype as all fossil elements were discovered over a short time period, and each find was located within several metres of the others. The holotype represents an adult individual, the age of which was estimated at twenty to thirty years on the basis of growth lines in the bone cortex. The vertebrae were donated to the collection of the Isle of Wight County Museum Service.

The type species Vectiraptor greeni, would be erected by Nicholas Longrich, David Michael Martill and Megan Jacobs in 2021. The generic name, Vectiraptor, combines the Latin words Vectis, meaning "the Isle of Wight," and raptor meaning "thief". The specific name, greeni, is in honour of Mick Green who initially discovered and prepared the type material.

Of large and wide dromaeosaurid teeth previously reported from Wight, such as the specimens IWCMS.2002.1, IWCMS.2002.3, IWCMS.2002.4 and BMNH R 16510, the describing authors considered it likely that they in fact belonged to Vectiraptor, though they were not formally referred.

== Description ==
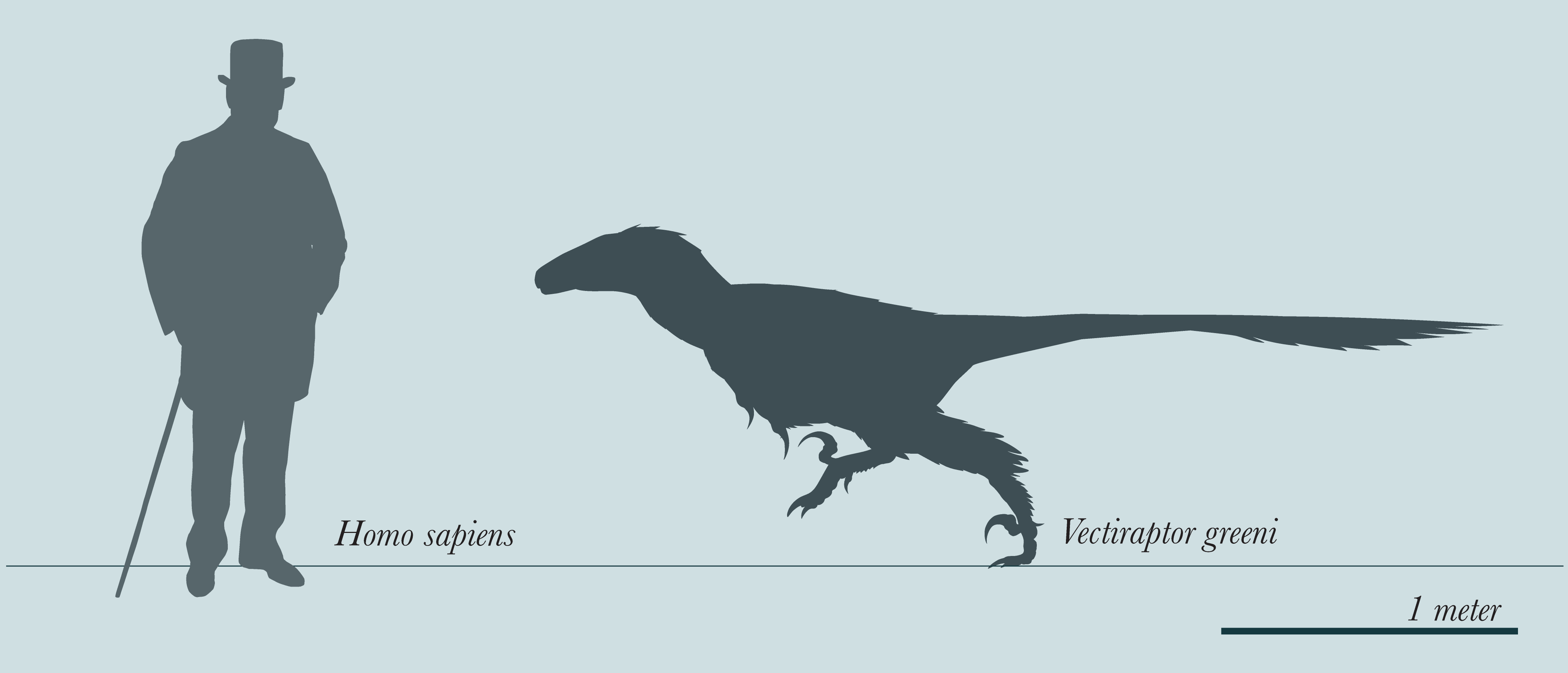
Size of Vectiraptor compared to a human

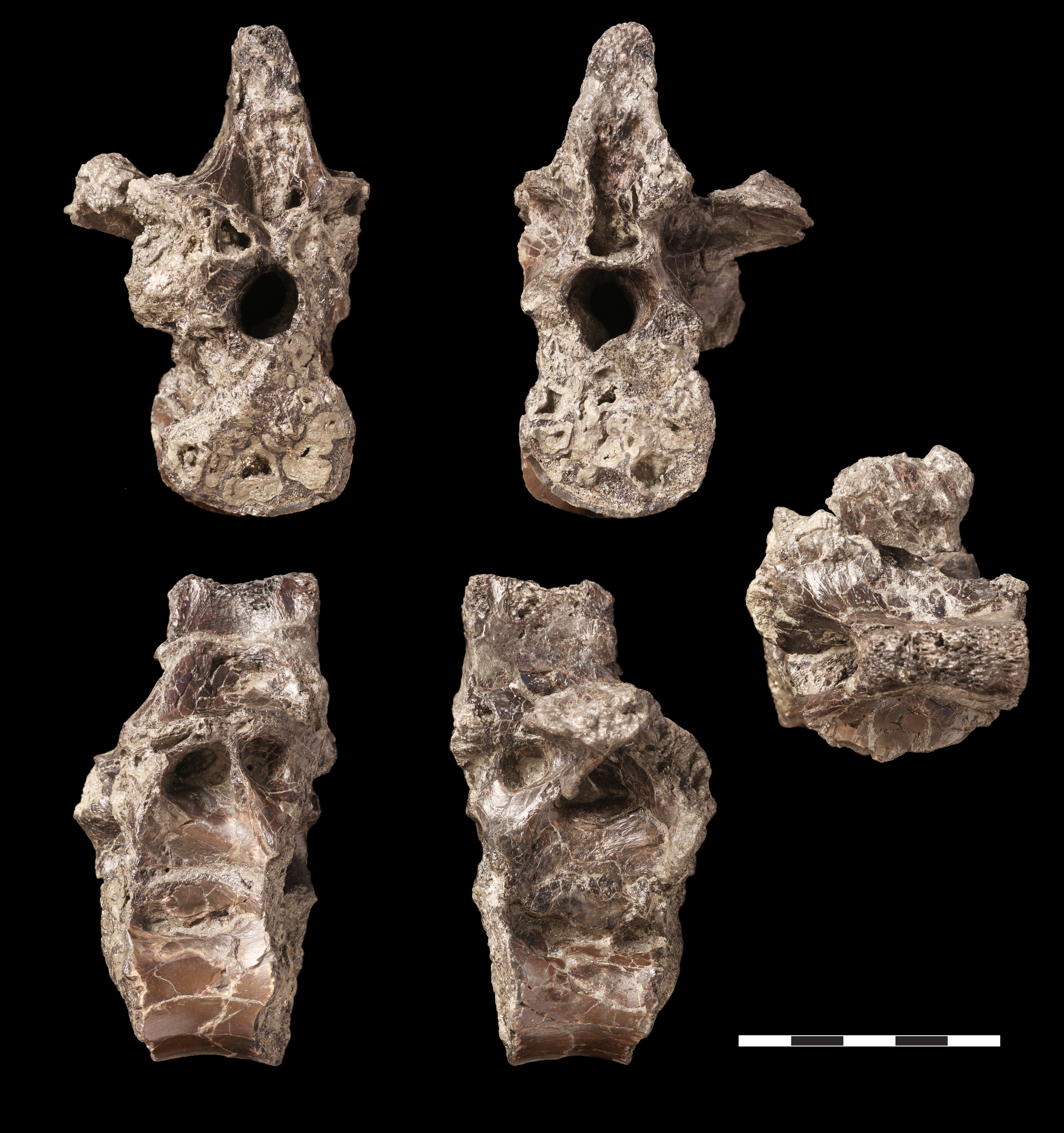
The posterior dorsal

The body length of Vectiraptor was estimated to be 2.5–3 metres (8.2–9.8 ft).

The holotype includes two partial dorsal vertebrae and parts of the sacrum. Although fragmentary, the material shows a combination of features found only in the Dromaeosauridae, including relatively short and massive vertebrae, tall neural spines, and facets for the ribs set on long stalks.

Two autapomorphies, or unique derived traits, were established. With the front vertebrae of the back, the usual deep triangular depression at the underside of the side process is subdivided by an extra ridge. The neural spines are robust with wide rough depressions for the attachment of ligaments.

The vertebrae showed extensive pneumatisation. The dorsals had pleurocoels through which the air sacs of the respiratory system entered the vertebral bodies, forming large camellate air spaces. The diapophysal fossa also invaded the neural arch. The neural canals were expanded to behind, embaying the top of the centrum. The sacral vertebrae lacked pleurocoels and had a spongy bone structure. Their combined neural canal was so wide however, that it might have contained an air chamber, accessed by spaces between their partially fused neural arches.

== Phylogeny ==
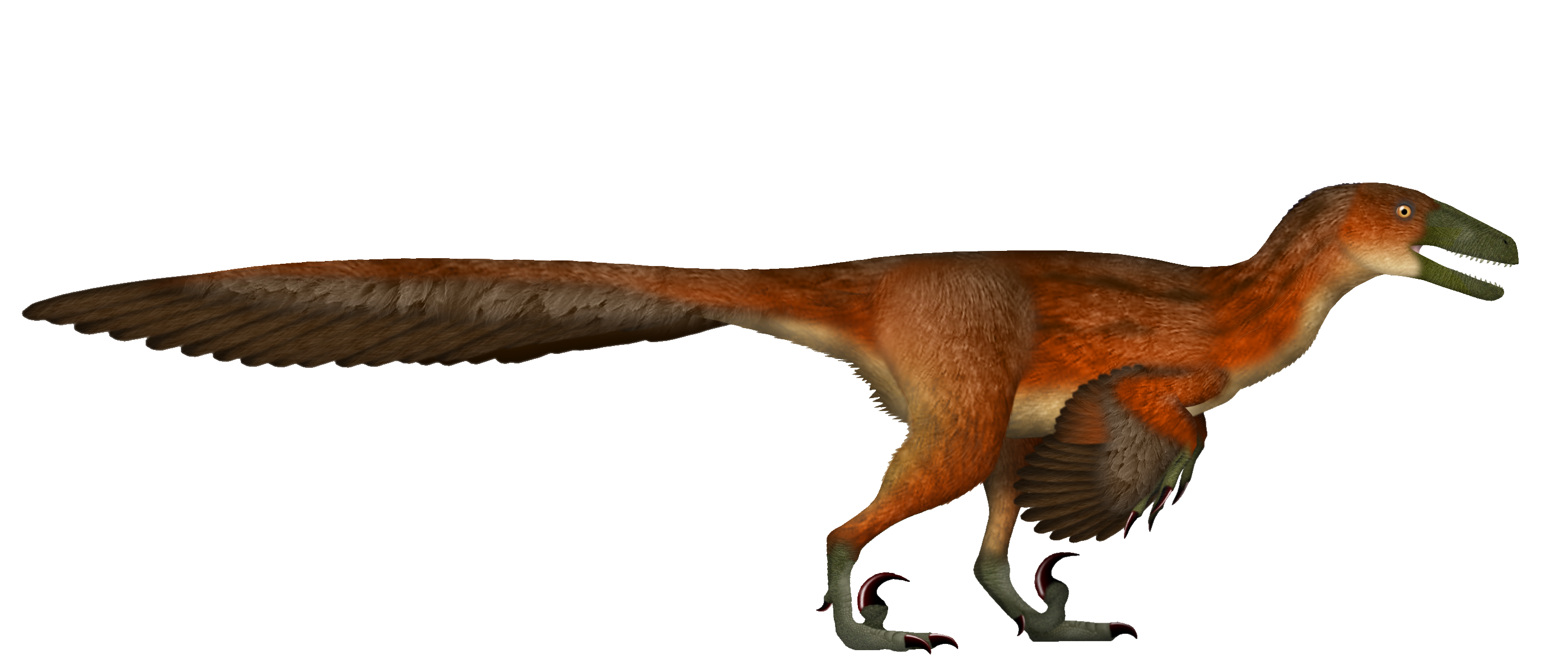
Life restoration

A number of features, including the animal's large size, short dorsals, the presence of openings in the posterior dorsal vertebrae for air sacs, and the tall and narrow in side view neural spines with ligament scars, suggest the animal is a member of, or related to, the Eudromaeosauria. The resemblance to eudromaeosaurs from North America suggests a faunal exchange between North America and Europe.
