= Chilton Chine =

Geological feature on the Isle of Wight, England

Coordinates: 50.64°N 1.42°W

Chilton Chine on the Isle of Wight

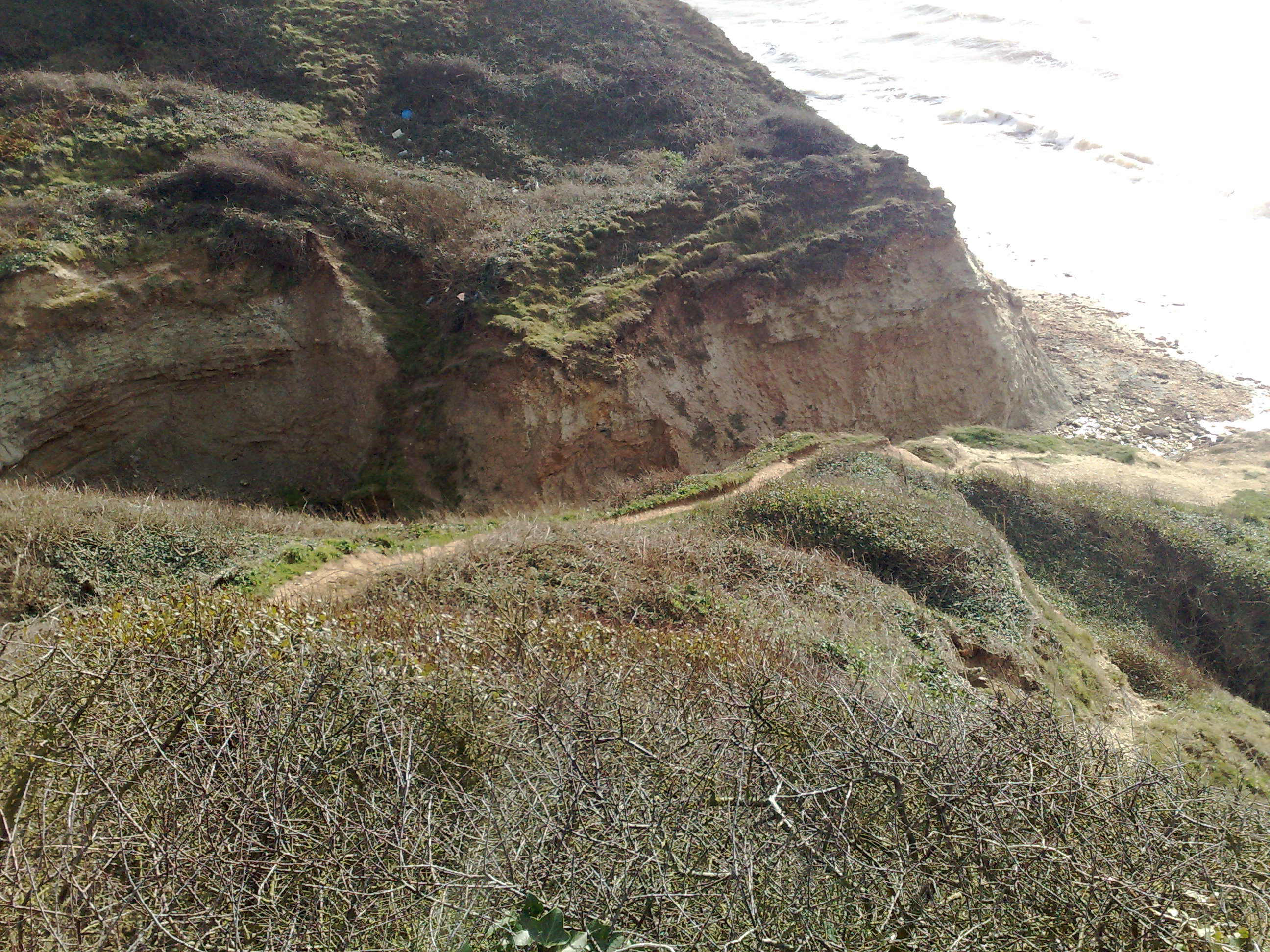
Chilton Chine

The Chilton Chine is a geological feature on the south-west coast of the Isle of Wight, England. It lies to the west of the village of Brighstone. It is a small coastal gully, one of many of such chines on the island created by stream erosion of soft Cretaceous rocks.

== Name ==
The name probably means 'the farmstead or estate near the deep gorge or gully', from Old English ceole and tūn, referring to the chine. It is less likely the name means 'the farmstead or estate belonging to a man called Cēola' from Old English Cēola (personal name) and tūn. Chilton Chine is marked on Andrew's Map, 1769.

== Overview ==
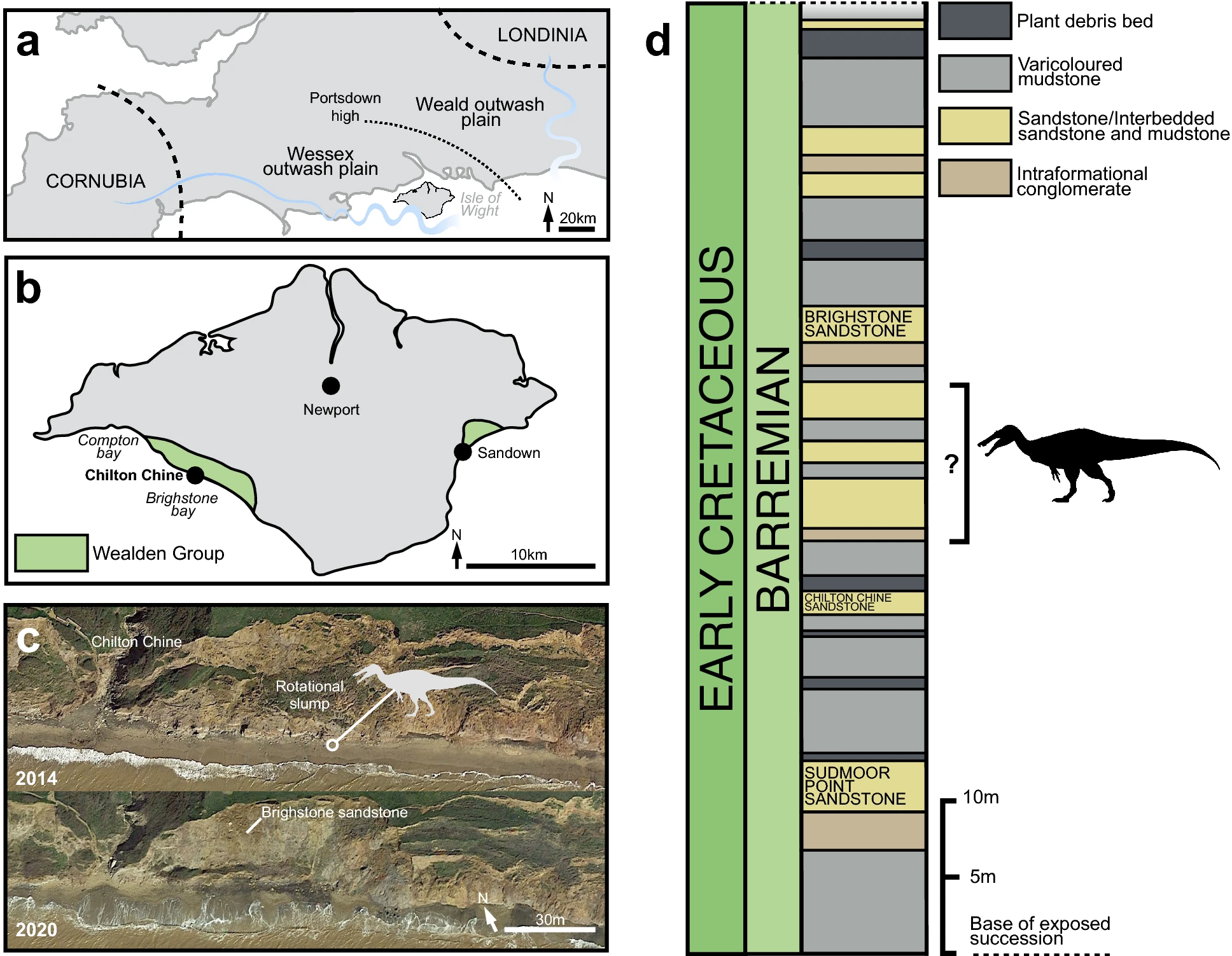
Locality information and stratigraphy of Chilton Chine

It runs from the hamlet of Chilton Green down to the A3055 Military Road where it passes under the road and continues for about 200m to the beach at Brighstone Bay. The sides of the gully are fairly shallow and allow the growth of hardy bushes, scrub and rough grasses.

The Chine drains water off the mainly flat agricultural land surrounding Chilton Green. Important fossils have been found in the chine.

To the east of the Chilton Chine is the Isle of Wight Pearl Centre, a tourist attraction which overlooks the chine.

The Isle of Wight Coastal Path follows the top of the chine from the cliff edge to the carpark next to the A3055.
