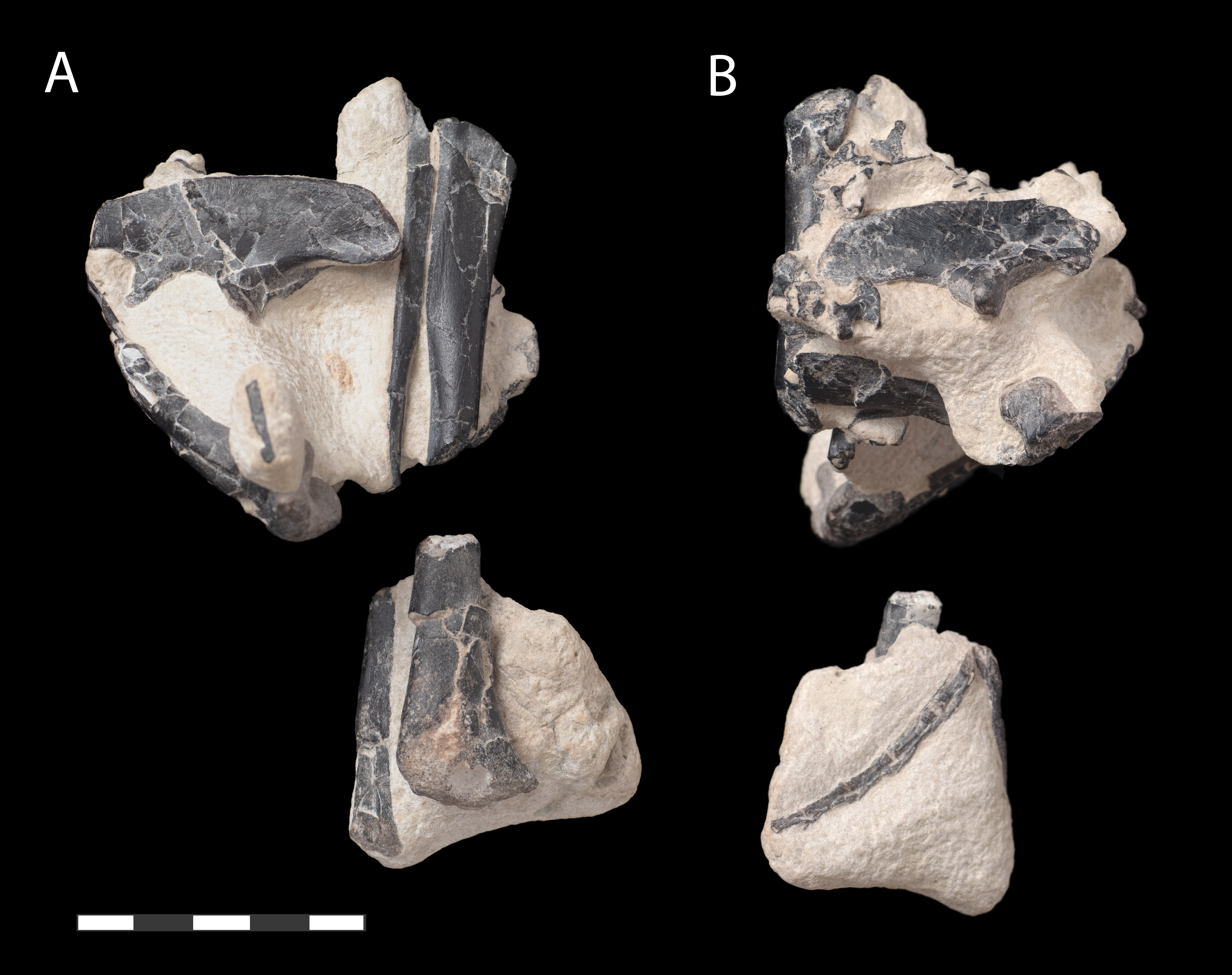
- Type specimen of Vectidromeus

Scientific classification
- Kingdom: Animalia
- Phylum: Chordata
- Class: Reptilia
- Clade: Dinosauria
- Clade: †Ornithischia
- Clade: †Ornithopoda
- Family: †Dryosauridae (?)
- Genus: †Vectidromeus; Longrich et al., 2024
- Species: †V. insularis

Binomial name
- †Vectidromeus insularis Longrich et al., 2024

= Vectidromeus =

Vectidromeus Temporal range: Early Cretaceous, Barremian

Genus of hypsilophodontid dinosaurs

Vectidromeus (meaning "Isle of Wight runner") is an extinct genus of hypsilophodontid ornithopod dinosaur from the Early Cretaceous Wessex Formation of England. The genus contains a single species, V. insularis, known from a partial skeleton belonging to a juvenile individual.

== Discovery and naming ==
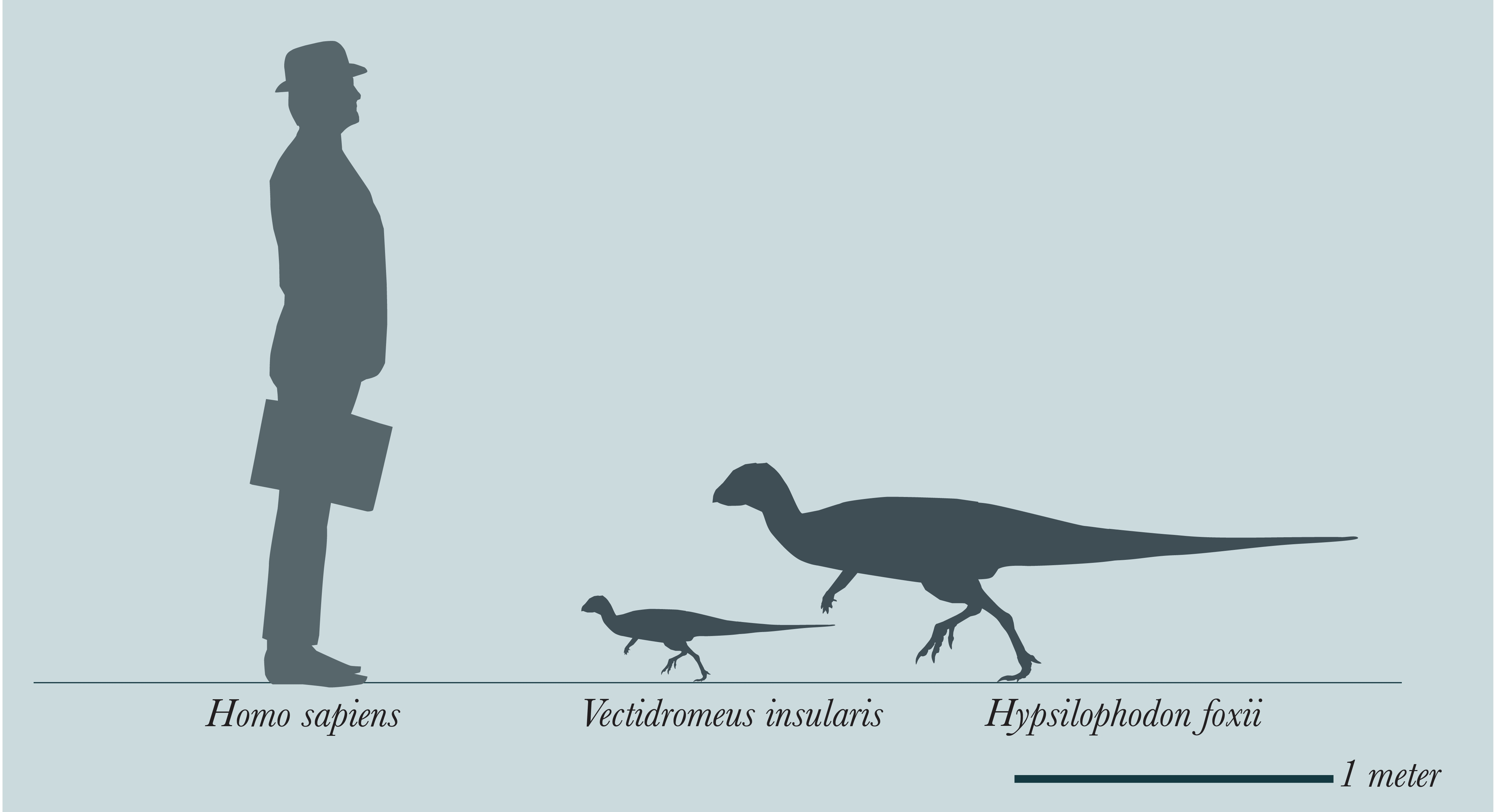
The type specimen of Vectidromeus, shown to scale with a human and Hypsilophodon

The Vectidromeus holotype specimen, IWCMS 2023.102, was discovered in sediments of the Wessex Formation near Sudmoor Point on the Isle of Wight, England. It consists of an incomplete skeleton presumably belonging to a juvenile individual, including partial dorsal and caudal vertebrae, both ilia, the left pubis, both ischia, an incomplete right femur and tibia, a left femur, tibia and fibula, and a partial left pes. Although the specimen is a juvenile, it differs from juveniles of Hypsilophodon and comes from much lower in the Wessex Formation, suggesting it represents a distinct species.

In 2024 (made available in 2023 as a non-finalized pre-proof), Longrich et al. described Vectidromeus insularis as a new genus and species of hypsilophodontid ornithopod based on these fossil remains. The generic name, "Vectidromeus", combines "Vectis", the Roman name for the Isle of Wight, with the Greek word δρομεύς, "dromeus", meaning "runner". The specific name, "insularis", is a Latin word meaning "insular".

== Classification ==
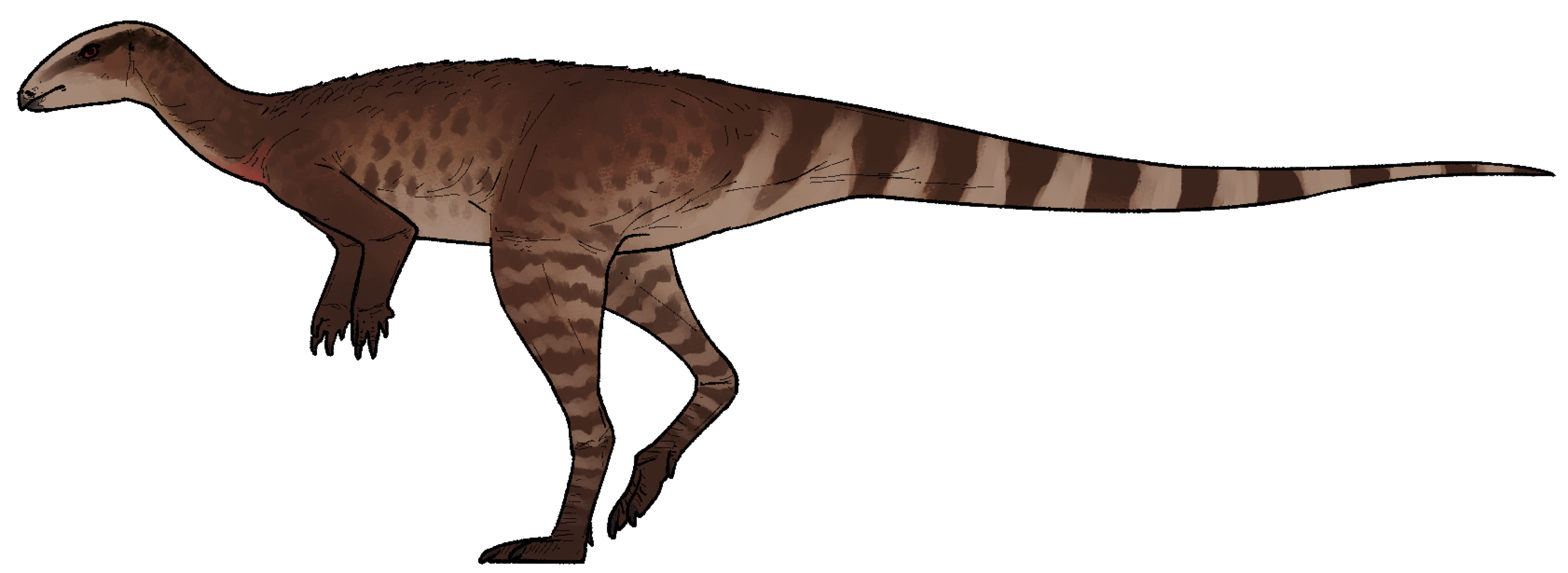
Speculative life restoration as a hypsilophodontid

In their 2024 description of Vectidromeus, Longrich et al. classified it as a member of the controversial clade Hypsilophodontidae based on purported general skeletal similarities to Hypsilophodon. However, they did not perform a phylogenetic analysis to test this rigorously. In 2024, Fonseca et al. discussed the relationships of this taxon based on specific anatomical characters. They determined that Vectidromeus could be referred to the Euiguanodontia, and possibly more precisely the Dryosauridae, and that it was not particularly closely related to Hypsilophodon.
