= Dinosaurs of the Isle of Wight =

The Isle of Wight is one of the richest dinosaur localities in Europe, with over 20 species of dinosaur having been recognised from the early Cretaceous Period (in particular between 132 and 110 million years ago), some of which were first identified on the island, as well as the contemporary non-dinosaurian species of crocodile, turtle and pterosaur.

Compton Bay, near Freshwater features dinosaur footprints which are visible at low tide.

== Geological strata ==
The Isle of Wight has layers of the Vectis and Wealden fossil-bearing beds exposed on the southern half of the island. These are revealed in the cliffs of Yaverland, close to Sandown, and at Hanover Point and Whale Chine, along the southwestern coast.

== The Cretaceous habitat ==
The island's dinosaurs come from the Wessex Formation, which dates from between 125 and 110 million years ago (mya). During this time the Isle of Wight, then located on a latitude at which North Africa resides today, had a subtropical environment and was part of a large river valley complex, which ran along the south coast of England to Belgium. It was a world of ponds, rivers and swamps, so it had conditions favourable for the formation of fossils.

Animal remains from this time include crocodiles, turtles, pterosaurs, mammals and possibly some birds. In the water were snails, fish and mussels.

As this environment did not change much, over the course of 10 million years, a large number of fossils were formed, so the island today is a very rich source.

== List of dinosaur species and genera ==
Unless otherwise specified, the following is a list of dinosaurs for which almost complete skeletons have been found on the island. There are also many more species, known only from a single or very few bones.

=== Order Ornithischia ===
- Suborder Ornithopoda ("bird-footed", bipedal herbivores)
  - Iguanodon bernissartensis
  - Brighstoneus simmondsi, partial skeleton with skull and lower jaw
  - Mantellisaurus atherfieldensis
  - Comptonatus chasei
  - Valdosaurus canaliculatus (known from partial material)
  - Istiorachis macarthurae, partial postcranial skeleton
  - Hypsilophodon foxii: Named after Rev. William Fox, a fossil collector of the Isle of Wight who found several skeletons.
  - Vectidromeus insularis
- Suborder Thyreophora ("shield-bearers", armored herbivorous dinosaurs)
  - Polacanthus foxii: Also named after the Reverend Fox. Notable as no head to the specimen has ever been found and reconstructions are based upon suppositions from similar ankylosaurians.
  - Vectipelta barretti

=== Order Saurischia ===
- Suborder Sauropodomorpha ("sauropod-like", giant long-necked herbivores)
  - The 'Barnes High' sauropod: A member of the Brachiosauridae family, most likely Eucamerotus or Pelorosaurus, in the collection of Dinosaur Farm. This is the most complete specimen from the Wealden era "including presacral vertebrae, anterior caudal vertebrae, girdle and limb elements".
  - Iuticosaurus valdensis
  - Oplosaurus armatus, a single tooth
  - Ornithopsis hulkei, posterior dorsal vertebra, a right pubis and ischium
  - Chondrosteosaurus gigas, two neck vertebrae
  - Eucamerotus foxi, vertebrae found in 1852

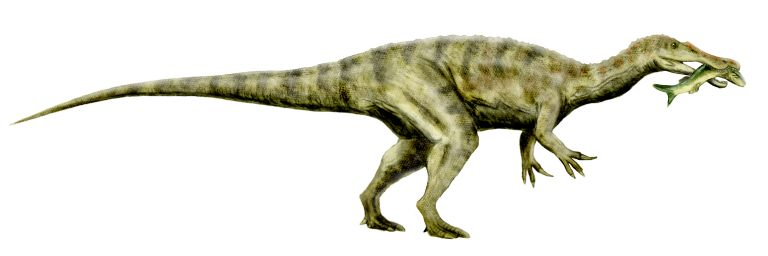
Baryonyx, a large theropod, was found with fish scales in its stomach, indicating that it may have been a piscivore.

- Suborder Theropoda ("beast foot", bipedal carnivores)
  - Aristosuchus pusillus, a compsognathid
  - Baryonyx walkeri: Teeth are common on the Island. Hand bones have also been found.
  - Calamosaurus foxi
  - Calamospondylus oweni
  - Ceratosuchops inferodios
  - Eotyrannus lengi: A tyrannosauroid. First identified in 1997 and named in 2001 from a single specimen found on the island.
  - Neovenator salerii: The holotype skeleton was found on the island in 1978 but not described until 1996.
  - Ornithodesmus cluniculus
  - Riparovenator milnerae
  - Thecocoelurus daviesi, partial vertebrae
  - Vectiraptor greeni, two partial dorsal vertebrae and parts of the sacrum found in 2003 and described in 2021.
  - Vectaerovenator inopinatus, found in 2019 from 4 vertebrae and named in 2020.
  - Yaverlandia bitholus: The holotype partial skull was found at Yaverland. It was initially believed to have belonged to a pachycephalosaurian.

== See also ==
- List of dinosaur finds in the United Kingdom

== Other meanings ==
Dinosaurs of the Isle of Wight (Palaeontological Association, 2001) ISBN 0-901702-72-2, is also the title of a field guide to dinosaurs found on the island, by Darren Naish and David Martill.
