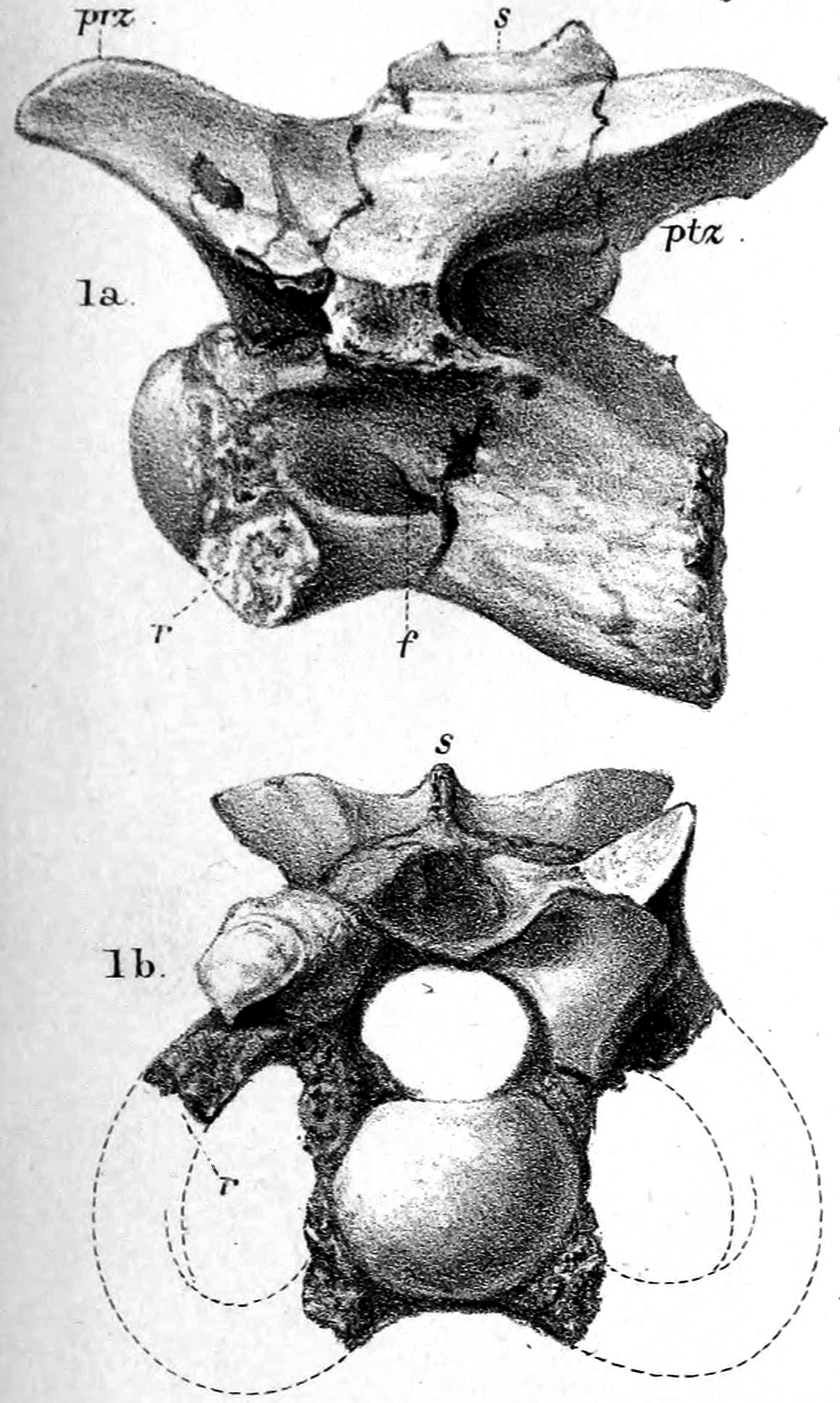
- Cervical vertebra of Calamosaurus foxi

Scientific classification
- Kingdom: Animalia
- Phylum: Chordata
- Class: Reptilia
- Clade: Dinosauria
- Clade: Saurischia
- Clade: Theropoda
- Clade: Avetheropoda
- Clade: Coelurosauria
- Genus: †Calamosaurus; Lydekker, 1891
- Species: †C. foxi

Binomial name
- †Calamosaurus foxi (Lydekker, 1889 [originally Calamospondylus])

Synonyms
- Calamospondylus foxi Lydekker, 1889

= Calamosaurus =

Calamosaurus Temporal range: Early Cretaceous, Barremian

Extinct genus of dinosaurs

Calamosaurus (meaning "reed lizard") is a genus of small theropod dinosaur, from the Early Cretaceous of the Isle of Wight, England. It is based on two cervical vertebrae (NHMUK PV R 901), collected by Reverend William Fox. These fossils come from sedimentary rocks of the Wessex Formation and are Barremian in age. The type species of Calamosaurus, named Calamospondylus foxi by Richard Lydekker, was named in honour of Fox. Calamospondylus, however, was a preoccupied name, forcing Lydekker to change the genus name to Calamosaurus. This has subsequently led to immense confusion, with some authors believing the two genera to be synonymous. The systematic position of Calamosaurus within theropods has been controversial, and placements within Compsognathidae and Ornithomimosauria have been suggested. More recently, researchers have suggested affinities with the Tyrannosauroidea and Alvarezsauroidea.

== Discovery and naming ==
The type specimen, NHMUK PV R 901, consisting of two articulated cervical (neck) vertebrae, was part of the "Fox collection", a collection of fossils collected by the Rev. William Fox which were given to the Natural History Museum in London on his death. When cataloguing the Fox collection, Richard Lydekker came across these bones and named them Calamospondylus foxi. The name derives from the Ancient Greek kalamos ('reed', 'reed pen') and spondylos ('vertebra') and hints at the slender and lightweight build of the vertebrae. Unbeknownst to Lydekker, the name Calamospondylus had already been coined in 1866 (by Reverend Fox himself, the very man honored in Lydekker's species name). Upon realising his mistake, Lydekker promptly renamed it, creating the new combination Calamosaurus foxi (from the Latin sauros, "lizard") in 1891.

=== Possible second specimen ===
In the same work, Lydekker provisionally assigned the right tibia NHMUK R.186, which was discovered by William D. Fox in 1865 or 1866, to Calamosaurus; this specimen was later identified as being a basal or nonspecific coelurosaur, possibly a compsognathid, and has more recently been referred to the clade Ornithomimosauria. Darren Naish noted in 2011 that there is "no firm basis" for the assignment of NHMUK R.186 to Calamosaurus.

== Classification ==
The initial mistake made by Lydekker has led to immense confusion regarding the validity of Calamosaurus. Many authors have regarded it as a junior synonym of Calamospondylus, despite the lack of overlapping material. Beyond that, it was subsequently regarded by Lydekker as a synonym of Aristosuchus. Some authors have opted to relegate Calamosaurus to the status of a nomen dubium due to its fragmentary condition and ambiguous taxonomy, although this view is not universal. In 2011, Darren Naish supported the validity of the genus, and noted similarities with the Chinese taxon Dilong paradoxus that are indicative of a basal position within Tyrannosauroidea, though did caution against the assignment of further remains to the genus considering its fragmentary state. A paper from 2026 tentatively identified C. foxi as a basal alvarezsauroid.

== Description ==
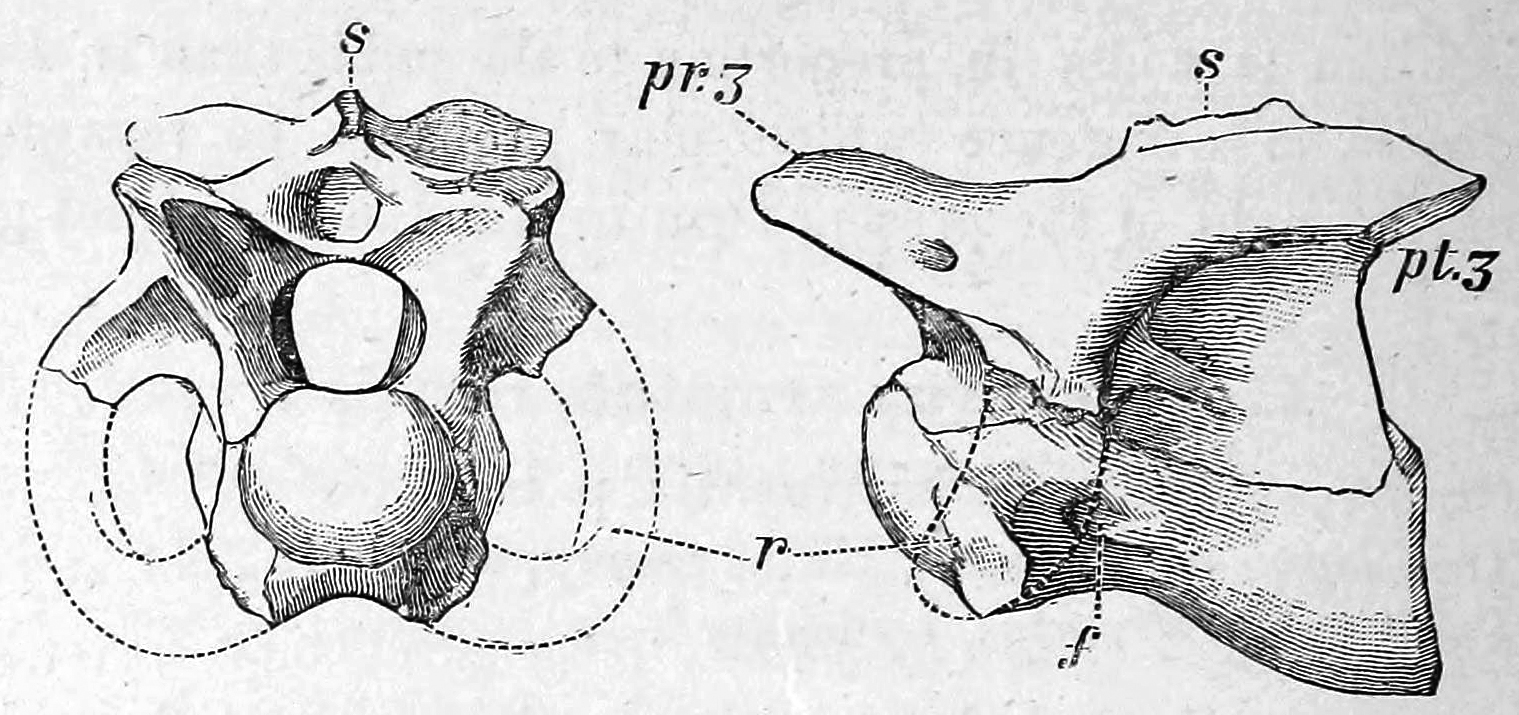
Illustration of one of the holotype vertebrae

In 2001, Darren Naish, Steve Hutt, and David Martill estimated that Calamosaurus may have reached a body length of 3.5 m (11 ft). Initially, they noted that the fusion of the neural arches to the vertebral centra (the main body of each vertebra) suggests that it was fully grown at the time of its death; however, in a 2011 work, Naish noted that the neurocentral sutures of the specimen were not fully closed, suggesting that it had not reached full skeletal maturity. He did, however, support the initial size estimate for the specimen. Both of the holotype Calamospondylus cervical (neck) vertebrae are about 40 mm (1.6 in) in length. They are opisthocoelous, meaning that they are convex anteriorly (towards the front), and concave posteriorly (towards the rear), with offset articular facets, similar to those of Dilong. The cervical vertebrae were at one point interpreted as lacking epipophyses entirely, suggesting a small, lightly built head; whilst they are indeed present, they are very strongly reduced.

== Palaeoecology ==
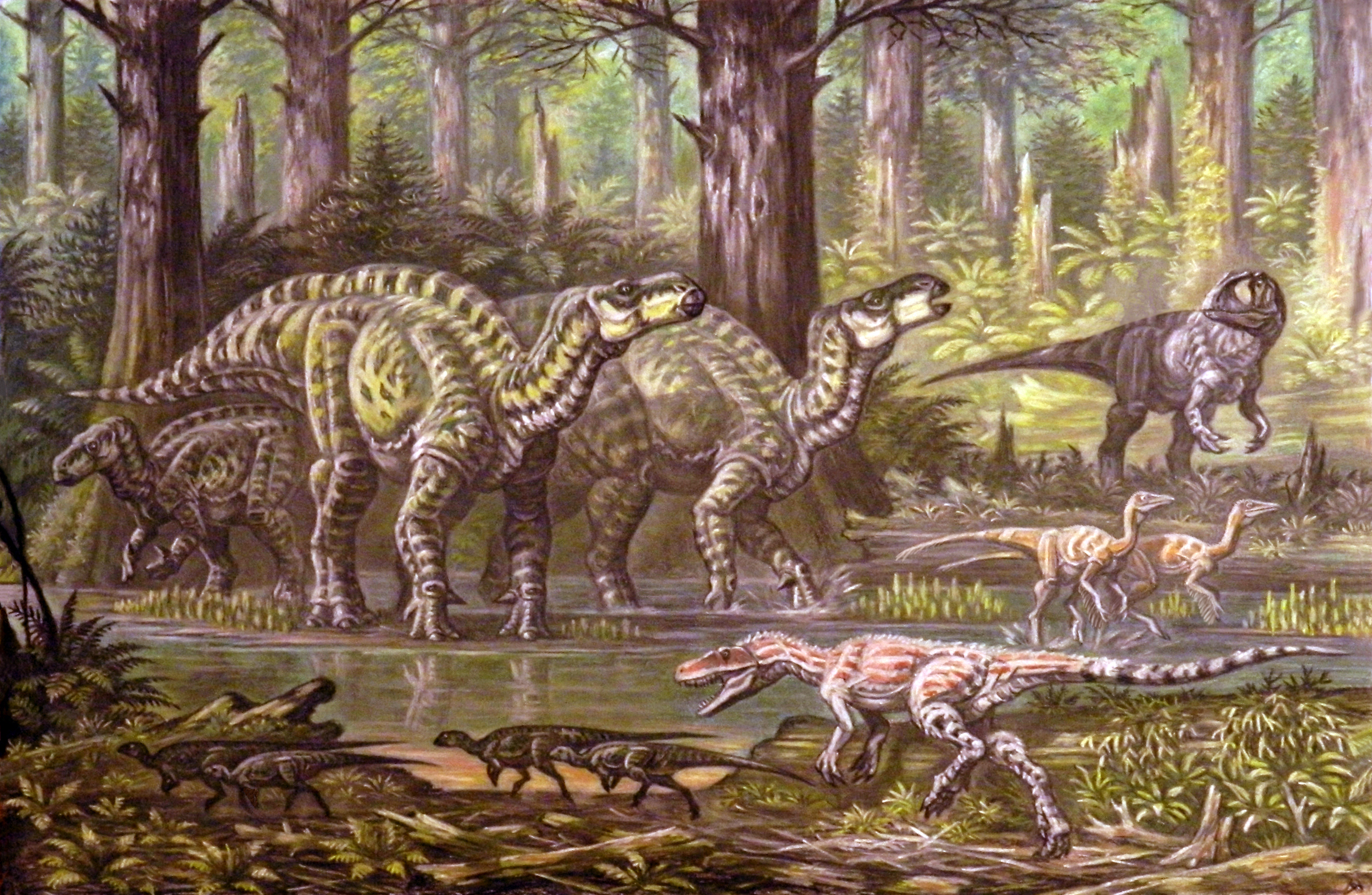
A selection of Wessex Formation dinosaurs. On the left is Iguanodon. In the foreground is a group of Hypsilophodon being pursued by an Eotyrannus. In the right background is a Neovenator. In the midground is a pair of basal ornithomimosaurs.

The holotype of Calamosaurus heralds from the Wessex Formation. Sedimentological data suggests that the depositional environment of the Wessex Formation was a floodplain intersected by fluvial (river) and lacustrine (lake) deposits. Water levels likely varied throughout the year, due to there being more evaporation than precipitation, though precipitation was regardless quite high. The Wessex seems to have regularly experienced extreme storms and periodic flood events, resulting in debris flows which would have deposited dead organisms in ponds. Burned plant and insect material and fusain suggests that the environment experienced frequent wildfires, stifling for the most part the dense growth of gymnosperms. Much of the flora of the formed of low ground cover, consisting primarily of pteridophytes, with occasional stands of conifers, cycads and the tree fern Tempskya. Most vertebrate material from the Wessex Formation originates from plant debris beds, resulting from the aforementioned flooding events.

Aside from Calamosaurus, the dinosaur fauna of the Isle of Wight includes the theropods Aristosuchus, Calamospondylus, Ceratosuchops, Eotyrannus, Invictibellatrix, Neovenator, Ornithodesmus, Riparovenator, Thecocoelurus, and Yaverlandia, the sauropods Chondrosteosaurus, Eucamerotus and Ornithopsis, the thyreophorans Polacanthus and Vectipelta, and the ornithopods Brighstoneus, Comptonatus, Hypsilophodon, Iguanodon, Mantellisaurus, Valdosaurus and Vectidromeus. The pterosaur fauna of the Wessex Formation consists of Coloborhynchus, Caulkicephalus, Istiodactylus, Vectidraco, and Wightia; multiple unnamed pterosaur taxa, including a ctenochasmatid, are also known. Neosuchian crocodyliforms include Bernissartia, Koumpiodontosuchus and Vectisuchus. Limited evidence exists of elasmosaurids and leptocleidid plesiosaurs. The mammal fauna of the Wessex Formation includes the multituberculate Eobataar and the spalacotheriid Yaverlestes. Albanerpetontid amphibians are represented by Wesserpeton. The fish fauna of the Wessex Formation, both bony and cartilaginous, is extensive, including hybodontiform and modern sharks (Selachii), pycnodontiforms, Lepidotes and Scheenstia. Invertebrates are represented by an assortment of non-biting midges, hymenopterans (wasps) including multiple parasitoid taxa, coleopterans (beetles), the avicularoid spider Cretamygale, and the ostracod Cypridea.
