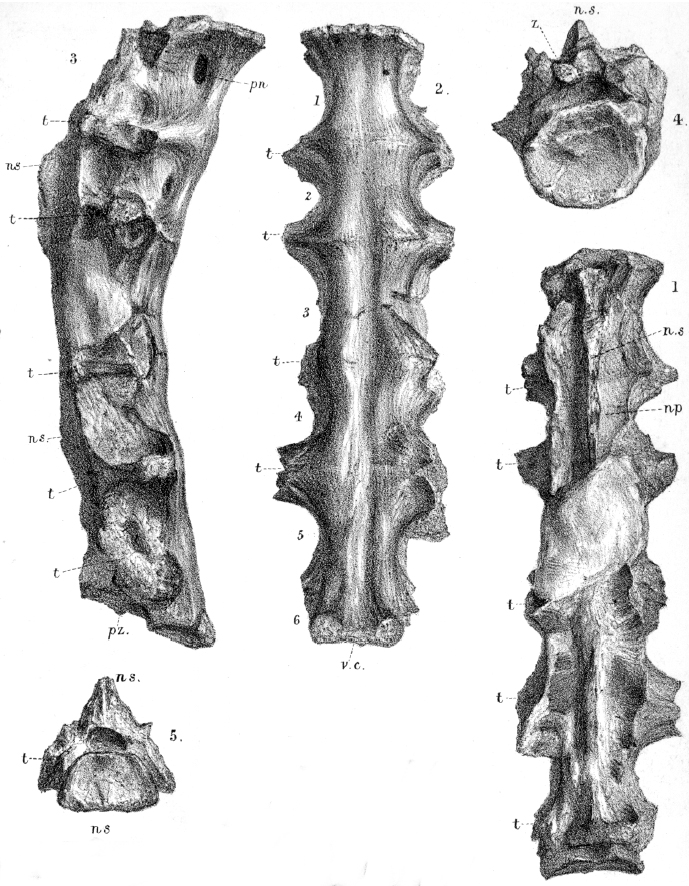
- Illustration of the holotype sacrum in multiple views

Scientific classification
- Kingdom: Animalia
- Phylum: Chordata
- Class: Reptilia
- Clade: Dinosauria
- Clade: Saurischia
- Clade: Theropoda
- Family: †Dromaeosauridae
- Genus: †Ornithodesmus; Seeley, 1887
- Species: †O. cluniculus

Binomial name
- †Ornithodesmus cluniculus Seeley, 1887

= Ornithodesmus =

Ornithodesmus Temporal range: Early Cretaceous, 125 Ma

Extinct genus of dinosaurs

Ornithodesmus (meaning "bird link") is a genus of small, dromaeosaurid dinosaur from the Isle of Wight in England, dating to about 125 million years ago. The name, along with that of the type and only species, O. cluniculus, was originally assigned to a bird-like sacrum (a series of vertebrae fused to the hip bones), initially believed to come from a bird and subsequently identified as a pterosaur. More complete pterosaur remains were later assigned to Ornithodesmus. More recently, a detailed analysis determined that the original specimen in fact came from a small theropod, specifically a dromaeosaur, making it one of the first dromaeosaurs known to science. All pterosaurian material previously assigned to this genus has been renamed Istiodactylus.

== Discovery and naming ==
Ornithodesmus cluniculus was first described by Harry Govier Seeley in 1887, based on a set of six fused vertebrae from the hip (sacrum), specimen number BMNH R187. The specimen was found by the Rev.William Fox in Wessex Formation sediments from Brook Bay, on the Isle of Wight. After his death, the so-called "Fox collection" fell into the hands of the British Museum of Natural History, in London (now the Natural History Museum, London). Seeley believed that BMNH R187 belonged to some kind of primitive bird, noting that it "approximates towards Dinosaurs [sic] in a way of which no bird had previously given evidence". Accordingly, he gave it the genus name Ornithodesmus, meaning "bird link", from Greek ὄρνις (ornis), "bird", en δεσμός (desmos), "link". The specific name he gave it, cluniculus, means "little buttock" in Latin, a reference to the small thigh muscles indicated by the size and anatomy of the specimen.

== Classification ==
Later in 1887, John Hulke (writing anonymously) suggested the remains actually belonged to a pterosaur. Harry Govier Seeley himself later changed his opinion when he described the complete skeleton (specimen number BMNH R176) of a new pterosaur species he believed was closely related to O. cluniculus. He named this new species Ornithodesmus latidens in 1901. Although he now considered it a pterosaur, Seeley at the time still considered Ornithodesmus close to the origin of birds, and put forward the (now defunct) hypothesis that birds and pterosaurs shared a close common ancestry. For over a century following this, the pterosaur O. latidens was used as the standard example of Ornithodesmus, and the fragmentary type specimen was largely ignored. In 1913, Reginald Walter Hooley named a new family to distinguish Ornithodesmus from other large pterosaurs known at the time, Ornithodesmidae.

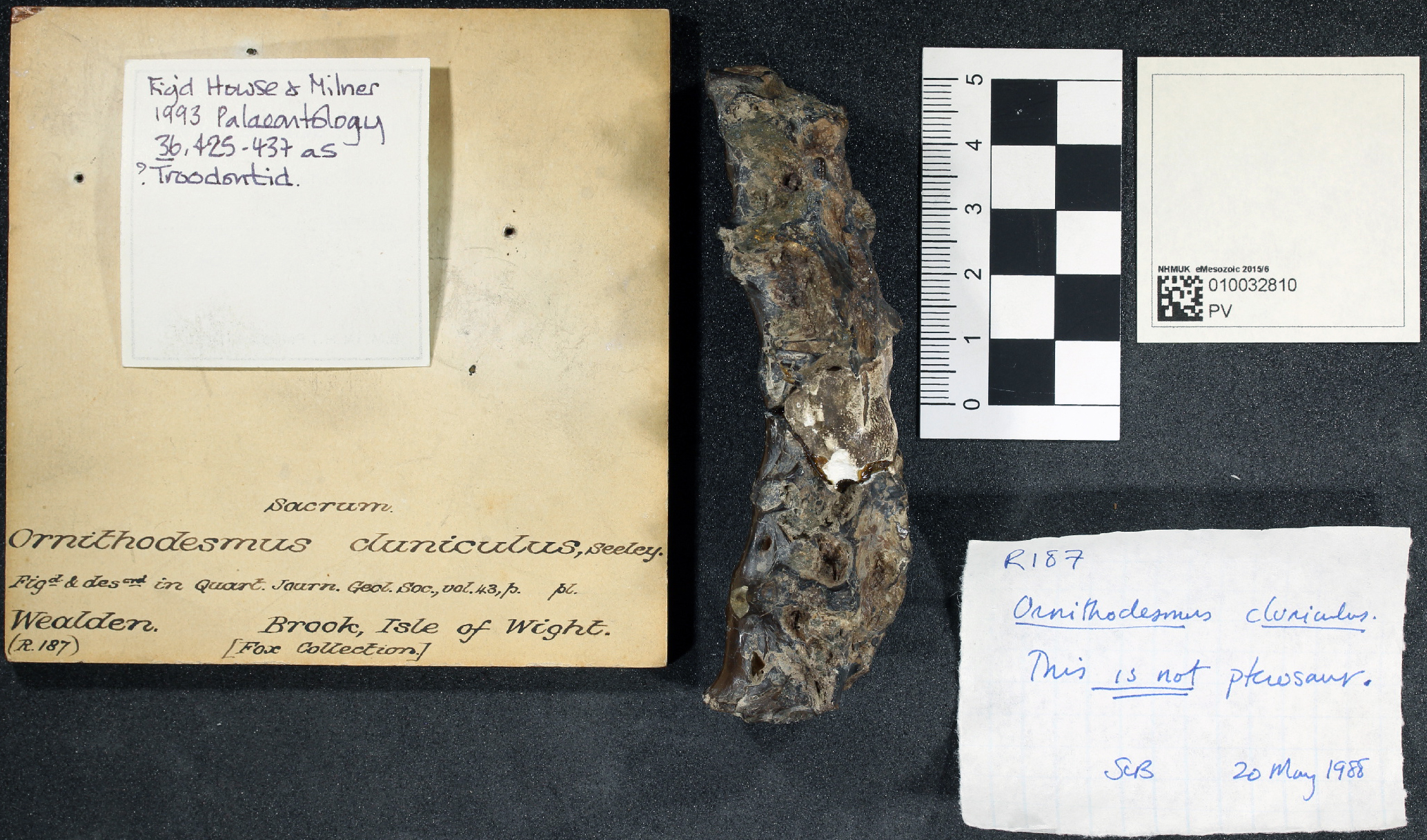
Modern photo of the holotype sacrum, with museum labels and a note written on 20 May 1988 confirming that Ornithodesmus cluniculus was not a pterosaur

In 1993, Stafford C. Howse and Andrew Milner re-examined the type specimen of O. cluniculus and determined that Seeley had incorrectly referred the pterosaur species to this genus. They identified O. cluniculus as a theropod dinosaur. Specifically, they suggested it was a troodontid, based on its similarity to the supposed troodontid specimen BMNH R4463, assigned to Saurornithoides minor at the time. However, later study by Peter Makovicky and Mark Norell showed this specimen to be a dromaeosaurid, specifically Saurornitholestes langstoni; because of this misidentification, they suggested Ornithodesmus was likely a dromaeosaurid as well. Darren Naish and colleagues in 2001 argued against a dromaeosaurid identity for Ornithodesmus, suggesting instead it was related to the ceratosaurs or coelophysids. However, Naish and Martill later changed their opinions, publishing a paper in 2007 that agreed with previous studies and classifying O. cluniculus as a dromaeosaurid. Naish favoured the dromaeosaurid hypothesis in a publication four years later. A 2019 analysis placed Ornithodesmus in family Unenlagiidae, otherwise considered a subgroup of Dromaeosauridae.

The more complete pterosaur specimens that had long been associated with the name Ornithodesmus were given a new name in 2001, Istiodactylus.

== Description ==
Based on its apparent identity as a dromaeosaur, Ornithodesmus likely had a total body length of either 1.5 m (4.9 ft) or 1.8 m (5.9 ft). Dromaeosaur teeth probably belonging to a velociraptorine are known from the same strata, which may or may not be referable to O. cluniculus. In 2007, it was argued that these teeth are too large to have belonged to Ornithodesmus; rather, they presumably came from a taxon closer in body size to the North American Utahraptor.

Since Ornithodesmus is only known from a sacrum, a mass of fused vertebrae over the hips, little can be said about its overall appearance. The most anterior vertebra, that at the front of the preserved column, is taller than the rest; the vertebrae become shallower the more posterior (rearward) they are. One of the autapomorphies, or distinctive/diagnostic traits, of O. cluniculus is that the sixth sacral vertebra was shorter than the preceding one. The neural spines of the vertebrae are fused and form a blade or lamina over the sacrum, which is slightly arched and measures 9.6 cm (3.8 in) in length. Structures at the bases of the neural spines, presumably fused zygapophyses, form a "platform" laterally (on either side); the same is observed in other dromaeosaurids. The first two vertebrae of the sacrum have deep hollow cavities (pneumatic foramina) on their centra (main bodies), which in life would have formed spaces for air sacs.

== Palaeoecology ==
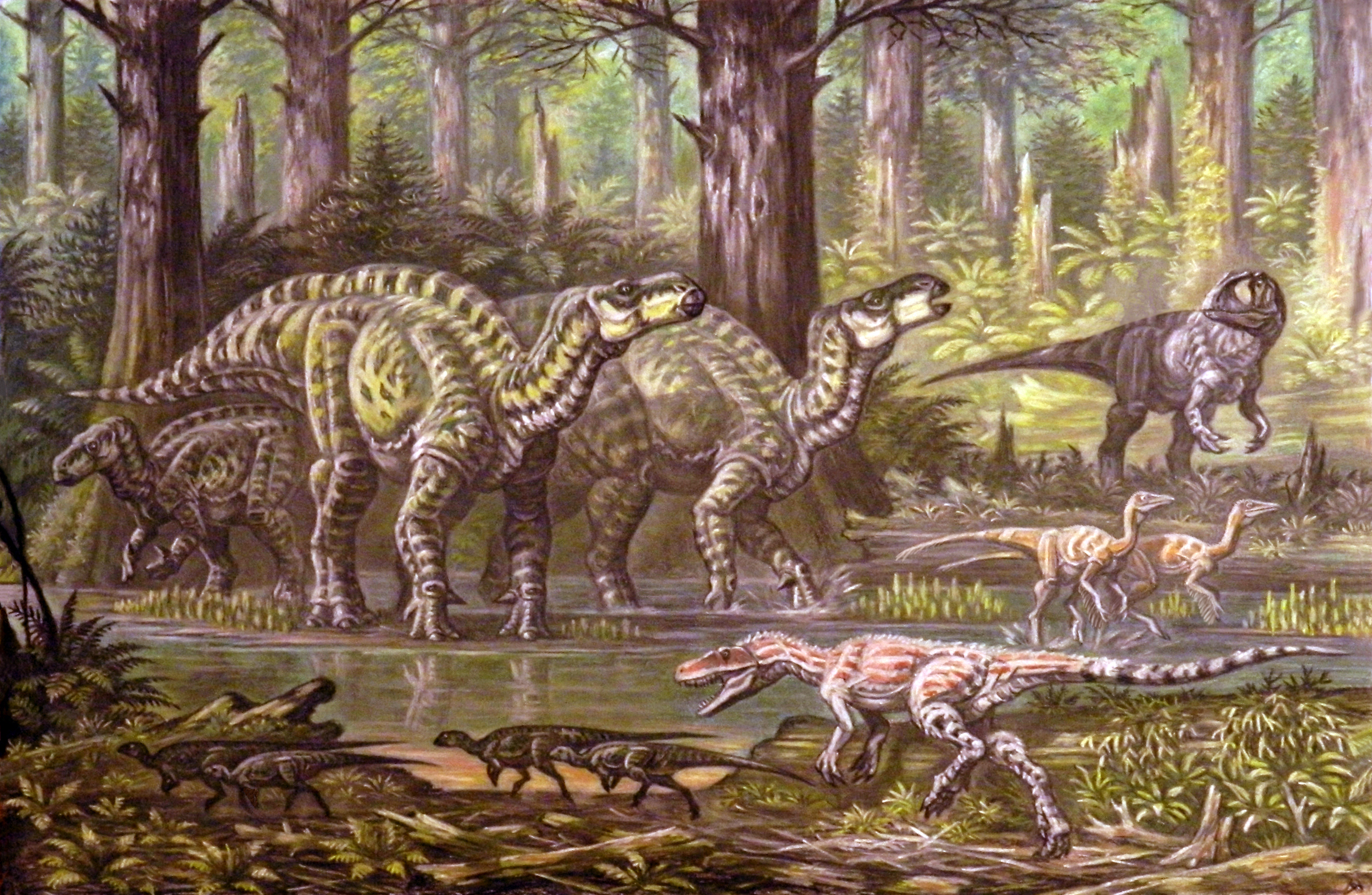
A selection of Wessex Formation dinosaurs. On the left is Iguanodon. In the foreground is a group of Hypsilophodon being pursued by an Eotyrannus. In the right background is a Neovenator. In the midground is a pair of basal ornithomimosaurs.

The holotype of Ornithodesmus heralds from the Wessex Formation. Sedimentological data suggests that the depositional environment of the Wessex Formation was a floodplain intersected by fluvial (river) and lacustrine (lake) deposits. Water levels likely varied throughout the year, due to there being more evaporation than precipitation, though precipitation was regardless quite high. The Wessex seems to have regularly experienced extreme storms and periodic flood events, resulting in debris flows which would have deposited dead organisms in ponds. Burned plant and insect material and fusain suggests that the environment experienced frequent wildfires, stifling for the most part the dense growth of gymnosperms. Much of the flora of the formed of low ground cover, consisting primarily of pteridophytes, with occasional stands of conifers, cycads and the tree fern Tempskya. Most vertebrate material from the Wessex Formation originates from plant debris beds, resulting from the aforementioned flooding events.

Aside from Thecocoelurus, the dinosaur fauna of the Isle of Wight includes the theropods Aristosuchus, Calamosaurus, Calamospondylus, Ceratosuchops, Eotyrannus, Neovenator, Riparovenator, Thecocoelurus, and Yaverlandia, the sauropods Chondrosteosaurus, Eucamerotus and Ornithopsis, the thyreophorans Polacanthus and Vectipelta, and the ornithopods Brighstoneus, Comptonatus, Hypsilophodon, Iguanodon, Mantellisaurus, Valdosaurus and Vectidromeus. The pterosaur fauna of the Wessex Formation consists of Coloborhynchus, Caulkicephalus, Istiodactylus, Vectidraco, and Wightia; multiple unnamed pterosaur taxa, including a ctenochasmatid, are also known. Neosuchian crocodyliforms include Bernissartia, Koumpiodontosuchus and Vectisuchus. Limited evidence exists of elasmosaurids and leptocleidid plesiosaurs. The mammal fauna of the Wessex Formation includes the multituberculate Eobataar and the spalacotheriid Yaverlestes. Albanerpetontid amphibians are represented by Wesserpeton. The fish fauna of the Wessex Formation, both bony and cartilaginous, is extensive, including hybodontiform and modern sharks (Selachii), pycnodontiforms, Lepidotes and Scheenstia. Invertebrates are represented by an assortment of non-biting midges, hymenopterans (wasps) including multiple parasitoid taxa, coleopterans (beetles), the avicularoid spider Cretamygale, and the ostracod Cypridea.

== See also ==
- Timeline of dromaeosaurid research
