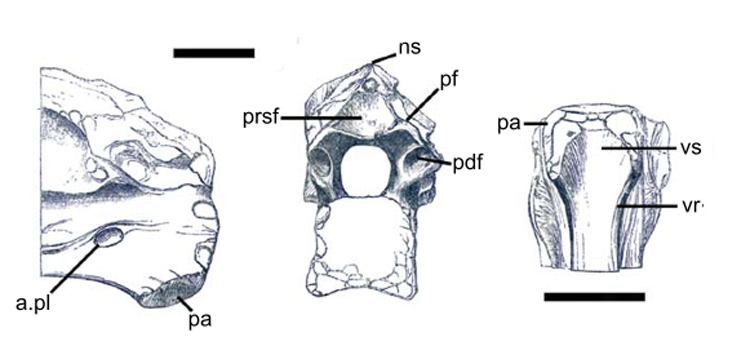
- Holotype vertebra

Scientific classification
- Kingdom: Animalia
- Phylum: Chordata
- Class: Reptilia
- Clade: Dinosauria
- Clade: Saurischia
- Clade: Theropoda
- Clade: Neotheropoda
- Genus: †Thecocoelurus; Huene, 1923
- Species: †T. daviesi

Binomial name
- †Thecocoelurus daviesi (Seeley, 1888)

Synonyms
- Thecospondylus daviesi Seeley, 1888; Coelurus daviesi Nopcsa, 1901; Valdoraptor? Olshevsky, 1991

= Thecocoelurus =

Thecocoelurus Temporal range: Barremian, 129–125 Ma

Extinct genus of dinosaurs

Thecocoelurus is a genus of theropod dinosaur from the early Cretaceous period of England. Its type specimen was discovered in strata from the Wessex Formation on the Isle of Wight by the Reverend William Fox, and after his death, it, alongside the rest of his collection, became the property of the British Museum of Natural History. The specimen was named in 1888 by Harry Govier Seeley, who assigned it to the genus Thecospondylus . In 1901, it was reassigned by Baron Franz Nopcsa to Coelurus. In 1923, the specimen was removed from either genus by Friedrich von Huene, who assigned it to a genus of its own. Thecocoelurus currently consists of one species, T. daviesi. The validity of the genus has been questioned, with a 2001 publication finding it to be a nomen dubium, although this treatment has not been maintained.

The phylogenetic placement of Thecocoelurus is uncertain. Originally it was believed to be a member of Coeluridae. Subsequently it has been suggested to be an ornithomimid, a more basal ornithomimosaur, an oviraptorosaur similar to caenagnathids, or a European representative of the therizinosaur lineage. In 2011 Darren Naish noted that many of the traits used to unite Thecocoelurus with oviraptosaurs were also found in a more basal theropod group, Noasauridae. Ergo, he suggested that it might have been some kind of ceratosaur.

== Discovery and naming ==
Thecocoelurus is known from the anterior (front) end of a cervical (neck) vertebra, about a third of its total length. The holotype specimen, NHMUK PV R181, was found in debris from a layer of the Wessex Formation, by the Rev. William Fox on the Isle of Wight. After his death, the Fox Collection was acquired by the British Museum of Natural History. William Davies was the first to notice the specimen and assumed a close affinity with Coelurus. It was described by Harry Govier Seeley in 1888. Seeley named the fossil Thecospondylus daviesi, referring it to a genus he had named earlier based on the incomplete internal cast of a sacrum. However, in 1901, Baron Franz Nopcsa renamed it Coelurus daviesi.

In 1923 Friedrich von Huene decided that NHMUK PV R181 should be removed from either Thecospondylus or Coelurus and given its own genus, Thecocoelurus. The generic name is a contraction of Thecospondylus and Coelurus, and translates to "sheathed hollow form".

== Description ==
As preserved, NHMUK PV R181 measures 39 mm (1.5 in) in length, though Darren Naish theorised that when complete, it may have measured somewhere between 70–90 mm (2.8–3.5 in). It is heavily worn and as preserved, lacks prezygapophyses (the superior, or upper, articular processes of the vertebrae). The centrum, the main body of the vertebra, is almost rectangular in cross-section, with a flat anterior (front) articular surface. Above the neural canal was a thin shelf of bone, which in life formed the margin of a deep pit, into which an interspinous ligament would have slotted. The parapophyses are long, located anteroventrally (at the front and towards the bottom). A low ridge runs horizontally along each lateral (outer) edge of the vertebral centrum. The ventral (bottom) part of the vertebra had an hourglass-like shape due to the presence of two ridges on the sulcus which merge anteriorly with the parapophyses.

== Classification ==
Von Huene originally assigned Thecocoelurus to the Coeluridae, but in 1926, speculated based on the large size and typical structure of the vertebra that it belonged instead to an ornithomimid. Though it has been since been typically identified as an indeterminate "coelurian" theropod, Thecocoelurus was reidentified by Darren Naish and colleagues in 2001 as a member of the Oviraptorosauria, a group of omnivorous maniraptoran theropods, which would make it the only oviraptorosaur fossil that has ever been found in Europe. Numerous detailed similarities are shared by the specimen and the cervical vertebrae of caenagnathid oviraptorosaurs. Naish and colleagues regarded Thecocoelurus to be a nomen dubium due to the fragmentary nature of its remains. In 2004, it was theorized by James Kirkland that Thecocoelurus might not be an oviraptorosaur, but a member of the therizinosaur lineage instead, closely related to Falcarius. Revisiting the remains in 2011, Darren Naish treated Thecocoelurus as valid. He noted that many of the traits he formerly used to suggest a caenagnathid identity were also found in noasaurids, members of the more basal theropod lineage Abelisauroidea, citing a paper by Federico L. Agnolin and Agustín G. Martinelli published four years prior. Therefore, he suggested that Thecocoelurus may have been a neoceratosaur, and perhaps a true abelisauroid. A 2014 paper supported the ornithomimosaur hypothesis, and suggested that Thecocoelurus may be a senior synonym of Valdoraptor. Informally, both Darren Naish and Mickey Mortimer have expressed doubt on the idea of Thecocoelurus being an ornithomimosaur, with the latter suggesting that it may instead represent a therizinosaur similar to Falcarius.

== Palaeoecology ==
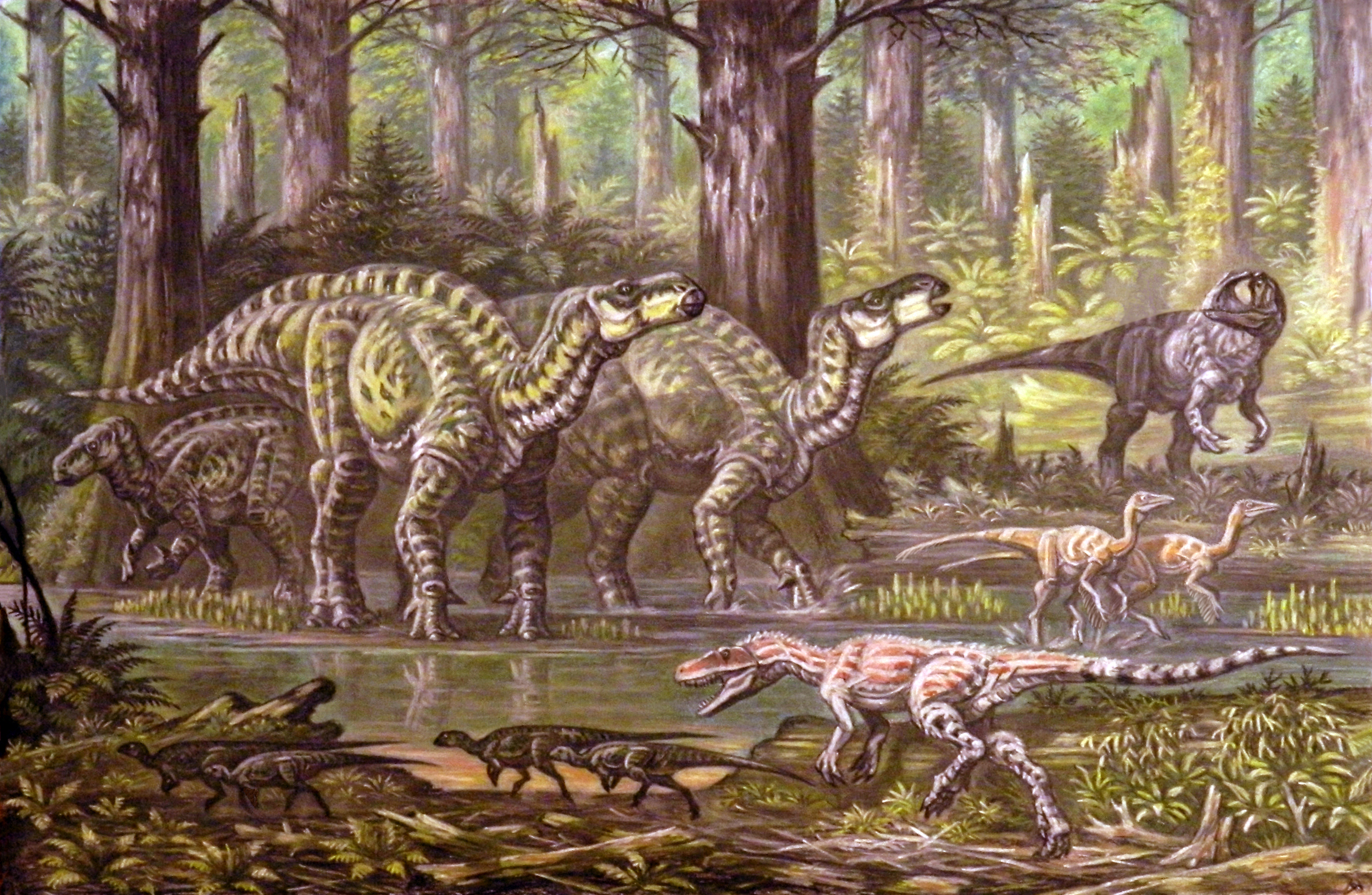
A selection of Wessex Formation dinosaurs. On the left is Iguanodon. In the foreground is a group of Hypsilophodon being pursued by an Eotyrannus. In the right background is a Neovenator. In the midground is a pair of basal ornithomimosaurs.

The holotype of Thecocoelurus heralds from the Wessex Formation. Sedimentological data suggests that the depositional environment of the Wessex Formation was a floodplain intersected by fluvial (river) and lacustrine (lake) deposits. Water levels likely varied throughout the year, due to there being more evaporation than precipitation, though precipitation was regardless quite high. The Wessex seems to have regularly experienced extreme storms and periodic flood events, resulting in debris flows which would have deposited dead organisms in ponds. Burned plant and insect material and fusain suggests that the environment experienced frequent wildfires, stifling for the most part the dense growth of gymnosperms. Much of the flora of the formed of low ground cover, consisting primarily of pteridophytes, with occasional stands of conifers, cycads and the tree fern Tempskya. Most vertebrate material from the Wessex Formation originates from plant debris beds, resulting from the aforementioned flooding events.

Aside from Thecocoelurus, the dinosaur fauna of the Isle of Wight includes the theropods Aristosuchus, Calamospondylus, Ceratosuchops, Eotyrannus, Neovenator, Ornithodesmus, Riparovenator and Yaverlandia, the sauropods Chondrosteosaurus, Eucamerotus and Ornithopsis, the thyreophorans Polacanthus and Vectipelta, and the ornithopods Brighstoneus, Comptonatus, Hypsilophodon, Iguanodon, Mantellisaurus, Valdosaurus and Vectidromeus. The pterosaur fauna of the Wessex Formation consists of Coloborhynchus, Caulkicephalus, Istiodactylus, Vectidraco, and Wightia; multiple unnamed pterosaur taxa, including a ctenochasmatid, are also known. Neosuchian crocodyliforms include Bernissartia, Koumpiodontosuchus and Vectisuchus. Limited evidence exists of elasmosaurids and leptocleidid plesiosaurs. The mammal fauna of the Wessex Formation includes the multituberculate Eobataar and the spalacotheriid Yaverlestes. Albanerpetontid amphibians are represented by Wesserpeton. The fish fauna of the Wessex Formation, both bony and cartilaginous, is extensive, including hybodontiform and modern sharks (Selachii), pycnodontiforms, Lepidotes and Scheenstia. Invertebrates are represented by an assortment of non-biting midges, hymenopterans (wasps) including multiple parasitoid taxa, coleopterans (beetles), the avicularoid spider Cretamygale, and the ostracod Cypridea.

== See also ==
- Timeline of ornithomimosaur research
