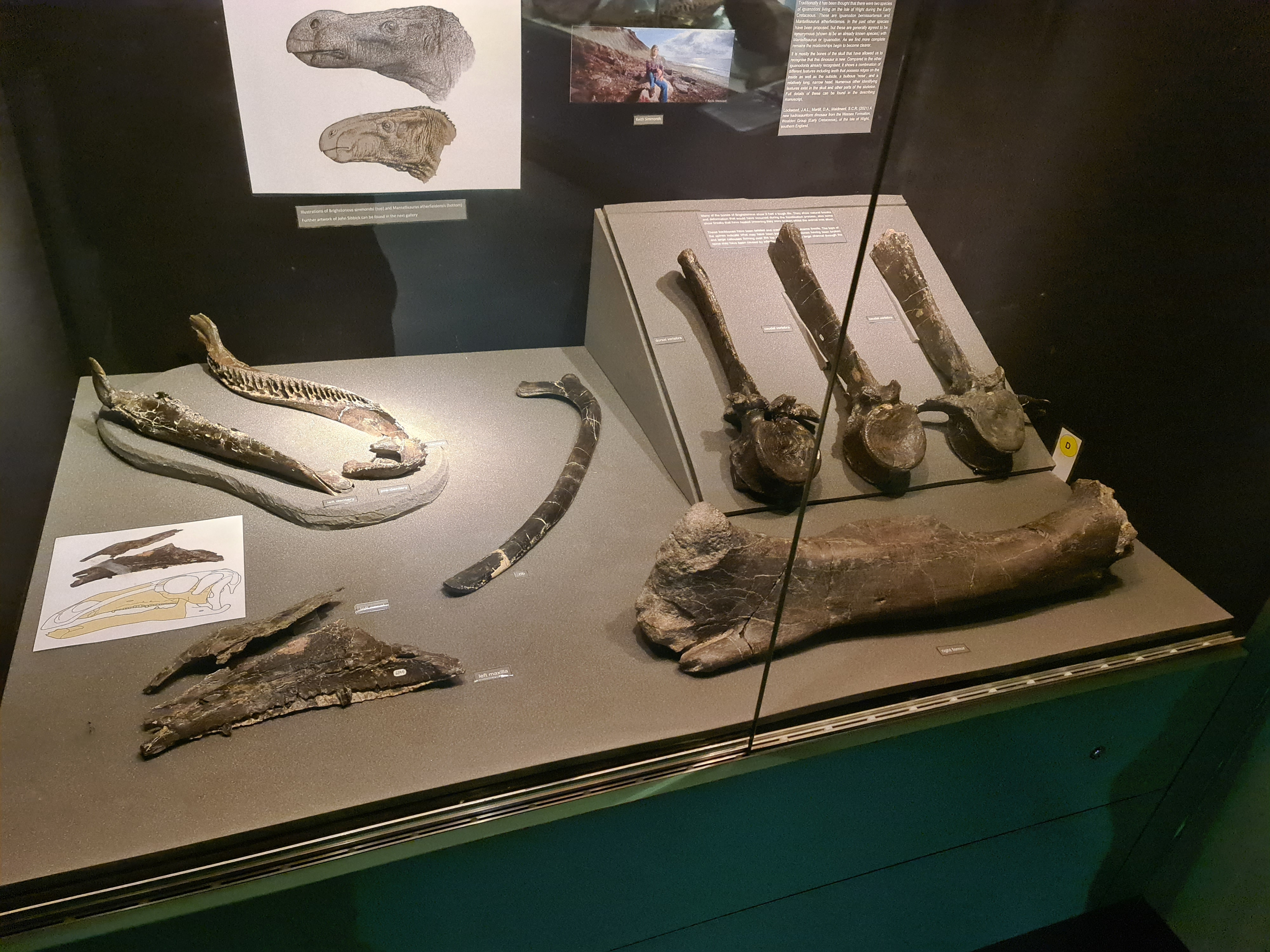
- Select material of Brighstoneus

Scientific classification
- Kingdom: Animalia
- Phylum: Chordata
- Class: Reptilia
- Clade: Dinosauria
- Clade: †Ornithischia
- Clade: †Ornithopoda
- Clade: †Hadrosauriformes
- Genus: †Brighstoneus; Lockwood et al., 2021
- Species: †B. simmondsi

Binomial name
- †Brighstoneus simmondsi Lockwood et al., 2021

= Brighstoneus =

Brighstoneus Temporal range: Early Cretaceous (Barremian), 126.5 Ma

Genus of hadrosauriform dinosaur

Brighstoneus (after Brighstone, a village on the Isle of Wight) is a genus of hadrosauriform dinosaur from the Early Cretaceous Wessex Formation of the Isle of Wight, England. The genus contains a single species, Brighstoneus simmondsi, known from a partial skeleton.

== History of discovery ==
The holotype specimen, MIWG 6344, was discovered along with the holotype of Neovenator during the summer of 1978, when a storm made part of the Grange Chine collapse. Rocks containing fossils fell to the beach of Brighstone Bay on the southwestern coast of the Isle of Wight. The rocks were part of the plant debris bed L9 within the variegated clays and marls of the Wessex Formation dating from the Barremian stage of the Early Cretaceous, about 125 million years ago. They were first collected by the Henwood family and shortly afterwards by geology student David Richards. Richards sent the remains to the Museum of Isle of Wight Geology and the Natural History Museum, London. In the latter institution paleontologist Alan Jack Charig determined that the bones belonged to two kinds of animal: Iguanodon and what would later become Neovenator. The "Iguanodon", later referred to Mantellisaurus, at first generated the most interest and in the early 1980s a team was sent by the NHM to secure more of its bones. Amateur paleontologists Keith and Jenny Simmonds assisted in collecting remains.

Brighstoneus was found to be distinct from Mantellisaurus by 2019 when being studied by the retired physician Jeremy Lockwood cataloguing all iguanodontian fossils from Wight for his PhD study at the University of Portsmouth. The new taxon was named and described as the type species Brighstoneus simmondsi by Jeremy Lockwood, David Martill and Susannah Maidment in 2021. The generic name refers to Brighstone village, as it was the residence of nineteenth-century palaeontologist Rev. William Fox. The specific name honours Keith Simmonds as discoverer.

The holotype was discovered from strata of the Wessex Formation dating from the early Barremian, at least 125 million years old. Mantellisaurus is about four million years younger. The holotype consists of a partial skeleton with skull and lower jaws. It contains the right premaxilla, both maxillae, both jugal bones, the left palpebral, the predentary, both dentaries, eight back vertebrae, the sacrum, six tail vertebrae, fourteen ribs, both ilia, a possible prepubic process of the pubic bone, the right ischium and the right thighbone. The bones were not articulated but found intermingled with the Neovenator bones over a surface of six by five metres. They had been damaged by beetle larvae prior to fossilisation. Due to the confused discovery process, two vertebrae are in private possession and were not described in 2021.

== Description ==
In their paper describing Brighstoneus, Lockwood and colleagues did not provide any estimates of dimensions or body mass, though noted that it was large in size. In 2024, Gregory S. Paul estimated that Brighstoneus was probably 6 m (20 ft) in length, and provided a body mass estimate of about 1 t (2,200 lb).

=== Skull and dentition ===
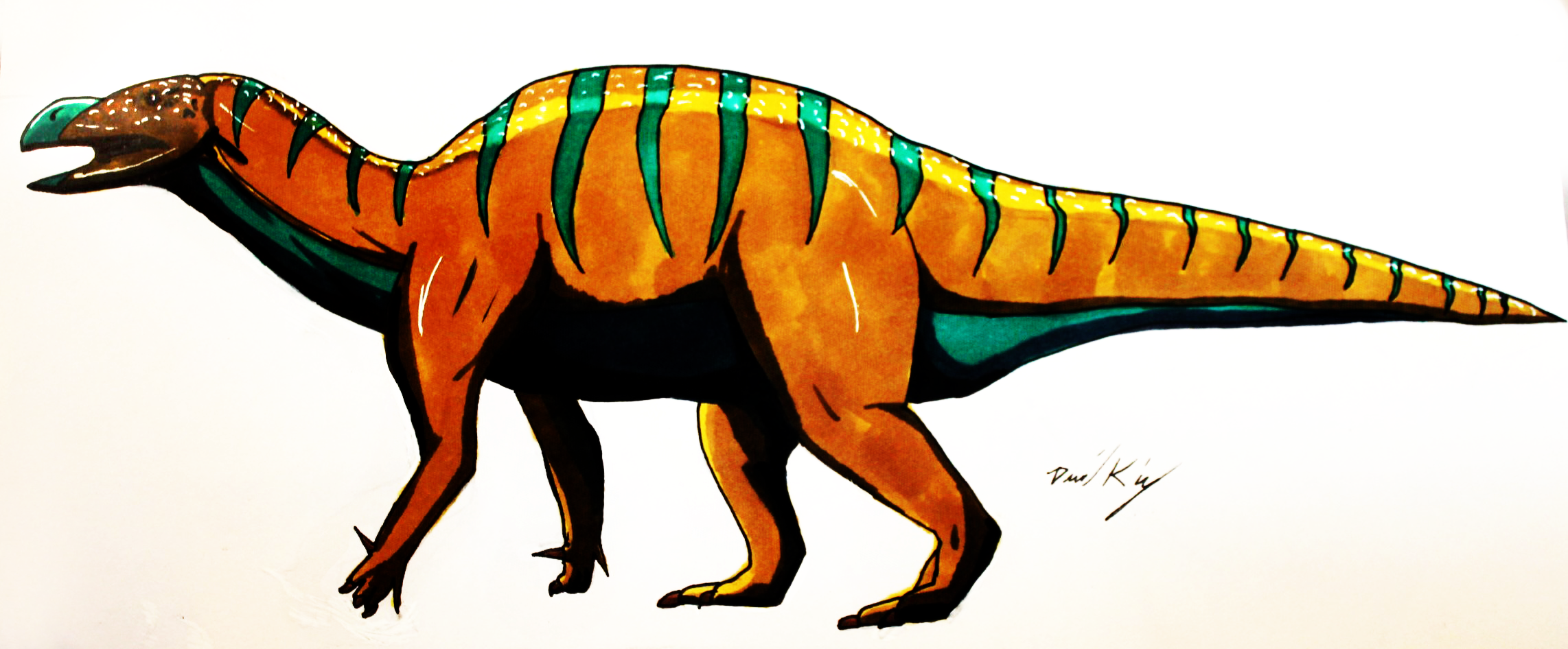
Speculative life restoration

The skull of Brighstoneus differs from many other iguanodontians in that the nasal bone past the naris (the opening for the nostril and nasal chambers) bulged dorsally (upwards), forming a so-called nasal bulla. Similar structures are found in other hadrosauriforms (such as Altirhinus and the hadrosaur Gryposaurus), though the morphology seen in Brighstoneus, wherein the dorsal surface of the nasal would be somewhat "S"-shaped when viewed from the side, was almost entirely unique. The taxon with the most similar condition is the Australian rhabdodont Muttaburrasaurus, although, in that genus, the lateral (side) parts of the nasal bullae appear to have been more concave. The maxilla is robust, but is thinner when viewed dorsally or ventrally (from below) than in Mantellisaurus. When viewed from the side, it is triangular, expanding anteroposteriorly (from front to back). The jugal bones were straighter and narrower (from a dorsal view) than in Mantellisaurus. Roughly 60% of the total length of the jugal is taken up by the maxillary process, the structure to which the maxilla would have attached; in most hadrosauriforms, this number is between 40–54%, save for the closely related Ouranosaurus, in which it was 62%. The predentary bone, a structure found exclusively in ornithischians that contributed to the lower beak, is exceptionally well preserved in the holotype of Brighstoneus. It bore a bilobed, heart-shaped process on its ventral (bottom) aspect. On the dorsal surface were a series of large denticles. The dentaries, the tooth-bearing bones of the mandibles, were morphologically quite similar to those of other hadrosauriforms.

The maxillary teeth of Brighstoneus are poorly known, and have been mostly lost. Based on a near-complete tooth crown, they had more enamel on their labial (outer) side than they did on their lingual (inner) side. The labial surface of the tooth crown had a ridge, similar to that seen in Altirhinus and Bayannurosaurus. The dentary row contains 28 alveoli (tooth sockets), with a small pit on the right dentary which may represent another. Among hadrosauriforms like Brighstoneus, taxa which adopted a system where one active and one replacement crown were found in the same alveolus (in contrast to more derived, later taxa), this is the highest number of alveoli known.

=== Postcranial skeleton ===
Eight dorsal (back) vertebrae are preserved in the holotype of Brighstoneus, as are six sacral vertebrae (those belonging to the sacrum, a mass of fused bones over the hips) and six caudal (tail) vertebrae. A relatively high ridge ran along much of Brighstoneus' vertebral column, reaching its apex over the base of the tail, where some neural spines were over 370% the height of the vertebral centra (the main bodies of the vertebrae).

== Classification ==
In 2021, Jeremy Lockwood and colleagues performed a series of phylogenetic analyses which placed Brighstoneus in the Iguanodontia. In most analyses, it was found to be more basal in the Hadrosauriformes, in a polytomy with related forms including the British Barilium, Hypselospinus, Iguanodon and Mantellisaurus. In an analysis excluding two new characters describing the nasal and ilium, resolution within Hadrosauriformes could be found, with Brightstoneus recovered outside of the Hadrosauriformes as a sister species of Ouranosaurus as seen below.

- Styracosterna
  - Uteodon
  - - Dakotadon
    - - Hippodraco
      - - Iguanacolossus
        - - Proa
          - - Lanzhousaurus
            - - Hypselospinus
              - - Bayannurosaurus
                - - - Ouranosaurus
                    - Brighstoneus
                  - Hadrosauriformes
                    - - Mantellisaurus
                      - - Barilium
                        - Iguanodon
                    - Hadrosauroidea

In their 2024 description of Comptonatus, another Wessex Formation iguanodont, Lockwood and colleagues published an updated version of this phylogenetic matrix, recovering Brighstoneus as the earliest-diverging member of Hadrosauroidea within Hadrosauriformes, rather than as the sister to Ouranosaurus outside of this clade. In their 2025 study describing Istiorachis, yet another Wessex iguanodont, Lockwood et al. recovered comparable results in their better-resolved trees.

Using a novel phylogenetic matrix for their description of the Portuguese hadrosauroid Cariocecus bocagei, Bertozzo et al. (2025) recovered this taxon as the sister taxon to a clade formed by Comptonatus and Brighstoneus. These taxa were placed within the Hadrosauroidea, diverging after the Iguanodontidae. A study by Huang and colleagues (2026) using an updated version of this matrix recovered a comparable clade. The results of the former study are displayed in the cladogram below:

- Hadrosauriformes
  - Iguanodontidae
    - Iguanodon bernissartensis
    - Mantellisaurus atherfieldensis
  - Hadrosauroidea
    - - Ouranosaurus nigeriensis
      - Morelladon beltrani
    - - - Cariocecus bocagei
        - - Brighstoneus simmondsi
          - Comptonatus chasei
      - - Bolong yixianensis
        - - Altirhinus kurzanovi
          - - Jinzhousaurus yangi
            - - Equijubus normani
              - - - Xuwulong yueluni
                  - Jintasaurus meniscus
                - - Batyrosaurus rozhdestvenskyi
                  - - Probactrosaurus gobiensis
                    - Hadrosauromorpha
                      ⊞ ⇒
                      - Gongpoquansaurus mazongshanensis
                      - - Eolambia caroljonesa
                        - - - Protohadros byrdi
                            - Jeyawati rugoculus
                          - - Plesiohadros
                            - - - Gilmoreosaurus mongoliensis
                                - Bactrosaurus johnsoni
                              - - Levnesovia transoxiana
                                - - Eotrachodon orientalis
                                  - Telmatosaurus transsylvanicus
                                  - Tanius sinensis
                                  - Tethyshadros insularis
                                  - - - Tethyshadros insularis
                                      - Huehuecanauhtlus tiquichensis
                                    - - Hadrosauridae
                      ⊟

== Paleoenvironment ==
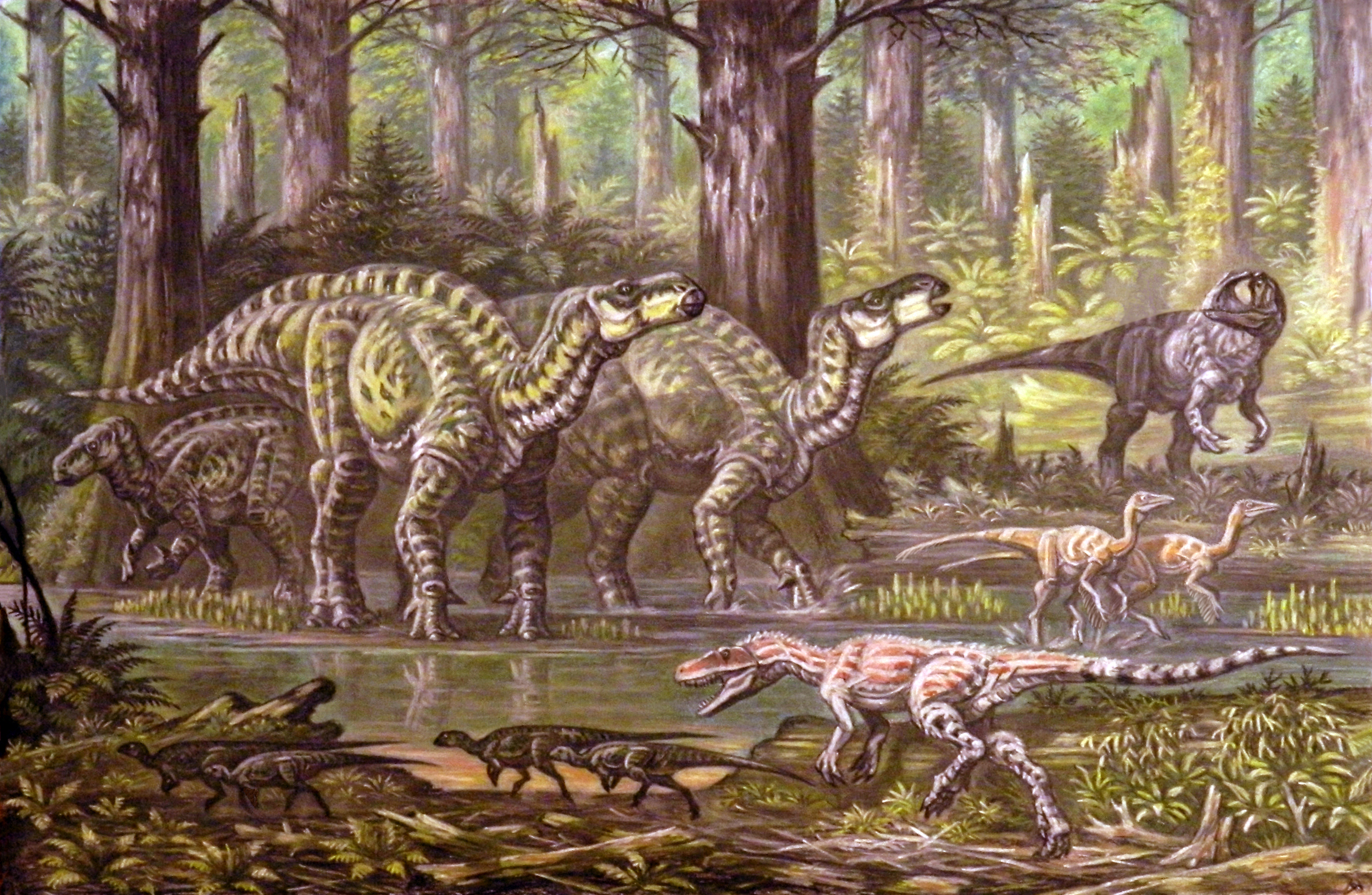
A selection of Wessex Formation dinosaurs. On the left is Iguanodon. In the foreground is a group of Hypsilophodon being pursued by an Eotyrannus. In the right background is a Neovenator. In the midground is a pair of basal ornithomimosaurs.

The holotype of Brighstoneus was collected from strata belonging to the Wessex Formation, more specifically from Barremian deposits. Sedimentological data suggests that the depositional environment of the Wessex Formation was a floodplain intersected by fluvial (river) and lacustrine (lake) deposits. Water levels likely varied throughout the year, due to there being more evaporation than precipitation, though precipitation was regardless quite high. The Wessex seems to have regularly experienced extreme storms and periodic flood events, resulting in debris flows which would have deposited dead organisms in ponds. Burned plant and insect material and fusain suggests that the environment experienced frequent wildfires, stifling for the most part the dense growth of gymnosperms. Much of the flora of the formed of low ground cover, consisting primarily of pteridophytes, with occasional stands of conifers, cycads and the tree fern Tempskya. Most vertebrate material from the Wessex Formation originates from plant debris beds, resulting from the aforementioned flooding events.

Aside from Neovenator, the dinosaur fauna of the Isle of Wight include the theropods Aristosuchus, Calamospondylus, Ceratosuchops, Eotyrannus, Ornithodesmus, Riparovenator and Thecocoelurus, the sauropods Chondrosteosaurus, Eucamerotus and Ornithopsis, the thyreophorans Polacanthus and Vectipelta, and the ornithopods Comptonatus, Hypsilophodon, Iguanodon, Istiorachis, Mantellisaurus, Valdosaurus and Vectidromeus. The pterosaur fauna of the Wessex Formation consists of Coloborhynchus, Caulkicephalus, Istiodactylus, Vectidraco, and Wightia; multiple unnamed pterosaur taxa, including a ctenochasmatid, are also known. Neosuchian crocodyliforms include Bernissartia, Koumpiodontosuchus and Vectisuchus. Limited evidence exists of elasmosaurids and leptocleidid plesiosaurs. The mammal fauna of the Wessex Formation includes the multituberculate Eobataar and the spalacotheriid Yaverlestes. Albanerpetontid amphibians are represented by Wesserpeton. The fish fauna of the Wessex Formation, both bony and cartilaginous, is extensive, including hybodontiform and modern sharks (Selachii), pycnodontiforms, Lepidotes and Scheenstia. Invertebrates are represented by an assortment of non-biting midges, hymenopterans (wasps) including multiple parasitoid taxa, coleopterans (beetles), the avicularoid spider Cretamygale, and the ostracod Cypridea.
