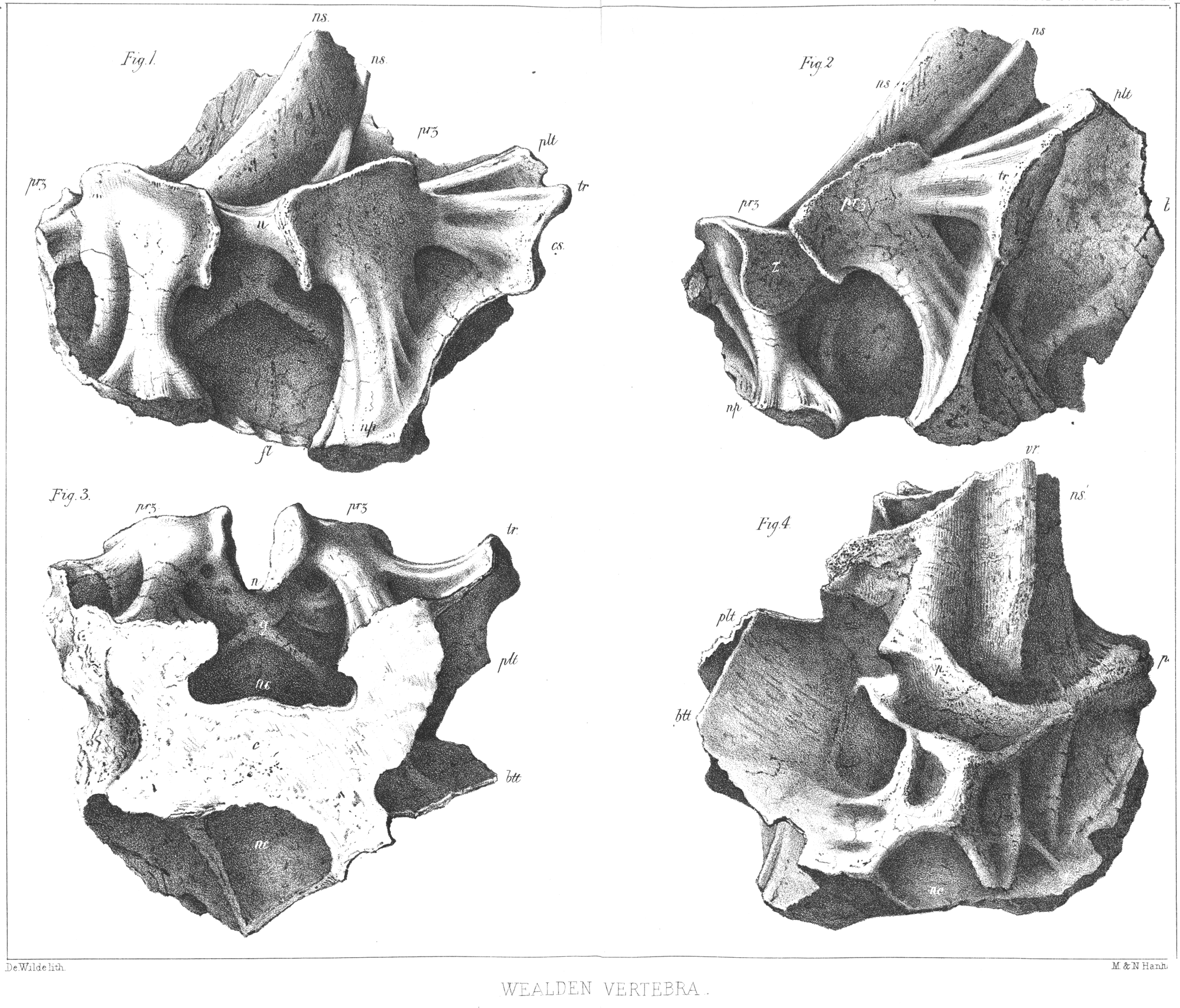
- Holotype vertebral arch in various views as figured by John Hulke in 1870

Scientific classification
- Kingdom: Animalia
- Phylum: Chordata
- Class: Reptilia
- Clade: Dinosauria
- Clade: Saurischia
- Clade: †Sauropodomorpha
- Clade: †Sauropoda
- Clade: †Eusauropoda
- Clade: †Macronaria
- Clade: †Titanosauriformes
- Genus: †Eucamerotus; Hulke, 1872
- Species: †E. foxi

Binomial name
- †Eucamerotus foxi Blows, 1995

= Eucamerotus =

Eucamerotus Temporal range: Early Cretaceous, Barremian

Extinct genus of dinosaurs

Eucamerotus (meaning "well-chambered", in reference to the hollows of the vertebrae) is an extinct genus of sauropod dinosaur from the Early Cretaceous (Barremian) Wessex Formation (Wealden) of the Isle of Wight, England. The type specimen, part of a vertebra (one of the bones of the spine), was discovered in the autumn of 1869 by John Hulke. After confirming its point of origin with the Rev. William Fox, Hulke presented his find to the Geological Society of London in 1870. Two years later, he assigned to it the name Eucamerotus, though did not provide a species name. Eucamerotus was subsequently treated as a junior synonym of two existing sauropods, Pelorosaurus and Ornithopsis. In 1995, William T. Blows gave a species name, creating the combination Eucamerotus foxi. While the validity of the genus has continued to be questioned, a 2011 publication found it to be a valid genus of titanosauriform. Comparisons with the fossils of other macronarians suggests it may have reached up to 15 m (49 ft) in length.

== History and taxonomy ==
The holotype of Eucamerotus (NHMUK R.2522), a neural arch, was collected by geologist John Hulke in the autumn of 1869, near Brighstone Bay on the Isle of Wight, in "a large block of stone". He brought it to the attention of the Rev. William Fox, who pinpointed its origin to "a bed which occurs near the top of the high cliff between Brooke and Chilton". (Note: The Wessex Formation.) The following year, Hulke presented the vertebra to the Geological Society of London, providing a description of it and measurements. Two years later, he assigned a name to the specimen, Eucamerotus, and suggested that the lectotype of Ornithopsis hulkei might be assignable to it. The genus name Eucamerotus derives from the Ancient Greek eu- ("well") and kamerotus ("chambered"). In naming Eucamerotus, Hulke neglected to designate a type species.

In 1879, Hulke assigned NHMUK R.2522 to Ornithopsis, based on the discovery of additional vertebrae from the Isle of Wight, rendering it a junior synonym. Later authors continued to regard Eucamerotus as a synonym, though of a different Wealden sauropod genus, Pelorosaurus.

Eucamerotus as a valid genus was resurrected in 1995 by William T. Blows. He designated a type species, E. foxi, named after Rev. William Fox. After his initial description, Hulke had designated several vertebrae to Ornithopsis; all of these were reassigned to Eucamerotus to serve as paratypes. Additionally, Blows assigned a partial skeleton, MIWG-BP001 (the "Barnes High sauropod") to E. foxi. The inclusion of this specimen proved controversial, as it is privately owned, and was treated as a distinct taxon by Paul Upchurch, Philip D. Mannion, and Paul M. Barrett in a 2011 publication.

=== Validity ===
Since its resurrection by Blows, the validity of Eucamerotus has been questioned. Darren Naish and David Martill, in 2001, suggested that it should be treated as a nomen dubium, though suggested a position within Brachiosauridae, an idea which had been suggested in prior studies. Writing in 2004, Upchurch, Barrett, and Peter Dodson similarly considered it dubious. A more recent review of Titanosauria, the 2011 publication by Upchurch, Mannion, and Barrett, found E. foxi to be a valid taxon, based on the establishment of new diagnostic features. Rather than assigning it to a specific family, they opted to place E. foxi in a basal position within Titanosauriformes.

== Description ==
=== Size ===
The vertebrae assigned to Eucamerotus foxi each measured around 20 cm (7.9 in) in length. Comparisons with other titanosaurs indicate that E. foxi would have been about 15 m (49 ft) in length, and would thus have been mid-sized by sauropod standards; this is further supported if the Barnes High sauropod is treated as part of the same taxon, though it likely is not.

=== Anatomy ===
While historically regarded as dubious due to a lack of autapomorphic (distinguishing) traits, the 2011 work by Upchurch, Mannion, and Barrett found that Eucamerotus had two potential candidates. One relates to pleurocoels (hollows in the bone which would have lightened their overall weight): the pleurocoels of E. foxi each bear a small, elongated fossa, running parallel to their posterior (rear) margins. The other is that the prezygapophyses, upward-facing articular processes on the anterior (front) portion of a vertebra, are connected to the parapophyses (the ventral, or bottom, processes of a vertebra), by two ridges separated by a fossa. The transverse processes project laterally (outward) and superiorly (upwards) at an angle steeper than that observed in Brachiosaurus and Giraffatitan. The posterior surface of each neural spine often bears a lamina along its midline, similar to that of diplodocids and titanosaurs but less well-developed.

== Palaeoecology ==
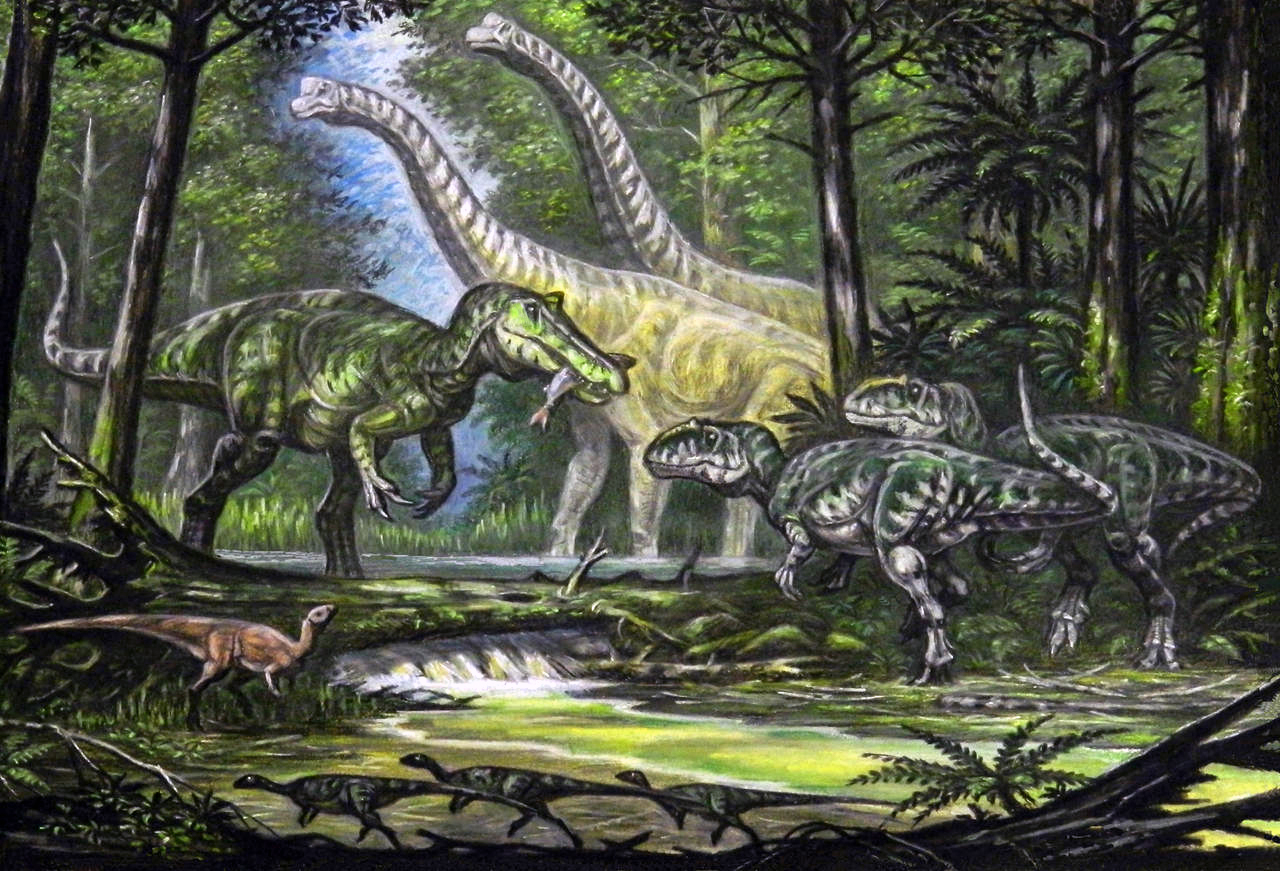
Life restoration of Eucamerotus (background) with contemporary dinosaurs: Baryonyx (left), two Neovenator (right), Valdosaurus (midground), and Hypsilophodon (foreground).

The known specimens of Eucamerotus originate from the Wessex Formation. Sedimentological data suggests that the depositional environment of the Wessex Formation was a floodplain intersected by fluvial (river) and lacustrine (lake) deposits. Water levels likely varied throughout the year, due to there being more evaporation than precipitation, though precipitation was regardless quite high. The Wessex seems to have regularly experienced extreme storms and periodic flood events, resulting in debris flows which would have deposited dead organisms in ponds. Burned plant and insect material and fusain suggests that the environment experienced frequent wildfires, stifling for the most part the dense growth of gymnosperms. Much of the flora of the formed of low ground cover, consisting primarily of pteridophytes, with occasional stands of conifers, cycads and the tree fern Tempskya. Most vertebrate material from the Wessex Formation originates from plant debris beds, resulting from the aforementioned flooding events.

Aside from Thecocoelurus, the dinosaur fauna of the Isle of Wight includes the theropods Aristosuchus, Calamospondylus, Ceratosuchops, Eotyrannus, Invictibellatrix, Neovenator, Ornithodesmus, Riparovenator and Yaverlandia, the sauropods Chondrosteosaurus and Ornithopsis, the thyreophorans Polacanthus and Vectipelta, and the ornithopods Brighstoneus, Comptonatus, Hypsilophodon, Iguanodon, Mantellisaurus, Valdosaurus and Vectidromeus. The pterosaur fauna of the Wessex Formation consists of Coloborhynchus, Caulkicephalus, Istiodactylus, Vectidraco, and Wightia; multiple unnamed pterosaur taxa, including a ctenochasmatid, are also known. Neosuchian crocodyliforms include Bernissartia, Koumpiodontosuchus and Vectisuchus. Limited evidence exists of elasmosaurids and leptocleidid plesiosaurs. The mammal fauna of the Wessex Formation includes the multituberculate Eobataar and the spalacotheriid Yaverlestes. Albanerpetontid amphibians are represented by Wesserpeton. The fish fauna of the Wessex Formation, both bony and cartilaginous, is extensive, including hybodontiform and modern sharks (Selachii), pycnodontiforms, Lepidotes and Scheenstia. Invertebrates are represented by an assortment of non-biting midges, hymenopterans (wasps) including multiple parasitoid taxa, coleopterans (beetles), the avicularoid spider Cretamygale, and the ostracod Cypridea.
