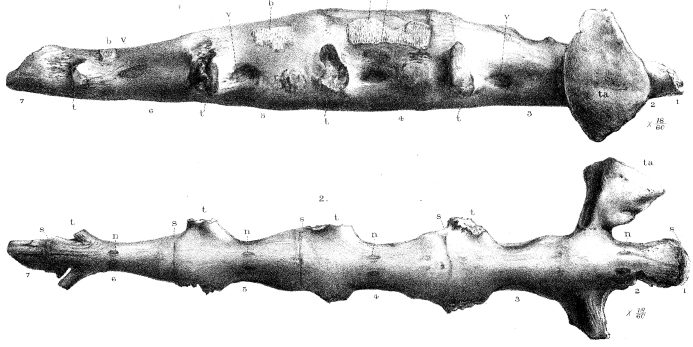
- Thecospondylus neural canal cast

Scientific classification
- Kingdom: Animalia
- Phylum: Chordata
- Class: Reptilia
- Clade: Dinosauria
- Genus: †Thecospondylus; Seeley, 1882
- Species: †T. horneri

Binomial name
- †Thecospondylus horneri Seeley, 1882

= Thecospondylus =

Thecospondylus Temporal range: Early Cretaceous, ~140–129 Ma Valanginian-Hauterivian

Extinct genus of dinosaurs

Thecospondylus (THEEK-o-SPON-di-lus, "sheath vertebra") is a dubious genus of dinosaur from the Early Cretaceous of England. Scientists are unsure as to whether Thecospondylus was a saurischian or an ornithischian.

== History ==
Dr. A.C. Horner, an amateur geologist living at Tonbridge, in the nineteenth century acquired a fossil found in the quarry of Southborough. He sent it to paleontologist Harry Govier Seeley who in 1882 described and named it as the type species Thecospondylus horneri. The genus name is derived from Greek theke meaning 'sheath' and spondylos meaning 'vertebra', a reference to the "extremely thin" bone forming the vertebrae. The specific name honours Horner.

The holotype, BMNH R.291, was found in a layer of the Hastings Sand, sandstone dating from the Valanginian - Hauterivian. It consist of an elongated natural internal cast or endocast of the neural canal of the sacrum, about sixty centimetres long. It shows the divisions of at least five and probably seven sacral vertebrae. On three of them the cancellous bone is still present to which the generic name is referring. It is the only known fossil that can be definitely assigned to this genus.

A second species, T. daviesi, was added by Seeley in 1888, but later given its own genus, Thecocoelurus. In 1926 Friedrich von Huene renamed T. horneri to Thecocoelurus horneri, but this has not been commonly accepted, because Thecospondylus would have priority.

== Classification ==
Based on such meagre material, the affinities of T. horneri have been hard to determine. Seeley himself merely assigned it to Dinosauria. Richard Lydekker in 1888 referred it to the Sauropoda. Von Huene however in 1909 considered it to be a member of the theropod family Coeluridae. Recent authors conclude it is a nomen dubium, of which it is not even certain whether it is a saurischian or an ornithischian.
