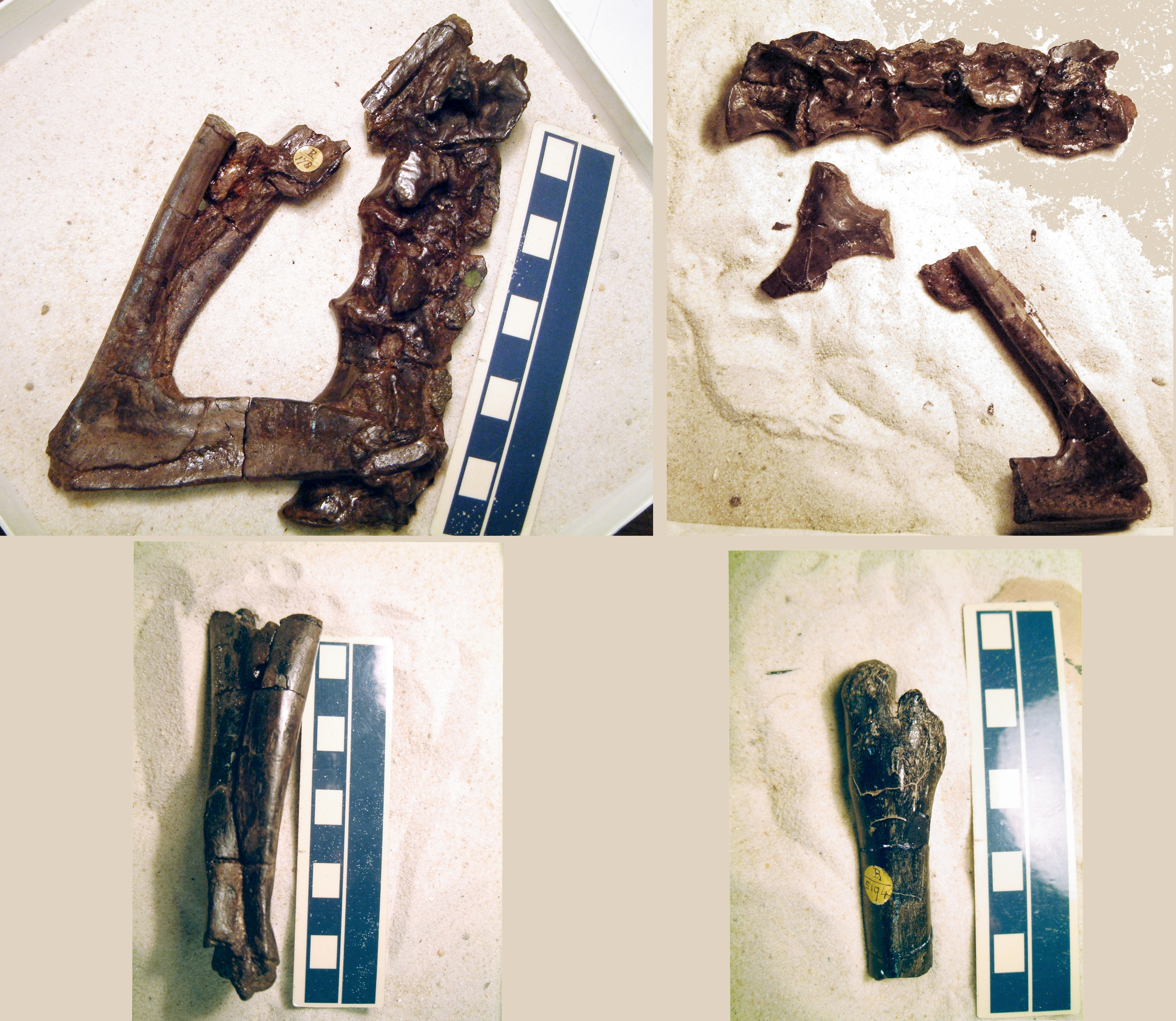
- Holotype fossils

Scientific classification
- Kingdom: Animalia
- Phylum: Chordata
- Class: Reptilia
- Clade: Dinosauria
- Clade: Saurischia
- Clade: Theropoda
- Family: †Compsognathidae
- Genus: †Aristosuchus; Seeley, 1887
- Species: †A. pusillus

Binomial name
- †Aristosuchus pusillus (Owen, 1876)

Synonyms
- Poekilopleuron pusillus Owen, 1876

= Aristosuchus =

Aristosuchus Temporal range: Barremian ~130–123 Ma

Extinct genus of dinosaurs

Aristosuchus (from the Ancient Greek ἄριστος, meaning "bravest, best, noblest", and σουχος, the Ancient Greek corruption of the name of the Egyptian crocodile-headed god Sobek) is a genus of small coelurosaurian dinosaur that lived in the Early Cretaceous period (Barremian stage, sometime between 130 and 123 million years ago) of what is now England, UK. The type and only species is Aristosuchus pusillus, originally referred to the carnosaurian genus Poekilopleuron.

== Discovery ==
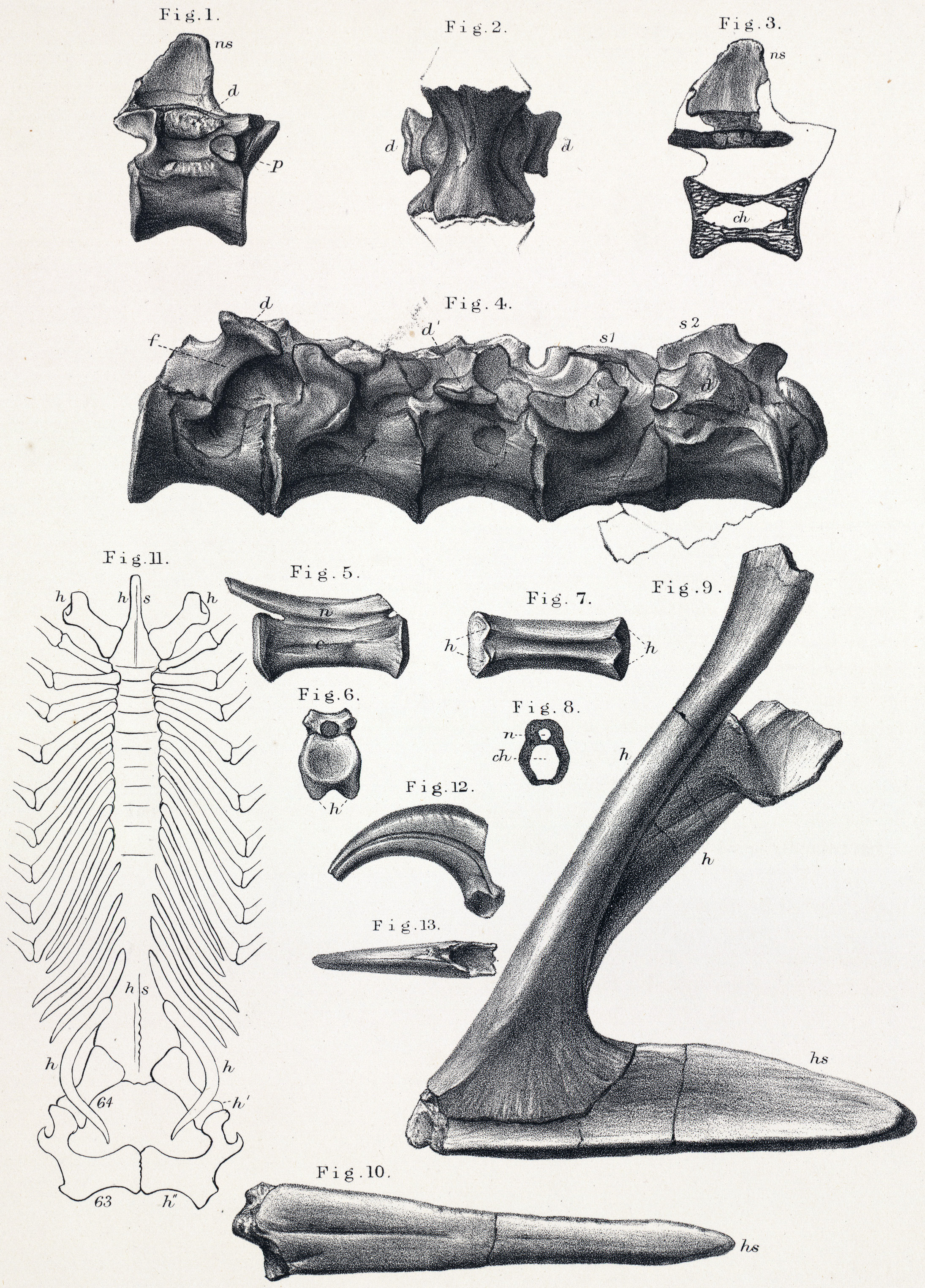
Holotype elements as figured by Owen

The specimen (BMNH R178) now referred to as Aristosuchus pusillus were discovered by Reverend William D. Fox in deposits from the Isle of Wight, specifically from the Wessex Formation (part of the south-western portion of the Wealden Group). BMNH R178 was described in 1876 by Richard Owen, who regarded it as a new species of Poekilopleuron. Poekilopleuron had been named forty years prior by Jacques Amand Eudes-Deslongchamps. Owen, disapproving of how Eudes-Deslongchamps had chosen to spell the genus name, deliberately named his taxon Poikilopleuron pusillus. The species name he gave it, pusillus, originates from the Latin for "very small". Poekilopleuron was at the time believed to be a relative of crocodiles, and Owen saw his taxon in the same way. In 1887, the fossils were revisited by Harry Govier Seeley. Recognising that it differed from Poekilopleuron in key diagnostic features, Seeley opted to give Owen's taxon a new genus name, Aristosuchus. This replacement name comes from the Ancient Greek aristos ("best, superior") and soukhos ("crocodile"). While Seeley loosely supported the idea of Aristosuchus being related to crocodilians, he initially believed that it occupied a taxonomic position between crocodiles and dinosaurs. In his 1901 work Dragons of the Air, Seeley proposed a model of archosaur relationships where "Aristosuchia", a taxon erected previously by Edward Drinker Cope, was separate from saurischians and ornithischians.

== Description ==
Aristosuchus was a bipedal, meat-eating (carnivorous) theropod dinosaur. It is thought to have been about 2 metres (6.6 ft) in length, and is estimated to have weighed about 30 kilograms (66 lb). According to Gregory S. Paul, its weight was estimated at 7 kilograms (15 lb).

The femur of Aristosuchus has a wing-like anterior (front) trochanter and a markedly reduced fourth trochanter.

== Classification ==
Since its initial classification as an intermediate between crocodilians and dinosaurs, and its subsequent reclassification into a clade of its own, Aristosuchus has generally been placed in the family Compsognathidae.

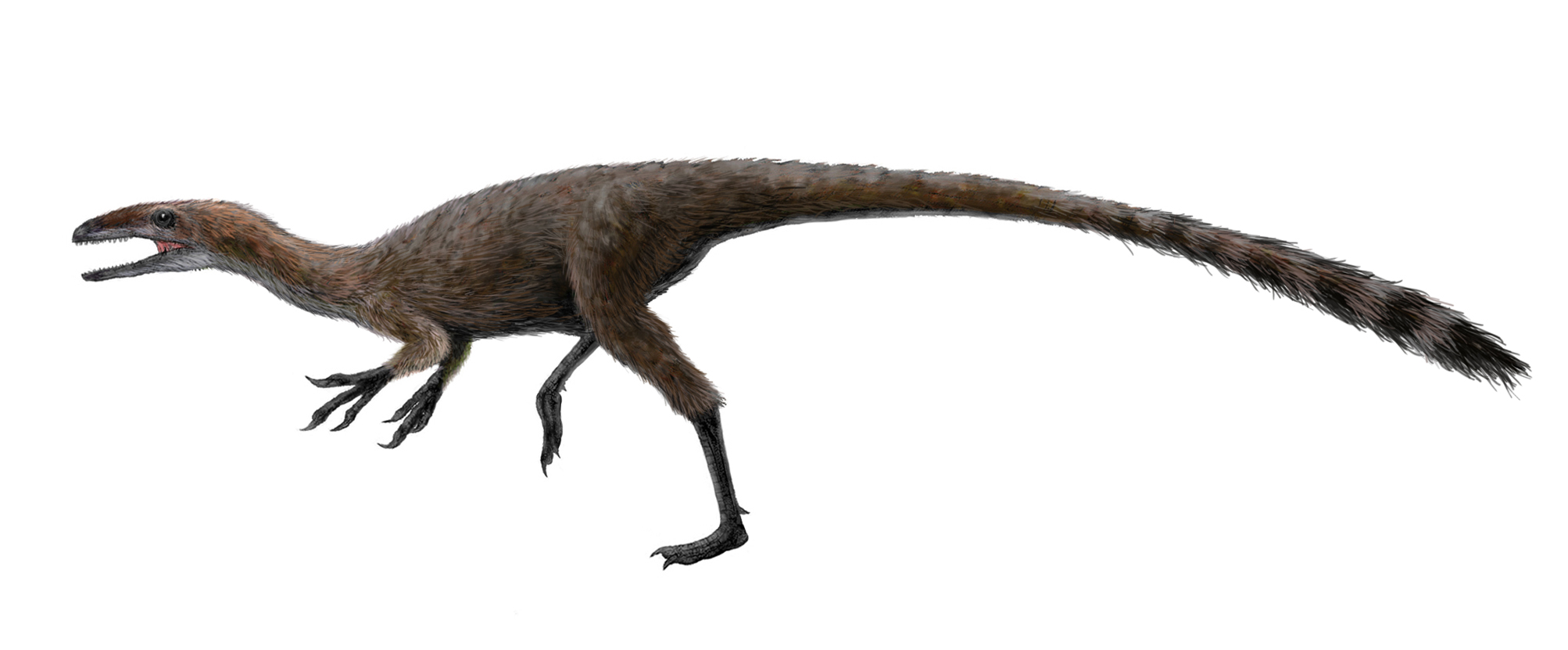
Hypothetical restoration as a compsognathid

=== Historic proposed synonymy with Calamospondylus ===
A. S. Woodward and C. D. Sherborn, in 1890, regarded Aristosuchus pusillus as being based on the same specimen that Reverend William D. Fox named Calamospondylus oweni in 1866, and many authors followed suit (some regarding C. oweni as a nomen nudum). However, in two papers published in 1999 and 2002, Darren Naish demonstrated that Calamospondylus was based on a different specimen than the Aristosuchus holotype based on letters of correspondence between Richard Owen and Reverend Fox as well as discrepancies in the original description.

== Palaeoecology ==
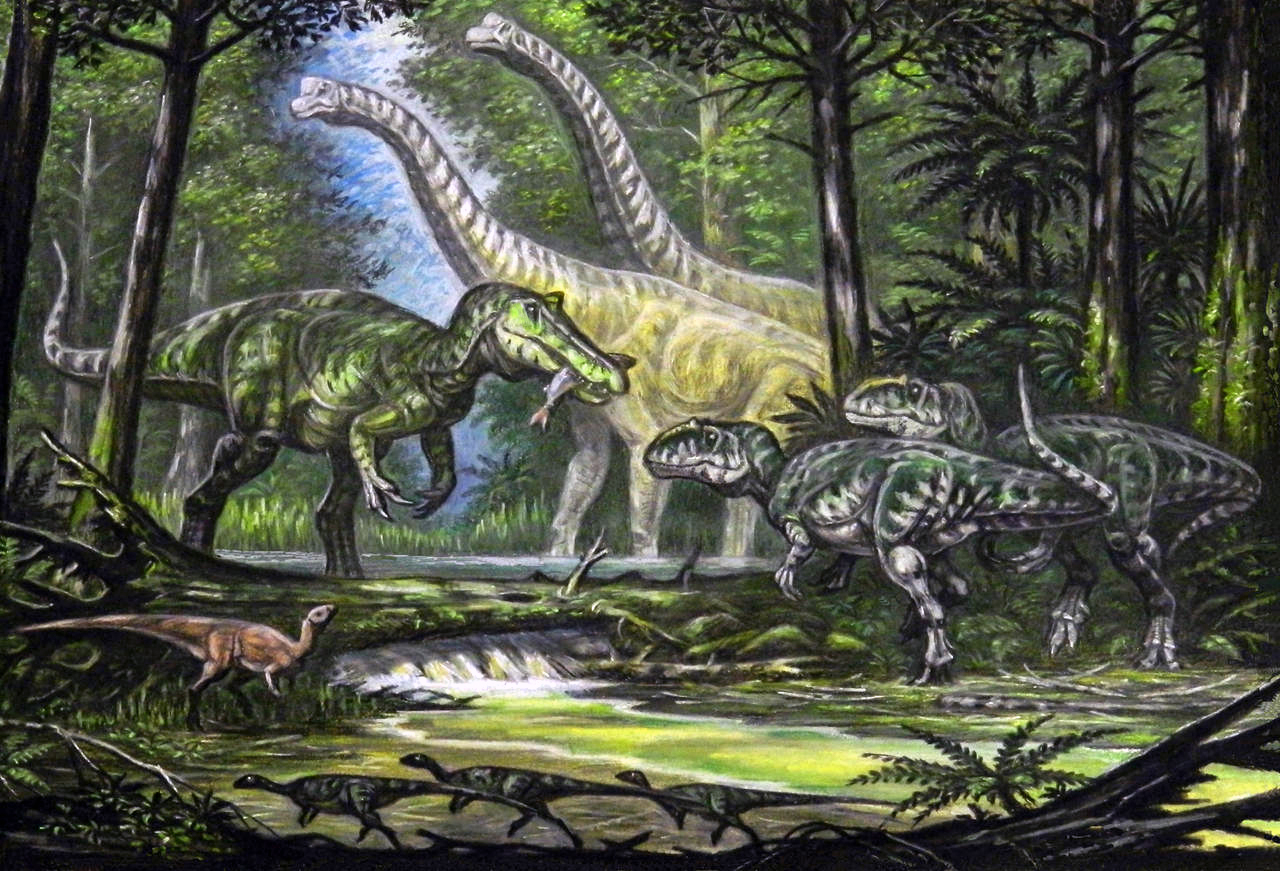
Several dinosaurs from the Isle of Wight: Eucamerotus (background), Baryonyx (left), two Neovenator (right), Valdosaurus (midground), and Hypsilophodon (foreground).

The type specimen of Aristosuchus comes from the Wessex Formation. Sedimentological data suggests that the depositional environment of the Wessex Formation was a floodplain intersected by fluvial (river) and lacustrine (lake) deposits. Water levels likely varied throughout the year, due to there being more evaporation than precipitation, though precipitation was regardless quite high. The Wessex seems to have regularly experienced extreme storms and periodic flood events, resulting in debris flows which would have deposited dead organisms in ponds. Burned plant and insect material and fusain suggests that the environment experienced frequent wildfires, stifling for the most part the dense growth of gymnosperms. Much of the flora of the formed of low ground cover, consisting primarily of pteridophytes, with occasional stands of conifers, cycads and the tree fern Tempskya. Most vertebrate material from the Wessex Formation originates from plant debris beds, resulting from the aforementioned flooding events.

Aside from Aristosuchus, the dinosaur fauna of the Isle of Wight includes the theropods Calamospondylus, Ceratosuchops, Eotyrannus, Invictibellatrix, Neovenator, Ornithodesmus, Riparovenator and Yaverlandia, the sauropods Chondrosteosaurus, Eucamerotus, and Ornithopsis, the thyreophorans Polacanthus and Vectipelta, and the ornithopods Brighstoneus, Comptonatus, Hypsilophodon, Iguanodon, Mantellisaurus, Valdosaurus and Vectidromeus. The pterosaur fauna of the Wessex Formation consists of Coloborhynchus, Caulkicephalus, Istiodactylus, Vectidraco, and Wightia; multiple unnamed pterosaur taxa, including a ctenochasmatid, are also known. Neosuchian crocodyliforms include Bernissartia, Koumpiodontosuchus and Vectisuchus. Limited evidence exists of elasmosaurids and leptocleidid plesiosaurs. The mammal fauna of the Wessex Formation includes the multituberculate Eobataar and the spalacotheriid Yaverlestes. Albanerpetontid amphibians are represented by Wesserpeton. The fish fauna of the Wessex Formation, both bony and cartilaginous, is extensive, including hybodontiform and modern sharks (Selachii), pycnodontiforms, Lepidotes and Scheenstia. Invertebrates are represented by an assortment of non-biting midges, hymenopterans (wasps) including multiple parasitoid taxa, coleopterans (beetles), the avicularoid spider Cretamygale, and the ostracod Cypridea.
