= John Hulke =

British surgeon, geologist and fossil collector (1830–1895)

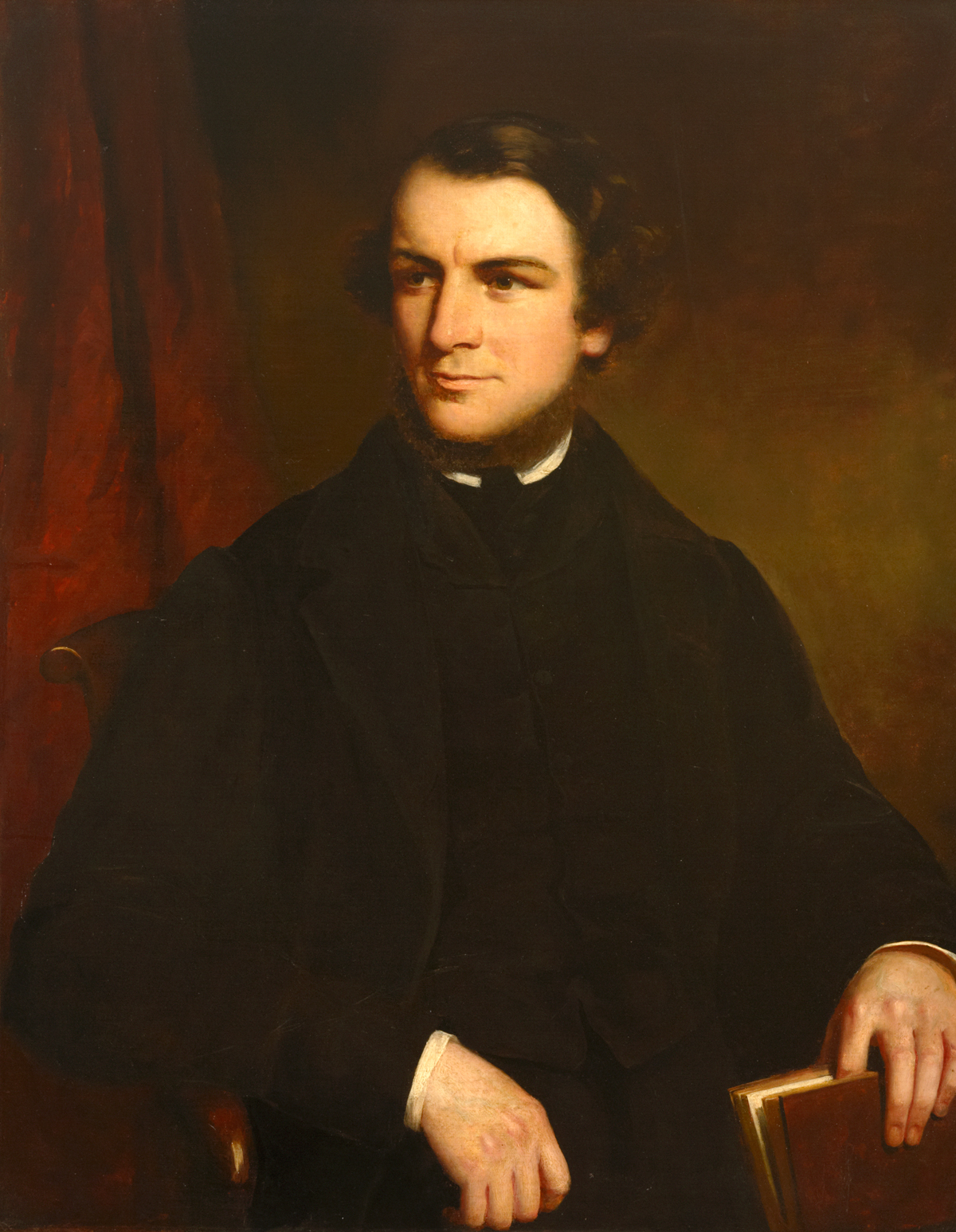
John Whitaker Hulke

John Whitaker Hulke FRCS FRS FGS (6 November 1830 – 19 February 1895) was a British surgeon, geologist and fossil collector. He was the son of a physician in Deal, who became a Huxleyite despite being deeply religious.

Hulke became Huxley's colleague at the Royal College of Surgeons. He was a long-time collector from the Wealden cliffs of the Isle of Wight, and his work on vertebrate palaeontology included studies of Iguanodon and Hypsilophodon from the Wealden (Lower Cretaceous). He became president of the Geological Society (1882–84); and was awarded Wollaston Medal in 1888. He was president of the Pathological Society of London in 1883, and president of the Royal College of Surgeons from 1893 until his death.

== Life ==
Hulke was born in Deal, Kent, the son of a general practitioner. He was educated partly at a boarding-school in England, partly at the Moravian College at Neuwied (1843–1845), where he gained an intimate knowledge of German and an interest in geology through visits to the Eifel district. Of Dutch Reformed descent, and Calvinist leanings, he held strict views: "his Protestantism was of the intolerant kind". He got on well with Huxley, whose agnosticism was also rather strait-laced. After returning from Germany he entered King's College School, and three years later commenced work at the hospital. He qualified MRCS in 1852.

== Career ==
In the Crimean War he volunteered, and was appointed (1855) assistant-surgeon at Smyrna and subsequently during the Siege of Sevastopol. On returning home he became medical tutor at his old hospital, was elected FRCS in 1857, and afterwards assistant-surgeon to the Royal Ophthalmic Hospital, Moorfields (1857), and surgeon (1868–1890).

In 1861, Hulke first described oculodermal melanosis (Nevus of Ota). In 1870 he became surgeon at the Middlesex Hospital, and here much of his more important surgical work was accomplished. His skill as an operator was widely known: he was an excellent general surgeon, but made his special mark as an ophthalmologist. As a geologist he attained a European reputation: he was elected FRS in 1867 for his researches on the anatomy and physiology of the retina in man and the lower animals, particularly the reptiles.

He subsequently devoted all his spare time to geology and especially to the fossil reptilia, describing many remains of dinosaurs from the Isle of Wight. He had access to one of the best private collections of the day: that of Rev. W. Fox on the Isle of Wight. Hulke located a complete Iguanodon braincase in 1869, and offered it to Huxley to describe. Huxley was too busy, but helped Hulke prepare and describe it. Hulke published a string of papers in the Geological Society of London's Quarterly Review. In 1887 the Wollaston Medal was awarded to him by the Geological Society.

He was president of both the Geological and Pathological Societies in 1883, and president of the Clinical Society from 1893 to 1895 and of the Royal College of Surgeons from 1893 until his death. He was a man with a wide range of knowledge not only of science but of literature and art. In all, he published over fifty papers, 28 on dinosaurs. After his death his collection was donated to the Natural History Museum. He delivered the 1891 Bradshaw Lecture at the Royal College of Surgeons on spinal fractures and dislocations.

He was due to read the Hunterian Oration at the Royal College of Surgeons just before his death in February 1895. In the event it was delivered on his behalf by past president Thomas Bryant.

== Sources ==
- obituary: Hulke, John Whitaker 1896 QJ Geol Soc 52
