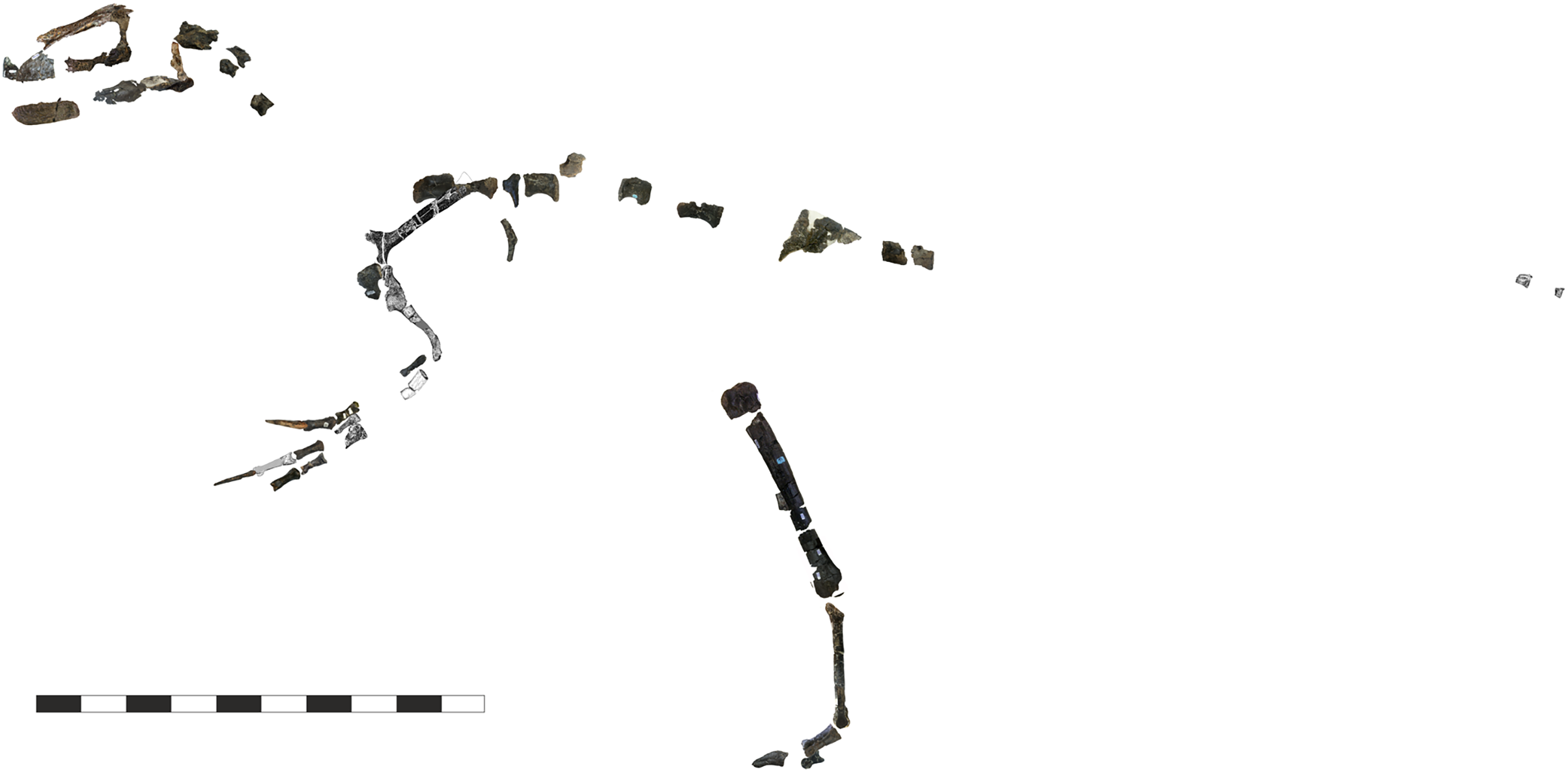
- Known skeletal elements
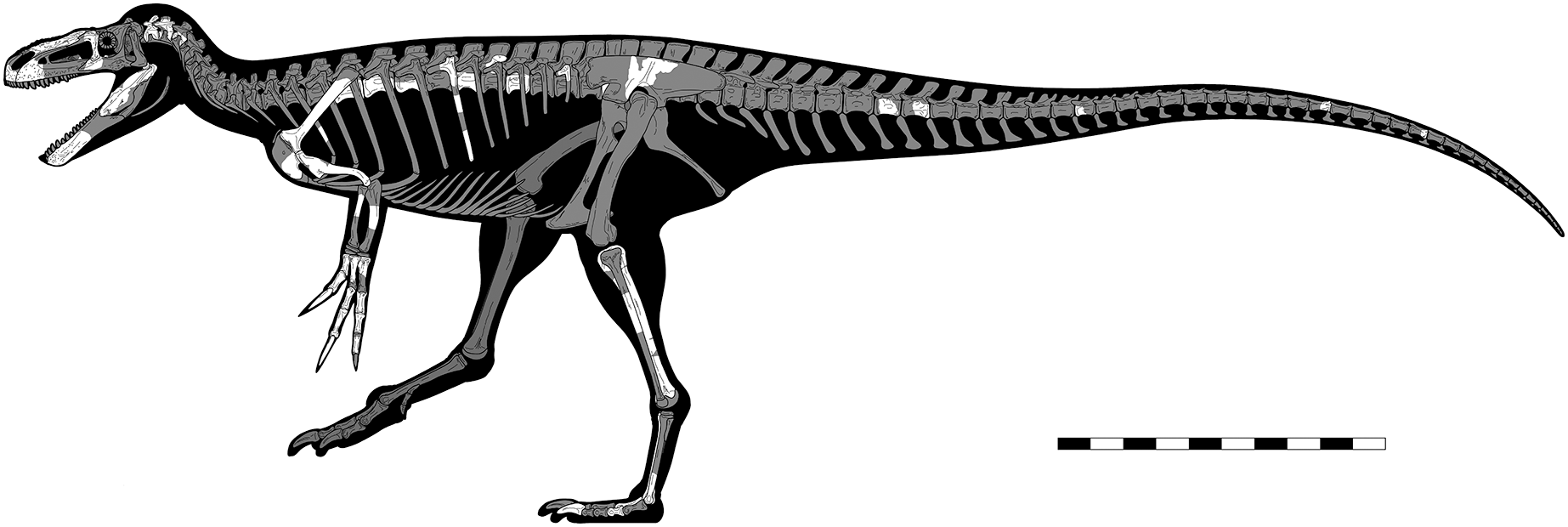
- Skeletal diagram

Scientific classification
- Kingdom: Animalia
- Phylum: Chordata
- Class: Reptilia
- Clade: Dinosauria
- Clade: Saurischia
- Clade: Theropoda
- Clade: Tyrannoraptora
- Superfamily: †Tyrannosauroidea
- Clade: †Pantyrannosauria
- Genus: †Eotyrannus; Hutt et al., 2001
- Species: †E. lengi

Binomial name
- †Eotyrannus lengi Hutt et al., 2001

Synonyms
- "Fusinasus" Hunt, 2002 (nomen nudum); "Gavinosaurus" (nomen nudum); "Lengosaurus" (nomen nudum)

= Eotyrannus =

Eotyrannus Temporal range: Hauterivian–Barremian

Extinct genus of dinosaurs

Eotyrannus (meaning "dawn tyrant") is a genus of tyrannosauroid theropod dinosaur hailing from the Early Cretaceous Wessex Formation beds, included in Wealden Group, located in the southwest coast of the Isle of Wight, United Kingdom. The remains (MIWG1997.550), consisting of assorted skull, axial skeleton and appendicular skeleton elements, from a juvenile or subadult, found in a plant debris clay bed, were described by Stephen Hutt and colleagues in early 2001. The etymology of the generic name refers to the animal's classification as an early tyrannosaur or "tyrant lizard", while the specific name honors the discoverer of the fossil.

== Discovery and naming ==
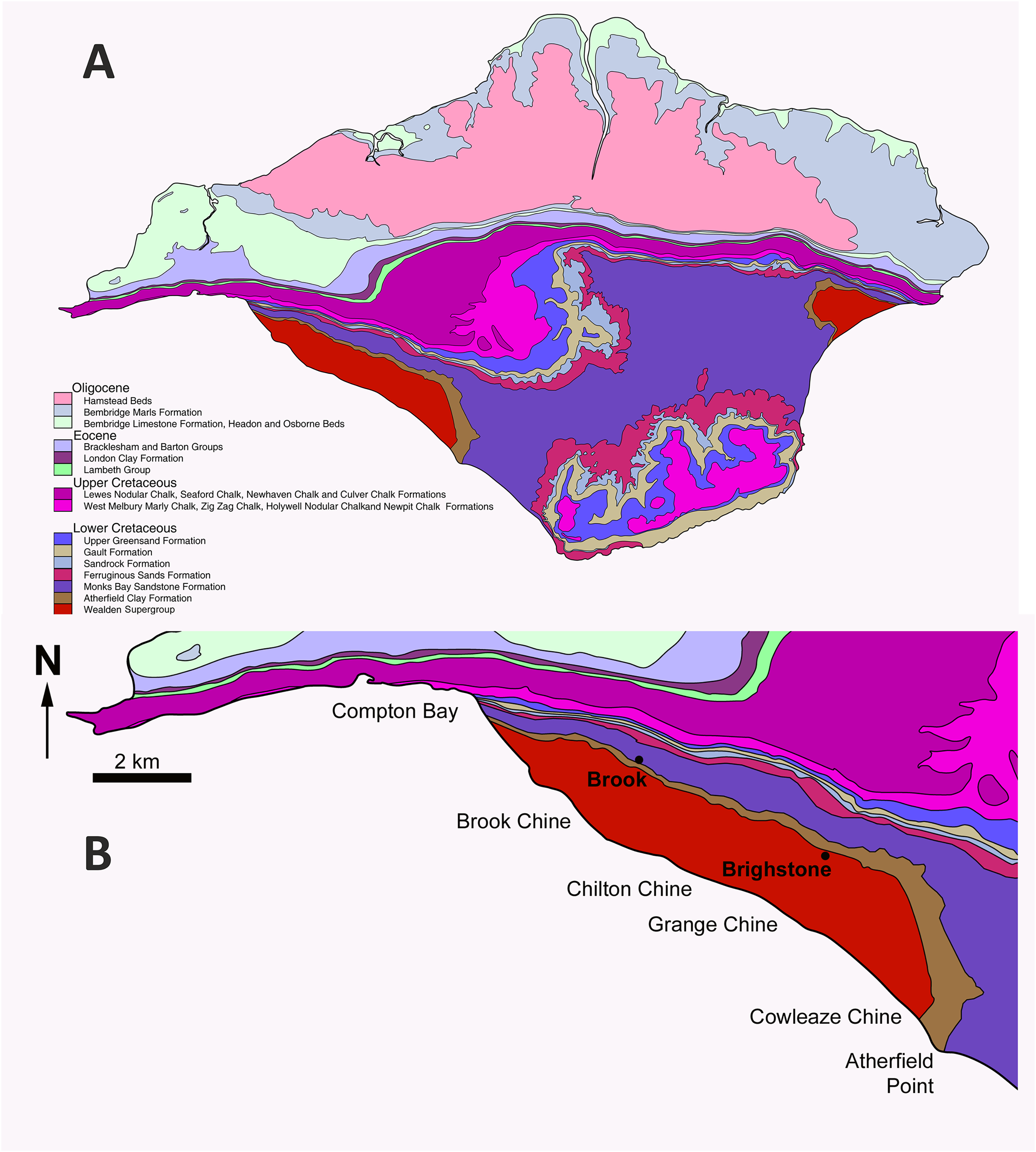
Map of the Isle of Wight; Eotyrannus was discovered at Grange Chine

The exact location of the discovery of the holotype specimen has not been revealed due to its importance and the possibility of new material to be collected as the coastline recedes. From what is mentioned in the description, the specimen was found on the southwestern coast of the Isle of Wight, between Atherfield Point and Hanover Point. In 1995, local collector Gavin Leng brought a claw he had found along the coastline to Steve Hutt who worked at the old Museum of Isle of Wight Geology at Sandown. Gavin Leng revealed the location of where the claw was discovered, and over the next few weeks the site was carefully excavated, and the fossils removed in a hard matrix. Over the next few years the specimen was carefully researched with scientists from the University of Portsmouth, and with help from the Natural History Museum.

Eventually in 2001, Eotyrannus was given its name along with its specific epithet in honour of Mr. Leng. The material was described briefly in 2001 by Hutt et al. In July 2018 Darren Naish, a colleague of Hutt who helped produce the preliminary description, created a GoFundMe fundraiser in order to release a monograph of the specimen, which received well over its goal. The monograph was eventually published in the journal PeerJ in 2022.

== Description ==
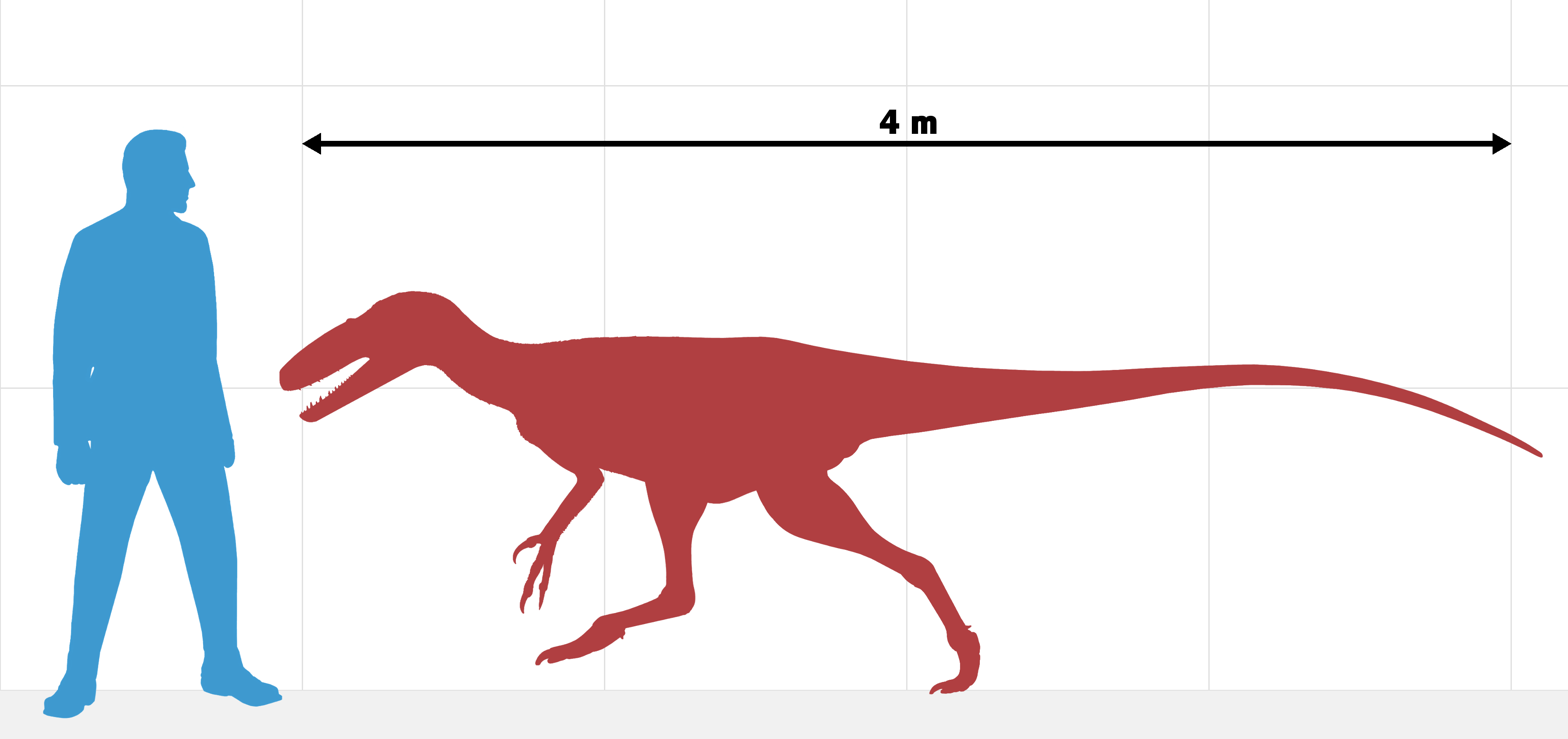
Size of the holotype compared to a human

A number of characters present in the holotypic specimen are unique to the genus. These include: The rostral end of dentary possessing a concave notch housing the most mesial alveolus and a dorsally-directed prong on the rostromedial margin of the notch, curving lateral furrows on the lateral surface of the dentary, a surangular with a hypertrophied gutter-like concavity near the rostrodorsal border, with the caudal end of the concavity containing foramina that perforate the body of the surangular, a low coronoid process on the surangular with a concave area located caudodorsally, and an ulna and radius with a tear-drop shaped cross-section at the mid-shaft.

The holotypic specimen was disarticulated prior to fossilisation, with many elements of its skeleton scattered throughout the assemblage: none of the vertebral column is preserved in articulation and those vertebrae that are preserved consist of separated neural arches and centra, signifying that the holotype was an immature individual.

Due to the relative low-quality preservation of many of the skeletal elements, numerous pieces discovered have been difficult to identify: these include unidentified cranial elements, as well as an "ulna" which has since been recognised as the distal part of the tibia. Before the proper identification of this fragment, Eotyrannus was reconstructed with much longer tibiae, which influenced the early reconstructions of the animal.

Many of the characters also presented as unique to the genus in the diagnosis of Hutt et al. (2001) are in fact widespread throughout Tyrannosauroidea, for example the presence of 'serrated carinae on D-shaped premaxillary teeth' is far from unique to E. lengi. Furthermore, neither the presence of a laterally flattened rostral region to the maxilla nor a pronounced rim to the antorbital fossa are unique to the genus.

Although the specimen itself measures up to 4.5 m (15 ft) in length, it doesn't represent the size of an adult; the specimen likely belongs to a subadult due to the lack of fusion regarding the neurocentral and sacral sutures.

== Classification ==
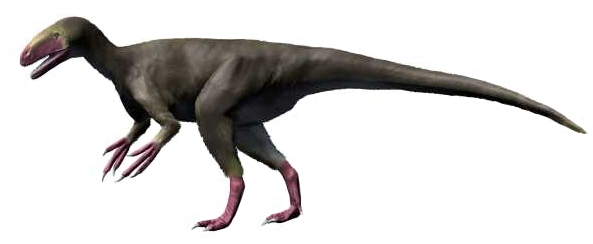
Life restoration

The discovery of Eotyrannus corroborates the notion that early tyrannosauroids were gracile with long forelimbs and three-fingered grasping hands, although the somewhat large size of the animal either means that early evolution for this clade was carried out at a large size or Eotyrannus developed large size independently. The find of this animal in Europe puts in question to the purported Asian origin for these animals along with North American Stokesosaurus and European Aviatyrannis arguing for a more complex biogeography for tyrannosauroids.

A 2014 analysis found Eotyrannus to be a megaraptoran closely related to taxa like Megaraptor.

The 2022 osteology by Naish and Cau by comparison, classifies Eotyrannus as an intermediate gracile tyrannosauroid more closely related to the true tyrannosaurids; more advanced than proceratosaurids, stokesosaurids and Yutyrannus, but without the characteristics of more advanced genera. Simultaneously, the description of Eotyrannus' placement in the family suggests that Megaraptora are tyrannosauroids as well, even though it was found that Eotyrannus is not a megaraptoran itself according to the authors' research, with Megaraptora representing a second wave of large-bodied tyrannosauroids that were important members of the world's ecosystem, one that may have originally slowed the evolutionary radiation of tyrannosaurids initially.

- Tyrannosauroidea
  - Juratyrant
  - Stokesosaurus
  - - Coeluridae
    - - Proceratosauridae
      - - Yutyrannus
        - - Eotyrannus
          - - Xiongguanlong
            - - Megaraptora
                - Siats
                - - Aniksosaurus
                  - - Chilantaisaurus
                    - - Fukuiraptor
                      - Megaraptoridae
                        - Aerosteon
                        - Australovenator
                        - Megaraptor
                        - Orkoraptor
              - - Dryptosaurus
                - - Appalachiosaurus
                  - - Bistahieversor
                    - Teratophoneus
                    - - Tyrannosauridae

In 2024, Andrea Cau recovered Eotyrannus as a sister taxon of Proceratosauridae, distant in relation from Megaraptora.

== Palaeoenvironment ==
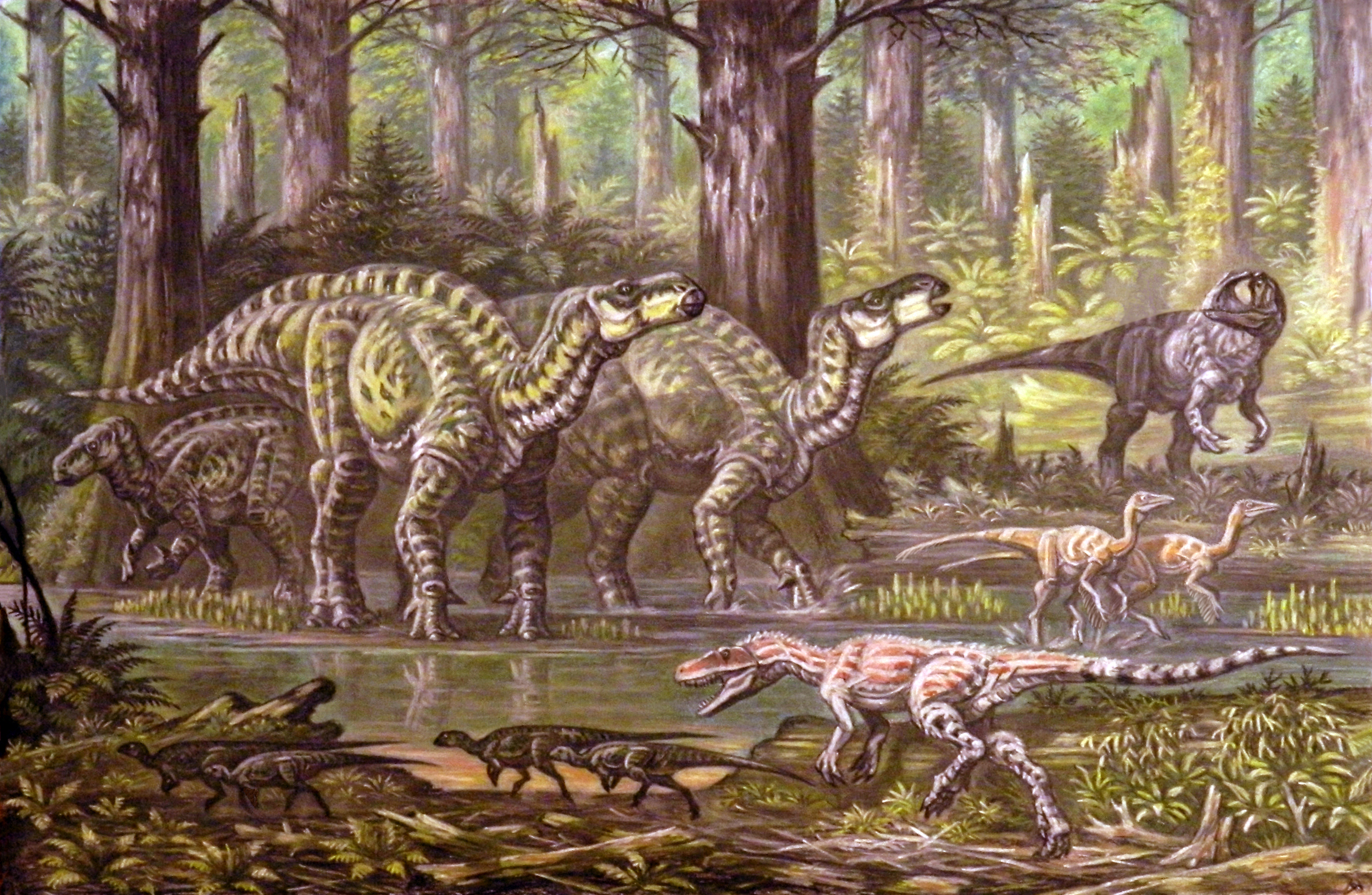
Restoration of Eotyrannus chasing Hypsilophodon, with other dinosaurs from the Wessex Formation in the background

The Wessex Formation, where Eotyrannus was found, was considered to have been warm and humid, similar to the present-day Mediterranean. However, there is evidence of a phase of increasing aridity during the late Barremian to early Aptian when Eotyrannus lived. In the Wessex Basin, sedimentological evidence, as well as fossils such as mud-cracks, suggests that the area experienced a warm, equable paleoclimate with a mean annual temperature of 20–25 °C with low seasonal rainfall. Watson and Alvin (1996) and Allen (1998) showed that the Wessex Formation flora was both fire and drought resistant and suggested that it was adapted to a seasonal climate with periods of marked aridity. Evidence for a wet season is provided by the frequent occurrence of fungal decay in plant material from the plant debris beds.

The Wessex Formation possessed a wide array of fauna, including many other dinosaurs such as the carcharodontosaurian Neovenator, the compsognathid Aristosuchus; the medium size spinosaurids Riparovenator and Ceratosuchops; the basal neornithischian Hypsilophodon; the ornithopods Iguanodon, Mantellisaurus, Brighstoneus, and Valdosaurus; the sauropods Ornithopsis, Eucamerotus, and Iuticosaurus; and the ankylosaur Polacanthus. There were many contemporary mammal species which Eotyrannus likely fed on, including the spalacotheriid Yaverlestes and the eobaatarid Eobaatar.

== See also ==
- Timeline of tyrannosaur research
