= William Fox (palaeontologist) =

English clergyman and palaeontologist

- Fox, preparing a dinosaur specimen
- Born: 9 August 1813; Cumberland, United Kingdom
- Died: 1881 (aged 68-69); United Kingdom
- Citizenship: British
- Scientific career
- Fields: Palaeontology

William Fox (9 August 1813 – 1881) was an English clergyman and palaeontologist who worked on the Isle of Wight and made some significant discoveries of dinosaur fossils.

The Reverend William Fox was born in Cumberland on 9 August 1813. He moved to the Isle of Wight in 1862 to take up the post of curate at the Parish church of St Mary the Virgin in Brixton (now known as Brighstone). He resigned his post in 1867 but continued to live in the area to carry on his collecting. In 1875, he became curate of nearby Kingston, near Shorwell.

Although lacking formal scientific training Fox was remarkably astute and discussed his findings with eminent palaeontologists of the day including John Hulke (1830-1895) and Sir Richard Owen (1804-1892). Fox had easy access to Brighstone Bay from his home, Myrtle Cottage in Brighstone, and so spent many an hour collecting fossils, much to the detriment of his pastoral work; in fact, it was said of him at the time, by the wife of the vicar, that it was "always bones first and the parish next". He is also quoted as having written in a letter to Owen "I cannot leave this place while I have any money left to live on, I take such deep [sic] in hunting for old dragons". He died in 1881 aged 68 or 69.

In 1882 Fox's collection of more than 500 specimens was acquired by the Natural History Museum after his death.

Fox is credited with the finding of several species, most described by his friend Owen, and named by him after their finder. These include Polacanthus foxii, Hypsilophodon foxii, Eucamerotus foxi, Iguanodon foxii, Calamosaurus foxii (formerly Calamospondylus) and Aristosuchus.

== Confusion with William Darwin Fox ==
There is considerable confusion between Fox and his more celebrated contemporary the similarly named Rev. William Darwin Fox (23 April 1805 - 8 April 1880) who was also an amateur scientist and lived and worked on the Isle of Wight at the same time. William Darwin Fox is sometimes ascribed the credit for early dinosaur discoveries. However William Darwin Fox was noted for his geological work, and entomology, but is not recorded as having any particular interest in dinosaurs.
