= Calamospondylus =

Calamospondylus Temporal range: Early Cretaceous, 130 Ma

Scientific classification
- Kingdom: Animalia
- Phylum: Chordata
- Class: Reptilia
- Clade: Dinosauria
- Clade: Saurischia
- Clade: Theropoda
- Clade: Avetheropoda
- Clade: Coelurosauria
- Genus: †Calamospondylus; Fox, 1866
- Species: †C. oweni

Binomial name
- †Calamospondylus oweni Fox, 1866

Extinct genus of dinosaurs

Calamospondylus (meaning "reed vertebrae") is a dubious genus of theropod dinosaur. It lived during the Early Cretaceous and its fossils were found on the Isle of Wight in southern England. The type species is C. oweni, named in 1866 in an anonymous publication written largely by its discoverer, the Reverend William Fox. The description given by Fox was brief and listed no unique diagnostic characteristics; between this and the fact that the specimen has been lost, C. oweni is now considered a nomen dubium. The presence of expansive hollows in the bone led Fox to speculate that it was arboreal, leaping from tree to tree, or alternatively that it was a hopping animal.

== Taxonomy ==
=== Discovery and naming ===
The type specimen of Calamospondylus, consisting of a 15.2 cm (6.0 in) long sacrum preserving five vertebrae and assorted "iliac bones", was collected by the Rev. William Fox in 1865, in Isle of Wight sediments from the Wessex Formation. It was described anonymously by Fox the following year, making it the earliest named small Wealden Group theropod. The genus name Fox provided, Calamospondylus, derives from the Ancient Greek kalamos ("reed"), and spondylus ("vertebra"), and was named "from the fact of its backbones being hollow, smooth, and compact like a reed". The species name honours Sir Richard Owen. Though at one point regarded as a nomen nudum (naked name), given its publication in an informal source (The Athenaeum), the name C. oweni satisfies the criteria of the International Commission on Zoological Nomenclature in that it was accompanied by a description. Said description is, however, terse and lacks figures, and thus little is known of the anatomy of the specimen, as it has since been lost. It was included within a larger body of text which appears to have been written not by Fox himself, but by an editor of The Athenaeum, as it refers to Fox in the third-person. In the section written by Fox, he suggested, based on the fact that C. oweni's bones were hollow and extensively pneumatised, that it was arboreal, leaping between trees, or perhaps saltatorial, "bounding from the grasp of other reptiles" like a grasshopper; this marks one of the earliest speculations on arboreal habits in non-avian dinosaurs.

=== Validity ===
In 1889, Richard Lydekker independently assigned the name Calamospondylus to another Wessex Formation dinosaur, which he named C. foxi after Reverend Fox. Upon becoming aware of Fox's Calamospondylus, he renamed the genus to Calamosaurus in 1891. This initial error led to significant confusion over the years, though it was not the only factor. Some confusion emerged over the identity of the type specimen, which was not specified in Fox's description. Various authors have concluded that it was the same specimen that served as the holotype for another Wessex coelurosaur, Aristosuchus, and the name Aristosuchus would thus take priority. However, there exist discrepancies in both size and morphology between the two specimens, and correspondence between Richard Owen and Reverend Fox demonstrates that they were distinct specimens. With that said, the validity of Calamospondylus is uncertain to begin with. The specimen has been lost, and the few characters used to diagnose C. oweni (the presence of five fused sacral vertebrae, a small body size, bones which are more hollow than those of modern birds, and the presence of foramina in at least some of those bones) are not unique to that genus. Therefore, in 2002, Darren Naish rendered Calamospondylus oweni a nomen dubium.

== See also ==
- Aristosuchus
