= Cretamygale =

Cretamygale Temporal range: Barremian, 128 Ma
- Holotype specimen of Cretamygale in amber

Scientific classification
- Kingdom: Animalia
- Phylum: Arthropoda
- Subphylum: Chelicerata
- Class: Arachnida
- Order: Araneae
- Infraorder: Mygalomorphae
- Clade: Avicularioidea
- Genus: †Cretamygale
- Species: †C. chasei

Binomial name
- †Cretamygale chasei Selden, 2002

Extinct genus of spiders

Cretamygale is a genus of extinct mygalomorph spiders known from the Wessex Formation from the Isle of Wight, UK, dating the Barremian stage of the Early Cretaceous, around 128 million years ago. It contains only one species, C. chasei, known from a single specimen found in amber near Chilton Chine. It was tentatively assigned to the Nemesiidae in the original description. Later studies considered it indeterminate within the Avicularioidea.
