= Synorerpeton =

Synorerpeton Temporal range: Late Cretaceous, late Maastrichtian

Scientific classification
- Kingdom: Animalia
- Phylum: Chordata
- Class: Amphibia
- Order: †Allocaudata
- Family: †Albanerpetontidae
- Genus: †Synorerpeton; Guillaume et al., 2026
- Species: †S. ribagorzana

Binomial name
- †Synorerpeton ribagorzana Guillaume et al., 2026

Genus of extinct amphibian

Synorerpeton (lit. 'creeping animal at the boundary') is an extinct genus of albanerpetontid amphibian known from the Late Cretaceous (Maastrichtian age) Tremp Formation of Spain. The genus contains a single species, Synorerpeton ribagorzana, known from abundant isolated cranial and postcranial remains. It is the first albanerpetontid named from the Late Cretaceous of Europe.

== Discovery and naming ==
The Synorerpeton fossil material was collected as part of an expedition in 1997 to outcrops of the Tremp Formation (Blasi 2B locality) northwest of the municipality of Arén in Huesca province of northeastern Spain. This work resulted in the processing of more than five tons of rock, which were screened for small fossils. The herpetofauna represented by fossils from this site were described in 2010, and more than 40 individual bones were assigned to Albanerpeton aff. nexuosum. These included several upper and lower jaw bones, a frontal bone, five humeri, and two trunk vertebrae. Later unpublished work by Nieves López Martínez recognized 25 additional specimens from Blasi 2B as belonging to an indeterminate albanerpetontid, while others identified 23 more albanerpetontid bones. The specimens are housed in the paleontological collections of the Museum of Natural Sciences of the University of Zaragoza (MPZ).

In 2026, Alexandre R.D. Guillaume and colleagues described Synorerpeton ribagorzana as a new genus and species of albanerpetontid based on the collection of fossils referable to this clade from Blasi 2B. Specimen MPZ 2009/219, the frontal described in 2010, was designated as the holotype specimen. Only the rear portion of this bone had been recognized previously, but Guillaume et al. found the remaining portion—together comprising a fused pair of frontals—catalogued under the same number. The generic name, Synorerpeton, combines the Ancient Greek words σύνορον (sŭ́noron), meaning 'boundary', and ἑρπετόν (herpetón), meaning 'creeping animal'. Together, the intended meaning is 'creeping animal at the boundary', referencing the close temporal proximity of this taxon to the K–Pg boundary, as well as the proximity of the type locality to the Aragon–Catalonia border. The specific name, ribagorzana, is derived from the Catalan word Ribagorçana, meaning 'from Ribagorça', alluding to the discovery of this species in the historical Ribagorça County and near the Noguera Ribagorçana River.

Synorerpeton represents the first albanerpetontid to be named from Late Cretaceous rocks in Europe. Since these rock layers date to the end of the Maastrichtian (the last age of the Cretaceous period), Synorerpeton is also the youngest (most recent) Mesozoic albanerpetontid known from Europe. Albanerpetontid fossils distinct from this genus are known from other Late Cretaceous localities in Europe—the Santonian-aged Csehbánya Formation of Hungary and the early Maastrichtian Sânpetru Formation of Romania—but have not been given scientific names.

== Classification ==
Guillaume et al. (2026) tested the relationships of albanerpetontids using the phylogenetic matrix they had published earlier that year accompanying the description of the Jurassic albanerpetontid Nabia from Portugal. Synorerpeton was recovered as the sister taxon to "Albanerpeton" galaktion, with these taxa nested within the polyphyletic genus Albanerpeton (sensu lato, in the broad sense). Species assigned to Albanerpeton span multiple continental landmasses from the Cretaceous through the Cenozoic, and several analyses have failed to support the monophyly of the genus (instead recovering other albanerpetontids, such as Yaksha or Shirerpeton, nested within it). As such, Guillaume and colleagues recommended restricting Albanerpeton (sensu stricto, in the strict sense) to the European, Cenozoic species A. inexpectatum and A. pannonicum, while other species should be revised and given new generic names. These results are displayed in the cladogram below:

- Albanerpetontidae
  - Anoualerpeton priscum
  - - - Anoualerpeton unicum
      - Purbeck Group species
    - - Nabia civiscientrix
      - - Wesserpeton evansae
        - - Celtedens ibericus
          - - Celtedens megacephalus
            - - Shirerpeton isajii
              - Albanerpeton (sensu lato)
                - "Albanerpeton" ektopistikon
                - - "Albanerpeton" arthridion
                  - - Sânpetru Formation species
                    - - "Albanerpeton" cifellii
                      - "Albanerpeton" gracilis
                      - - "Albanerpeton" galaktion
                        - Synorerpeton ribagorzana
                      - - Yaksha perettii
                        - Paskapoo Formation species
                        - - - "Albanerpeton" nexuosum
                            - "Albanerpeton" sp., cf. "A." nexuosum
                              (Cedar Mountain Formation)
                          - Albanerpeton (sensu stricto)
                            - Albanerpeton inexpectatum
                            - Albanerpeton pannonicum
