= Anoualerpeton =

Anoualerpeton Temporal range: 166–140 Ma Bathonian to Berriasian
- A. unicum maxilla (top) and dentary (bottom)

Scientific classification
- Kingdom: Animalia
- Phylum: Chordata
- Class: Amphibia
- Order: †Allocaudata
- Family: †Albanerpetontidae
- Genus: †Anoualerpeton; Gardner et al., 2003

Species
- †A. unicum Gardner et al., 2003 (type); †A. priscum Gardner et al., 2003

Extinct genus of amphibians

Anoualerpeton is an extinct genus of amphibian in the family Albanerpetontidae. It is the oldest and most primitive albanerpetontid known. Fossils have been found of two different species, Anoualerpeton priscum from the Middle Jurassic (Bathonian) aged Forest Marble and Kilmaluag formations of England and Scotland, and Anoualerpeton unicum from Late Jurassic-Early Cretaceous (Tithonian-Berriasian) Ksar Metlili Formation of Morocco. A. unicum is the only named albanerpetontid from Gondwana.

== Etymology ==
The name "Anoualerpeton" is composed of Anoual, the name of a city in the eastern High Atlas (Morocco), in whose relative proximity the type material of the type species Anoualerpeton unicum was found, and the ancient Greek word ἑρπετόν herpeton, which means 'creeping animal' and is often used in the generic names of fossil amphibians. The epithets "priscum" and "unicum" mean 'old' and 'unique', respectively, which refers to the fact that Anoualerpeton priscum is geologically the oldest albanerpetontid and Anoualerpeton unicum the only albanerpetontid that occurs on the former large southern continent of Gondwana. The specific names "priscus" and "unicus" were used when the taxa were named in 2003. In 2018, these were corrected to match the neuter form of the suffix -erpeton used in the generic name.

A. priscum holotype premaxilla

== Morphology ==
A. unicum holotype premaxilla

Anoualerpeton does not have any unique features (autapomorphies), but is characterized by a mosaic of features that occur either in Albanerpeton but not in Celtedens or in Celtedens but not in Albanerpeton. Thus, the occlusal margin of maxillary and dental teeth is convex in labial and lingual view, respectively, and the teeth in the middle third of the row are the longest, both of which are otherwise only known from the species Albanerpeton nexuosus. The processus internasalis of the azygic frontal, i.e., the end of the bone resulting from the fusion of the originally paired frontal structures, which is flanked by the nasal bone and points towards the tip of the snout, tapers to a point. The lateral edges of this process are designed as a kind of groove into which the edges of the nasalia engage (tongue-and-groove), both of which occur in Albanerpeton but not in Celtedens. In addition, the length-width ratio of the frontal is relatively large, and the frontal is bell-shaped rather than triangular in dorsal and ventral view, features which Anoualerpeton shares only with Celtedens but not with Albanerpeton.

The two Anoualerpeton species differ primarily in the location of the suprapalatal pit. This is a depression in the inner side (lingual side) of that part of the premaxilla that reaches up to the roof of the skull (pars dorsalis). In Anoualerpeton priscum, the suprapalatal fossa lies in the medial edge of the external nasal opening. In Anoualerpeton unicum, however, it lies further medial, outside the border of the external nasal opening.

== Locality ==
As is common for albanerpetontids, the remains of Anoualerpeton all come from so-called microvertebrate localities, i.e., isolated, relatively small bones obtained by slurrying and sieving samples of the sedimentary rock in which they were embedded.

The older species Anoualerpeton priscum originates from the Kirtlington Mammal Bed ("Kirtlington mammal layer") in the lowest part of the Forest Marble Formation of the Bathonian of Central England. The Kirtlington Mammal Bed is the most productive microvertebrate deposit of the Kirtlington Quarry, a limestone quarry west of Kirtlington, about 15 kilometers north of Oxford. It consists of a weakly consolidated clayey marl, which was probably deposited in a swampy environment and contains, among other things, teeth of dinosaurs and early mammaliaformes. The material from Kirtlington, classified as Anoualerpeton priscum, was formerly assigned to the genera Albanerpeton or Celtedens. In 2020, a connected pair of premaxillae similar to those of A. priscum were reported from the Kilmaluag Formation of the Isle of Skye, Scotland. The deposit is equivalent in age to the Kirtlington Mammal Bed, and is thought to have been deposited in a coastal lagoon.

The younger species Anoualerpeton unicum, which is also a type species of the genus, was identified in the microvertebrate fauna of the Ksar Metlili Formation in the eastern High Atlas. The locality is located in the south of the Talsint province of Morocco, about 100 kilometers east of the city of Anoual. The deposit is located in a lens of non-marine limestone embedded in marine sediments in the upper part of the so-called Couches Rouges ("red layers"). These marine sediments have been uncertainly dated by coccolithophorids to the Berriasian, but have also been considered Tithonian. Also in Ksar Met Lili, dinosaurs can be found and, due to the lower geological age, also representatives of the mammalian crown group (Mammalia).

== Phylogeny ==
The species of Anoualerpeton represent the earliest known diverging albanerpetontid forms. In their 2026 description of the more derived Synorerpeton, Guillaume et al. recovered the following cladogram:

- Albanerpetontidae
  - Anoualerpeton priscum
  - - - Anoualerpeton unicum
      - Purbeck Group species
    - - Nabia civiscientrix
      - - Wesserpeton evansae
        - - Celtedens ibericus
          - - Celtedens megacephalus
            - - Shirerpeton isajii
              - Albanerpeton (sensu lato)
                - "Albanerpeton" ektopistikon
                - - "Albanerpeton" arthridion
                  - - Sânpetru Formation species
                    - - "Albanerpeton" cifellii
                      - "Albanerpeton" gracilis
                      - - "Albanerpeton" galaktion
                        - Synorerpeton ribagorzana
                      - - Yaksha perettii
                        - Paskapoo Formation species
                        - - - "Albanerpeton" nexuosum
                            - "Albanerpeton" sp., cf. "A." nexuosum
                              (Cedar Mountain Formation)
                          - Albanerpeton (sensu stricto)
                            - Albanerpeton inexpectatum
                            - Albanerpeton pannonicum
