= Albanerpeton =

Albanerpeton Temporal range: Aptian–Gelasian
- Albanerpeton inexpectatum

Scientific classification
- Kingdom: Animalia
- Phylum: Chordata
- Class: Amphibia
- Order: †Allocaudata
- Family: †Albanerpetontidae
- Genus: †Albanerpeton; Estes and Hoffstetter, 1976

Species
- †A. inexpectatum Estes and Hoffstetter, 1976. Re-described by Gardner, 1999. (type); †A. galaktion Fox and Naylor, 1981; †A. nexuosus Estes, 1981; †A. arthridion Fox and Naylor, 1982; †A. cifellii Gardner, 1999; †A. gracilis Gardner, 2000; †A. pannonicum Venczel and Gardner, 2005; †A. ektopistikon Carrano et al., 2022

Extinct genus of amphibians

Albanerpeton is an extinct genus of salamander-like albanerpetontid amphibian found in North America, Europe and Asia first appearing in Cretaceous-aged strata. There are eight described members of the genus, and one undiagnosed species from the Paskapoo Formation, making it by far the most speciose genus in the family. Members of the genus had a robust head and neck which likely allowed them to actively burrow, characteristic of fossorial species, and they lived in a wide range of environments. This genus of amphibian was the last of its order, surviving until into the Early Pleistocene (Gelasian) of northern Italy, and possibly northern Spain, until around 2 million years ago. It likely became extinct when the region developed its present Mediterranean-type climate, having preferred one that was cold and humid. The monophyly of Albanerpeton has recently been questioned, with some authors regarding the genus as paraphyletic.

== History and discovery ==
Albanerpeton was first described by Estes and Hoffstetter in 1976. However, the genus was re-described by Gardner in 1999 after a large collection of jaws and frontals from Miocene fissure fills near La Grive-Saint-Alban in southeastern France was found. When the type species was originally described, it was considered to be a salamander, despite possessing no known features that were otherwise restricted to Urodela, as its only salamander-like features were held in common with small, limbed, and non-saltatorial amphibians in general. A. inexpectatum had many unique characteristics, distinct from salamanders and other amphibians (such as its feeding apparatus, dermal bones of the skull, and anterior cervical vertebrae) that Fox and Naylor suggested it be classified in its own order, Allocaudata, family, Albanerpetontidae, and genus, Albanerpeton, all of which were new at the time. Seven of the eight species are restricted to the Western Interior of North America, suggesting that the evolutionary history of the genus was centered there, although the presence of a sole species in France, A. inexpectatum, suggests a Tertiary dispersal of an unknown species from North America into Europe. Albanerpeton jaws and frontals are the most commonly recovered Albanerpeton bones found at dig sites, but these bones exhibit many characteristics that are taxonomically and phylogenetically informative for the genus and individual species within it.

== Evolutionary history ==
The oldest species of Albanerpeton as usually defined are known from the late Early Cretaceous of North America. During the Late Cretaceous, Albanerpeton was widespread in North America, as well as in Europe (and was present in Asia if remains from the Khodzhakul Formation in Uzbekistan are included). The youngest remains of the species in North America are known from the Paskapoo Formation in Canada, dating to the Paleocene. The Cenozoic record of Albanerpeton is largely confined to Europe, spanning from the Oligocene to the final records of the group in the Early Pleistocene of Italy, around 2.13-2 million years ago. Fossils are also known from the Oligocene of Anatolia in Asia.

== Ecology ==
Albanerpeton is suggested to have had a preference for moist environments. Albanerpetontids are proposed to have been sit-and-wait predators that fed on invertebrates via the use of a ballistic tongue similar to that used by chameleons and plethodontid salamanders.

== Description ==
Albanerpeton are distinct from frogs, salamanders, and caecilians, forming their own family of Lissamphibia, Albanerpetontidae. Membership of species in the family is determined by diagnostic character states of the frontals and premaxillary synapomorphies, both of which can be used to further diagnose less inclusive clades in the genus. These less inclusive clades are the gracile-snouted clade and robust-snouted clade, made up of three and four species respectively though only three of the robust-snouted clade have been fully described. The gracile-snouted clade is defined by a triangular to slit-shaped suprapalatal pit. The robust-snouted clade is defined by a robust premaxilla, a short pars dorsalis that is sutured dorsally with the nasal, a short premaxillary lateral process on the maxilla, and an internasal process on frontals that are both narrow and similar to spines. The origins of these sister, snout-based clades can both be traced back to the early Late Cretaceous, and therefore antedate the Campanian. A. arthridion is interpreted as the most primitive species of Albanerpeton, being quite small. Its small size forms the basis for the hypothesis that reduced body size is derived and was developed at least twice within the genus. Diagnostic characteristics of the genus itself include characteristics of the teeth and skull.

=== Dentition ===
Albanerpeton teeth are about one-third of the distance from the anterior end of the tooth row, and these are markedly larger than other nearby teeth. Additionally, the dorsal edge of the dental boundary is curved on its lingual side.

=== Skull ===
In 2013, Maddin et al. created a computer-generated tomography of a partially preserved, three-dimensional A. pannonicum neurocranium which deposited during the Pliocene in Hungary. The structure of this specimen is in line with what is known of older Albanerpeton neurocrania, and therefore a good reference for what the neurocranium of the whole genus is like. Features of the reconstructed skull consist of a robust, box-like unit composed of coossification of the parasphenoid, otic capsules, and occipital elements with no trace of fusion or sutural points of contact among these components. Additionally, the anterior three-quarters of the dorsal surface is open, but the furthest posterior portion, tectum synoticum, is fused. The ventral surface of the Albanerpeton neurocranium is fully ossified, solid bone. The neurocranium of Albanerpeton is in contact dorsally with paired parietals, forming the roof of the brain cavity while contacting laterally with the squamosal. Overall, the robust construct of Albanerpeton's neurocranium is consistent with the theory that the genus was fossorial in nature, as the thickened and strengthened skull would have lent itself to burrowing.

Albanerpeton has ossified antotic pillars which sit in front of the otic capsules. Additionally, there are a pair of small, robust bony pedestals that are located ventrolaterally in front of the otic capsules, which likely served to brace the neurocranium against the palatal region and suspensorium. In Albanerpeton, the otic capsules themselves are moderately inflated with a large, rhomboid-shaped fenestra vestibuli present on both capsules. These fenestrae can be used to imply the presence of middle ear ossicles in Albanerpeton. Albanerpeton had well-developed semicircular canals with a modestly developed ventral auditory region as well.

== Classification ==
Current accepted species:

Genus Albanerpeton Estes & Hoffstetter 1976

- Albanerpeton arthridion Fox & Naylor 1982 Early Cretaceous, United States
- Albanerpeton ektopistikon Carrano et al. 2022 Early Cretaceous, North America
- Clade "Gracile-snouted"
  - Albanerpeton gracilis Gardner 2000 Late Cretaceous, North America
  - Albanerpeton cifellii Gardner 1999 Late Cretaceous, United States
  - Albanerpeton galaktion Fox & Naylor 1982 Late Cretaceous, North America
- Clade "Robust-snouted"
  - Albanerpeton nexuosus Estes 1981 Late Cretaceous, North America
  - Albanerpeton pannonicum Venczel & Gardner 2005 Latest Miocene-Early Pleistocene Hungary, Italy
  - Albanerpeton inexpectatum Estes & Hoffstetter 1976 Early Oligocene-Late Miocene, Europe

The genus Albanerpeton is part of the family Albanerpetontidae, which is the only member of the order Allocaudata within Amphibia. In 2018, a closely related species, named Shirerpeton isajii, was discovered and described in the Kuwajima Formation of Japan. While it is closely related to members of Albanerpeton, it does not fall within the clade. Many remains attributed to Albanerpeton from the Late Cretaceous of Europe, such as those from the Maastrichtian aged Densuş-Ciula Formation, Sânpetru Formation and Sard Formation of Romania and the Maastrichtian aged Tremp Formation of Spain, are probably only diagnostic to family level.

Cladogram from Venczel and Gardner (2005):

- Albanerpetontidae
  - Anoualerpeton
  - Celtedens
  - Albanerpeton
    - A. arthridion
    - - Gracile‑snouted clade
        - A. cifellii
        - A. galaktion
        - A. gracilis
      - Robust‑snouted clade
        - A. nexuosus
        - A. pannonicum
        - - Paskapoo sp.
          - A. inexpectatum

In 2020, it was found that Albanerpeton is paraphyletic with respect to Shirerpeton and Yaksha, and it has been suggested that Albanerpeton be restricted to the Cenozoic species, with the Cretaceous species being given separate genera. A similar approach was proposed by Guillaume et al. in their 2026 description of Synorerpeton, who supported including only A. inexpectatum and A. pannonicum in the genus. The results of their phylogenetic analyses are displayed in the cladogram below:

- Albanerpetontidae
  - Anoualerpeton priscum
  - - - Anoualerpeton unicum
      - Purbeck Group species
    - - Nabia civiscientrix
      - - Wesserpeton evansae
        - - Celtedens ibericus
          - - Celtedens megacephalus
            - - Shirerpeton isajii
              - Albanerpeton (sensu lato)
                - "Albanerpeton" ektopistikon
                - - "Albanerpeton" arthridion
                  - - Sânpetru Formation species
                    - - "Albanerpeton" cifellii
                      - "Albanerpeton" gracilis
                      - - "Albanerpeton" galaktion
                        - Synorerpeton ribagorzana
                      - - Yaksha perettii
                        - Paskapoo Formation species
                        - - - "Albanerpeton" nexuosum
                            - "Albanerpeton" sp., cf. "A." nexuosum
                              (Cedar Mountain Formation)
                          - Albanerpeton (sensu stricto)
                            - Albanerpeton inexpectatum
                            - Albanerpeton pannonicum

In their 2022 description of Albanerpeton ektopistikon, Carrano et al. also recovered Albanerpeton as a paraphyletic genus, further separated than in Daza et al. (2020), based on the data matrix from the 2018 description of Shirerpeton isajii. Instead of restricting Albanerpeton to fewer species, they provisionally suggested including Shirerpeton and Wesserpeton in the genus, turning their type species into A. isajii and A. evansae, respectively, though they also suggested that the genus could be split into separate genera. Cladogram from Carrano et al. (2022):

- †Albanerpetontidae
  - - Celtedens
      - Cletedens ibericus
      - Celtedens megacephalus
    - Purbeck Group specimen
  - - Anoualerpeton unicum
    - - Aonualerpeton priscum
      - - Yaksha perettii
        - Alcobaça Formation specimen
    - Albanerpeton
      - Albanerpeton arthridion
      - Albanerpeton (Wesserpeton) evansae
      - Unassigned claw taxon
      - - Albanerpeton ektopistikon
        - Khodzhakul Formation specimen
        - - 'Gracile‑snouted' clade
            - Albanerpeton gracilis
            - Albanerpeton galaktion
            - Albanerpeton cifellii
          - - - Sânpetru Formation specimen
              - Csehbánya Formation specimen
              - Albanerpeton (Shirerpeton) isajii
            - - - Albanerpeton nexuosum
                - Albanerpeton cf. A. nexuosum
              - - Albanerpeton pannonicum
                - - Albanerpeton inexpectatum
                  - Paskapoo Formation specimen
