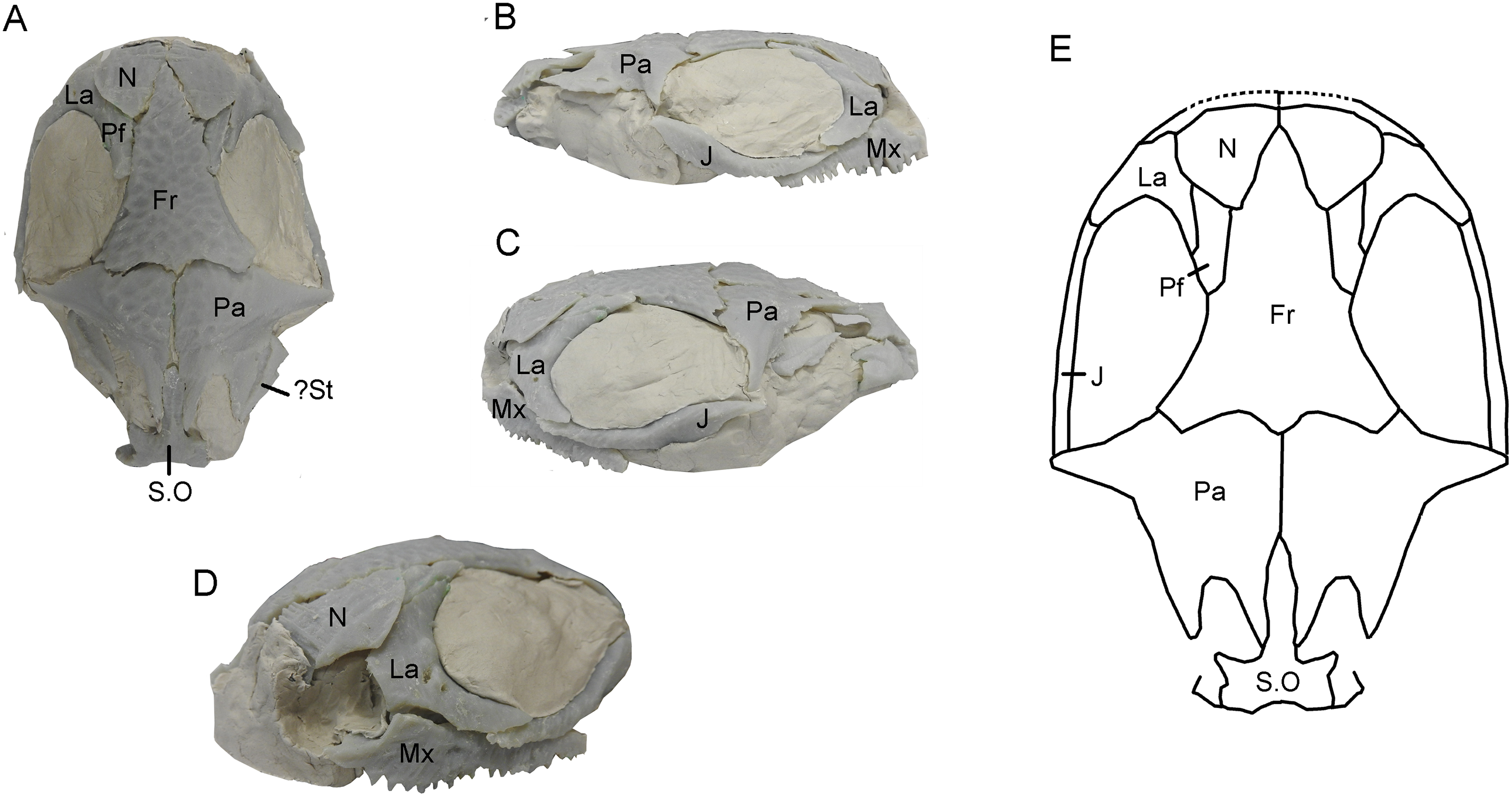
- Reassembled skull seen from multiple angles and a line drawing of the skull

Scientific classification
- Kingdom: Animalia
- Phylum: Chordata
- Class: Amphibia
- Order: †Allocaudata
- Family: †Albanerpetontidae
- Genus: †Shirerpeton; Masumoto & Evans, 2018

Type species
- †Shirerpeton isajii Masumoto & Evans, 2018

= Shirerpeton =

Shirerpeton Temporal range: Early Cretaceous, 145–129.4 Ma

Extinct genus of amphibians

Shirerpeton is an extinct genus of albanerpetontid amphibian from the Early Cretaceous Kuwajima Formation, which is located in Japan. The type species is Shirerpeton isajii, which was described by Masumoto & Evans in 2018. Shirerpeton represents the first record of Albanerpetontidae in East Asia and the holotype is SBEI 2459, a small block bearing most of a disarticulated but associated skull with some postcranial elements present as well.

== Phylogeny ==
From Daza et al (2020):

- - Anoualerpeton
  - - Celtedens
    - - Uña taxon
      - - Wesserpeton
        - - Albanerpeton arthridion
          - - Albanerpeton gracilis + Albanerpeton galaktion
            - - Albanerpeton cifellii
              - - Yaksha
                - - Shirerpeton
                  - - Albanerpeton nexuosum
                    - - Albanerpeton pannonicum
                      - - Paskapoo specimen
                        - Albanerpeton inexpectatum
