= Albanerpetontidae =

Albanerpetontidae Temporal range: Middle Jurassic – Pleistocene Bathonian–Gelasian
- Fossil of Celtedens ibericus, showing the remains of scales surrounding the body in grey
- Skull of Yaksha peretti

Scientific classification
- Kingdom: Animalia
- Phylum: Chordata
- Class: Amphibia
- Order: †Allocaudata; Fox and Naylor, 1982
- Family: †Albanerpetontidae; Fox and Naylor, 1982

Genera
- †Albanerpeton; †Anoualerpeton; †Celtedens; †Nabia; †Shirerpeton; †Synorerpeton; †Wesserpeton; †Yaksha

Synonyms
- Albanerpetonidae; Albanerpetidae

Family of amphibians

The Albanerpetontidae (also spelled Albanerpetidae and Albanerpetonidae) are an extinct family of small amphibians, native to the Northern Hemisphere during the Mesozoic and Cenozoic. The only members of the order Allocaudata, they are thought to be allied with living amphibians belonging to Lissamphibia. Despite a superficially salamander-like bodyform, their anatomy is strongly divergent from modern amphibians in numerous aspects. The fossil record of albanerpetontids spans over 160 million years from the Middle Jurassic to the beginning of the Pleistocene, about 2.13–2 million years ago.

== History of research ==
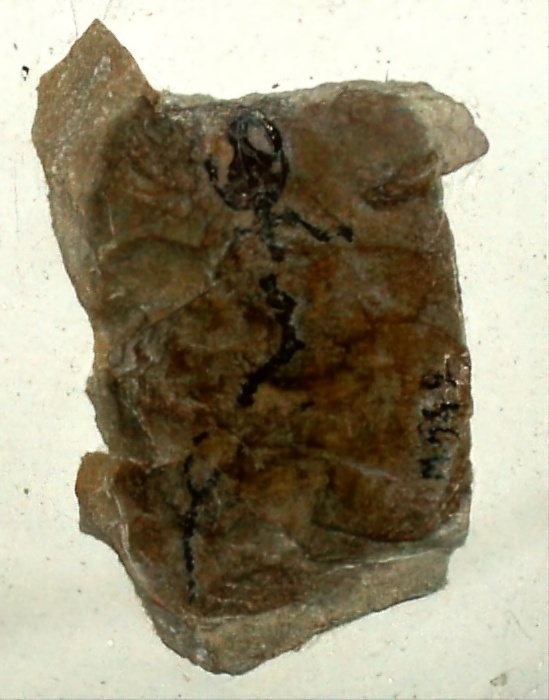
Holotype fossil of Celtedens megacephalus from Italy

The earliest specimen of an albanerpetontid to be discovered was that of Celtedens megacephalus from the Early Cretaceous (Albian) Pietraroja Plattenkalk of Italy, described by Oronzio Gabriele Costa in 1864, and originally placed in the genus Triton, a junior synonym of the salamander genus Triturus. Jaw elements of albanerpetontids from the Cretaceous of North America were assigned to the salamander genus Prosiren by Richard Estes in 1969, erecting the family Prosirenidae to accommodate the genus. Prosiren was originally described by Coleman J. Goin and Walter Auffenberg in 1958, based on vertebrae found in Cretaceous aged deposits in Texas. Albanerpeton, the type genus of the family was first named by Estes and Robert Hoffstetter in 1976 for the species of A. inexpectatum described from a large number of jaws and frontal bones from a Miocene aged fissure fill deposit near Saint-Alban-de-Roche in France, and was initially classified as a salamander, and placed in the family Prosirenidae alongside Prosiren due to the morphological similarity with the jaw fragments attributed to Prosiren by Estes (1969). Richard Fox and Bruce Naylor in 1982 realised that Albanerpeton was not a salamander, noting that the holotype vertebra of Prosiren was different to those of albanerpetontids, concluding that Albanerpeton was "well isolated from salamanders" and that it "seems no nearer phyletically to any other known amphibians, from Devonian to Recent" erecting the family Albanerpetontidae and the order Allocaudata to accommodate it.

== Description ==
Bones of the only articulated albanerpetontid skull, Yaksha peretti, vomer not shown

Albanerpetontids were small (several cm to several tens of centimetres in length) and superficially lizard-like. The skin of albanerpetontids was embedded with bony, fish-like scales. The forelimbs only had four digits, while retaining five digits on the hindlimbs. The morphology of the complete three-dimensionally preserved skull of Yaksha peretti suggests that albanerpetontids had ballistic tongues akin to those of chameleons and plethodontid salamanders, as evidenced by the presence of an elongated rod shaped bone in the jaw cavity, dubbed the hyoid entoglossal process, which in life was embedded within the tongue. Analogous bones exists in chameleons and plethodontids, which allow rapid propulsion of the tongue. A hyoid entoglossal process is also known from Celtedens megacephalus, suggesting that the presence of a ballistic tongue is characteristic for the group. Distinguishing apomorphic traits characteristic of albanerpetontids include a complex mortise and tenon–like joint connecting the dentary bones at the front of the jaw, teeth which are non-pedicellate and slightly tricuspid (bearing three cusps), the frontal bones of the skull display raised polygonal sculpturing, and three anterior cervical components form an 'atlas–axis' complex, similar to that of amniotes. As the middle ear is unknown, it is currently unknown whether the batrachian operculum was present.

== Paleobiology ==
Life restoration of Albanerpeton inexpectatum

The morphology of albanerpetontids suggests that they were sit-and-wait terrestrial predators and fed on invertebrates, similar to living plethodontids. The fact that the skull of the juvenile paratype of Yaksha was around 1/4 of the size of the adult suggests that albanerpetontids grew by direct development and did not have a metamorphic larval stage. It has been suggested that albanerpetontids absorbed oxygen entirely through the skin via cutaneous respiration and lacked lungs like plethodontid salamanders, due to the length of the hyoid entoglossal process, which may have made normal breathing difficult. This proposal is supported by the internal vascularisation and lack of Sharpey's fibres in the frontal bones. Albanerpetontids are associated with both wet and dry environments, but it is unclear how tolerant they were of dry habitats, and they may have been confined to wet microhabitats in dry areas. Some authors have suggested that they were likely fossorial, using their heads to burrow, but this has been questioned by other authors.

== Distribution ==
The distribution of albanerpetontids is largely confined to Eurasia and North America, with remains also known from Morocco in North Africa. The first albanerpetontids are known from the western Palearctic (Europe and North Africa) in the Middle Jurassic (Bathonian ~168–166 million years ago), with the oldest records of the group in North America and Asia dating to the Early Cretaceous. The last known remains of albanerpetontids in North America are from the Paskapoo Formation in Canada, dating to the Paleocene. All other Cenozoic members of the family, belonging to the genus Albanerpeton, are known from Europe and Anatolia, from the Oligocene onwards (there is no fossil record of albanerpetontids during the Eocene) until their final appearance in Northern Italy during the Early Pleistocene, around 2.13-2 million years ago. Another possible late record is known from northern Spain, dating to around 2.2-2.6 million years ago.

== Classification ==
Albanerpetontids were long thought to be salamanders because of their small size and generalized body plans. However, these features are now thought to be ancestral for lissamphibians and not indicative of close relationships between the two groups. Albanerpetontids share with living lissamphibians an atlanto-occipital joint with two cotyles, a four fingered forelimb (manus), ectochordal (spoon shaped with open centra) vertebrae with cylindrical centra, ribs that do not encircle the body, and a salamander-like quadrate–squamosal articulation, but are distinguished from the three living groups of lissamphibians by their possession of keratinized claw sheaths and their retention of skull bones lost in other lissamphibians, including epipterygoids, supraoccipitals and large palatines, as well as the absence of pedicellate teeth or a wide parasphenoid cultriform process. Albanerpetontids are now recognized as a distinct clade of lissamphibians separate from the three living orders of amphibians – Anura (frogs), Caudata (salamanders), and Gymnophiona (caecilians). Many studies show them as more closely related to frogs and salamanders than to caecilians, but bootstrap and Bayesian analyses show that this result is not robust and that they could also be sister-group of the Lissamphibia, or as most closely related to caecillians. The presence of epipterygoids and a separate supraoccipital at least argues against a position within Batrachia. A phylogenetic analysis in 2020 among lissamphibian relationships using multiple methods found no consensus for the position of Albanerpetontidae in relation to other lissamphibians, but they were always placed closer to lissamphibians than to other extinct groups of amphibians, such as lepospondyls and temnospondyls.

== Taxonomy ==
- Genus Albanerpeton Estes & Hoffstetter 1976
  - Albanerpeton arthridion Fox & Naylor 1982 Early Cretaceous, United States
  - Albanerpeton ektopistikon Carrano et al. 2022 Early Cretaceous, United States
  - Clade "Gracile-snouted"
    - Albanerpeton gracilis Gardner 2000 Late Cretaceous, North America
    - Albanerpeton cifellii Gardner 1999 Late Cretaceous, United States
    - Albanerpeton galaktion Fox & Naylor 1982 Late Cretaceous, North America
  - Clade "Robust-snouted"
    - Albanerpeton nexuosus Estes 1981 Late Cretaceous, North America
    - Albanerpeton pannonicus Venczel & Gardner 2005 latest Miocene-Early Pleistocene Hungary, Italy
    - Albanerpeton inexpectatum Estes & Hoffstetter 1976 Early Oligocene- Late Miocene, Europe
- Genus Anoualerpeton Gardner, Evans & Sigogneau-Russell 2003
  - Anoualerpeton priscus Gardner, Evans & Sigogneau-Russell 2003 Middle Jurassic, United Kingdom
  - Anoualerpeton unicus Gardner, Evans & Sigogneau-Russell 2003 Late Jurassic, Morocco
- Genus Celtedens McGowan & Evans 1995 Late Jurassic-Early Cretaceous, Europe
  - Celtedens megacephalus (Costa 1864) Early Cretaceous, Italy, United Kingdom
  - Celtedens ibericus McGowan & Evans 1995 Early Cretaceous, Spain
- Genus Nabia Guillaume et al., 2026 Late Jurassic, Europe
  - Nabia civiscientrix Guillaume et al., 2026 Late Jurassic, Portugal
- Genus Shirerpeton Matsumoto & Evans, 2018
  - Shirerpeton isajii Matsumoto & Evans, 2018 Early Cretaceous, Japan
- Genus Synorerpeton Guillaume et al., 2026 Late Cretaceous, Europe
  - Synorerpeton ribagorzana Guillaume et al., 2026 Late Cretaceous, Portugal
- Genus Wesserpeton Sweetman & Gardner 2013
  - Wesserpeton evansae Sweetman & Gardner 2013 Early Cretaceous, United Kingdom
- Genus Yaksha Daza et al, 2020
  - Yaksha perettii Daza et al, 2020 Late Cretaceous, Myanmar
- Fragmentary remains of albanerpetontids are also known from the Bathonian aged Anoual Formation of Morocco, the Bathonian aged Aveyron locality of France, the Tithonian aged Chassiron locality of France, the Berriasian aged Cherves-de-Cognac locality and Angeac-Charente bonebed of France, the Cenomanian-Turonian Khodzhakul and Bissekty Formations of Uzbekistan, originally assigned to the dubious genus Nukusurus and a variety of localities in Europe dating to the Late Cretaceous, including Hungary (Csehbánya Formation), France, Spain and Romania (Hațeg Island), which may be referrable to Albanerpeton.

=== Phylogeny ===
Guillaume et al. (2026) tested the relationships of albanerpetontids using the phylogenetic matrix they had published earlier that year accompanying the description of the Jurassic albanerpetontid Nabia from Portugal. Their new taxon Synorerpeton was recovered as the sister taxon to "Albanerpeton" galaktion, with these taxa nested within the polyphyletic genus Albanerpeton (sensu lato, in the broad sense). Species assigned to Albanerpeton span multiple continental landmasses from the Cretaceous through the Cenozoic, and several analyses have failed to support the monophyly of the genus (instead recovering other albanerpetontids, such as Yaksha or Shirerpeton, nested within it). As such, Guillaume and colleagues recommended restricting Albanerpeton (sensu stricto, in the strict sense) to the European, Cenozoic species A. inexpectatum and A. pannonicum, while other species should be revised and given new generic names. These results are displayed in the cladogram below:

- Albanerpetontidae
  - Anoualerpeton priscum
  - - - Anoualerpeton unicum
      - Purbeck Group species
    - - Nabia civiscientrix
      - - Wesserpeton evansae
        - - Celtedens ibericus
          - - Celtedens megacephalus
            - - Shirerpeton isajii
              - Albanerpeton (sensu lato)
                - "Albanerpeton" ektopistikon
                - - "Albanerpeton" arthridion
                  - - Sânpetru Formation species
                    - - "Albanerpeton" cifellii
                      - "Albanerpeton" gracilis
                      - - "Albanerpeton" galaktion
                        - Synorerpeton ribagorzana
                      - - Yaksha perettii
                        - Paskapoo Formation species
                        - - - "Albanerpeton" nexuosum
                            - "Albanerpeton" sp., cf. "A." nexuosum
                              (Cedar Mountain Formation)
                          - Albanerpeton (sensu stricto)
                            - Albanerpeton inexpectatum
                            - Albanerpeton pannonicum
