= Paskapoo Slopes =

Environmental and cultural feature in Calgary, Canada

- Stratigraphic range: Quaternary
- Type: Geological formation
- Underlies: Present erosional surface
- Overlies: Paskapoo Formation

Lithology
- Primary: Sandstone bedrock, colluvium, glaciolacustrine deposits, gravel, silt, clay

Location
- Coordinates: 51°04′29″N 114°11′54″W
- Region: Alberta
- Country: Canada

Type section
- Named for: Paskapoo, "blind man" in Cree, from Blindman River

The Paskapoo Slopes are a significant natural, environmental and cultural feature on the western side of Calgary, Alberta. They have a high visual impact and are a prominent landmark along the Trans Canada Highway, Calgary's western gateway from the Rockies.

The slopes include a set of six forested benches that were carved by Glacial Lake Calgary during the Pleistocene epoch, and they are incised by a series of twelve ravines. They rise up to 155 metres (510 ft) above the highway along the edge of the Paskapoo Escarpment and the Coach Hill Uplands.

== Location ==
The Paskapoo Slopes extend for four kilometres along the south side of the Trans Canada Highway from Sarcee Trail to the Coach Hill/Patterson Heights area of Calgary, and include Canada Olympic Park. To the east is the northern tip of Patterson Heights and Wilson Gardens, to the north is the community of Bowness and to the south and southwest is the Cougar Ridge and East Springbank III planning area.

== History ==
Lands abutting on and including sections of the Paskapoo Slopes were annexed by the City of Calgary from the Rocky View municipality in the 1950s. This included the area now known as Cougar Hills. The Strathcona area, including the northern portion known as Patterson Heights was annexed to the City in 1956 as part of a comprehensive annexation but planning was not initiated until the early 1970s and development did not occur until the 1980s. Patterson Heights was composed mainly of country residential acreages. The original C.F.C.N. Communications Ltd. radio and television broadcasting facility was developed in 1961 on Broadcast Hill, Patterson Heights with two later expansions. The Southwest Calgary communities of Coach Hill (est. 1979) and Patterson Heights (est. 1983) are abut the boundary of the Paskapoo Slopes. Coach Hills/Patterson Heights Community is bounded on the north and east by Sarcee Trail, the south by the Bow Trail Extension and on the West by 69 Street. The preservation of the Paskapoo north slope and escarpment in its natural state was already a concern of the West Bow Trail Coordinating Council in the 1970s.

The City of Calgary's Urban Park Master Plan (1994) called for a continuous integrated river valley system reflecting Calgary's unique prairie and foothills setting. The Plan recognised that unlike any other segment, Bow River West was characterized by its diversity, abundance and connectivity of natural vegetation and landforms that aims to reduce the environmental footprint of the river valleys' park system. This program protects key watershed areas and establishes extensive open space buffers along both the Bow and Elbow Rivers.

Ravines such as those of the Paskapoo Slopes are unique to Bow River West, and include springs that cut abruptly into the thick lake deposits that border the valley. Balsam poplar, which grows in moist valleys, thrives in the spring-fed ravines such as Paskapoo Slopes, Twelve Mile Coulee, Edworthy Park, and Valley Ridge, creating an environment that encourages significant wildlife movement and use. The map of the vision plan shows the Paskapoo Slopes to the east and west of Calgary Olympic Park keyed as "Preservation Parks"

The Enmax Parks Program (2007) funded through the Enmax Legacy Fund secured Paskapoo Slopes for a future park. This acquisition fit under the Calgary Urban Park Master Plan (1994).

=== Paskapoo Ski Hill and the 1988 Winter Olympics ===
The Trans Canada Highway was built in the mid-1950s creating a section of Paskapoo Slopes that was developed into Paskapoo Ski Hill (1957-1980s). Members of the University of Alberta Ski Team founded the Paskapoo Development Ltd. in 1960 to develop a ski hill on the Paskapoo Slopes. They opened the Paskapoo Ski Area to the public in 1960. It expanded to include a Go-Kart Track in 1979, a Golf Driving Range and used snow making machines. In 1981 Paskapoo hosted the World Cup Freestyle Event with 12,000 spectators.

The Paskapoo Ski Hill became the site of Canada Olympic Park (COP) which was the primary venue for ski jumping, bobsleigh, and luge during the 1988 Winter Olympics. COP is now operated by WinSport Canada formerly the Calgary Olympic Development Association (CODA). Canada Olympic Park's facilities are a key tourist attraction for Calgary. It continues to be used for high performance athletic training as well as recreational purposes by the general public. The park is in use year round with seasonal-based activities including downhill skiing, snowboarding, cross-country skiing and mountain biking. There are 25 km (16 mi) of bike trails). In 2000 the Calgary Olympic Development Association (CODA) purchased 219 acres on the Paskapoo Slopes adjacent to the Trans-Canada Highway and extends from the current COP boundaries to Sarcee Trail to preserve it for the recreational use of Calgarians and the training of Canadian athletes to come.

The City of Calgary had approved the Canada Olympic Park and Adjacent Lands Area Structure Plan, Bylaw 1P2005, on 13 June 2005 which applied to the area bounded by the Trans Canada Highway to the north, Sarcee Trail to the east, future Stoney Trail to the west and the community of Cougar Ridge to the south. At that time the Paskapoo Slopes were designated as Recreation (Nordic Slopes) Area.

== Geology ==
The bedrock beneath the Paskapoo Slopes and nearby Broadcast Hill and Nose Hill consists of hard sandstones that are part of the Paskapoo Formation. They were deposited during the Paleocene epoch approximately 62.5 to 58.5 million years ago, on a broad alluvial plain that extended eastward from the Canadian Rocky Mountains.

The Paskapoo Slopes themselves consist of unconsolidated glacial and pre-glacial sediments and colluvium that accumulated along the northern slopes of Broadcast Hill. During late Pleistocene time, they were sculpted into a series of six benches by the action of Glacial Lake Calgary, and erosion by springs and streams subsequently carved the twelve ravines that now cross them.

At the height of the Late Wisconsin Glacial Episode approximately 31,000-14,000 years ago, ice that was roughly a kilometre thick covered the area. Glacial Lake Calgary was the last of a series of short-lived, ice-dammed deep lakes that formed in the Calgary area as glaciation was drawing to a close and meltwater backed up behind the remnants of the Laurentide Ice Sheet and the glaciers that had arisen from the Rocky Mountains. The lake water lapped against the slopes of Broadcast Hill at Paskapoo Slopes, as well as at Nose Hill in what is now Nose Hill Park, forming the benches, while springs and streams began to carve the ravines and gullies. By about 16,000-17,000 years ago, the ice-dam to the east had melted and Glacial Lake Calgary was drained for the last time, leaving behind the complex topography that is visible today.

== Ecology ==
The City of Calgary's Park Development and Operations has identified large portions of Paskapoo Slopes as environmentally significant and has been extensively studying the area since 1991. See Environmental Reserve (ER) status below. The escarpment is characterised by an abundance of natural features including steep ravines and gullies, streams and springs, unique stands of aspen and balsam poplar, dense dogwood, riverine tall shrub communities, and a large glacial erratic (in the south- central portion of the ASP area). The slopes are also known to be habitat for deer, small mammals, and a large variety of migratory and breeding birds. The Paskapoo Slopes are comparable to the Nose Hill natural areas in terms of environmental significance.

== Biophysical Assessment of the Paskapoo Slopes ==
The Paskapoo Slopes escarpment is comparable to a major natural park, such as Bowmont Park, Nose Hill Park or Edworthy Park. Diversity of wildlife habitat, association of vegetation communities, frequent use by a number of wildlife species, and its role in maintaining viability of habitat beyond its boundaries are remarkable characteristics of the slopes.

== Archaeology ==
The oldest archaeological sites in the city of Calgary, dating back to about 8,500 radiocarbon years before present, occur on the Paskapoo Slopes of Broadcast Hill as well as in Tuscany, Downtown Calgary and Hawkwood.

In "pre-contact times, First Nation peoples used the area extensively as the high escarpment ridge offered unobstructed views of the Bow River Valley below and the prairies beyond. The river banks were used as winter camps."

As well, the steep cliffs provided ideal conditions for the buffalo jump, a unique method of hunting bison that is similar in complexity to the UNESCOWorld Heritage Site Head-Smashed-In Buffalo Jump. A baseline archaeological inventory and assessment was carried out in May and June 1997 of Pre-contact Native Archaeological sites in the East Paskapoo Slopes, including the Ripley Retreat on Ripley Ridge. This study investigated the Pre-contact Native Archaeological sites in the area. In total 49 sites were found ranging in type from kill/processing sites of buffalo to camps and sweat pits.

A Historical Resources Inventory and Assessment of both the East Springbank III and East Paskapoo Slopes planning areas was commissioned by The City of Calgary in the summer of 1998 concluding that the archaeological sites on record vary from local to high regional significance. The study identified a significant number of archaeological sites which are considered to be the northern extension of the Porcupine Hills/Oldman River basin pattern of bison driving, trapping and processing. The pattern, dating back over the past five thousand years or more, is characterized by the use of escarpments, slopes, benches and ravines for trapping and processing bison. The bison were gathered from the grazing lands in the uplands to the south and west and moved by a system of drive lanes to preferred killing and processing locales along Paskapoo Slopes. Archaeologist Brian O.K. linked the groups using the camp and kill sites along the Paskapoo slopes to the kill and processing sites along the Porcupine Hills further south in Alberta. The kill sites on the Paskapoo slopes, which Reeves counts at a minimum of 39 on the side of the Olympic Park alone, are less intensively used than sites in the Porcupine Hills such as the Old Woman's Buffalo Jump, but are more numerous and spatially dispersed. The main differences observed at the Paskapoo Slopes is primarily that the bison driving and processing is spread out laterally and vertically along the slopes and, although intensive, it is spread over 2 km of slope.

Because of its Pre-Contact context, Paskapoo Slopes vary from local to regional and provincial significance. In 2005 Brian Vivian and his team uncovered two Proto-Historic bison processing/kill sites that indicate a spring located on the NW corner of the Paskapoo Escarpment was used as a location to hunt bison for almost 4000 years.

== Protection, preservation, enhancement of Paskapoo Slopes Environmental Reserve ==
The Paskapoo Slopes Preservation Society was founded by Hugh Magill in 1993 to preserve the park and to protect the environmentally sensitive escarpment as well as significant archeological sites – including the historic buffalo jump.

The City of Calgary Parks and Recreation Department is developing a management plan for the Paskapoo Slopes Natural Environment Park. By the fall of 2008 a draft version of the natural park vision was shared with the working group membership.

Paskapoo Slopes Park is designated as Environmental Reserve (ER) which is the legal term referring to land designated as environmental reserve by a subdivision authority or a municipality under Division 8. As such the area of the Paskapoo Slopes designated as an Environmental Reserve (ER) must be "left in its natural state or be used as a public park." Jason Unger of the Environmental Law Centre of Edmonton, Alberta explains how the designation Environmental Reserves (ER) allows municipalities to use this preservation and planning tool for environment protection of dedicated lands.

=== Encroachments into Paskapoo Slopes ===
Increasing competition for use of the Paskapoo Slopes land highlights the need for protection of the Environmental Reserve (ER). The City of Calgary has undertaken a number of studies out of concerns about encroachments into the Paskapoo Slopes. The expansions of existing residential neighbourhoods such as Coach Hill/Patterson Heights, and the construction of new developments such as Crestmont (Rocky View), East Springbank III, Cougar Hill along with WinSport's proposal for further development of the COP area.

==== Canada Olympic Park Masterplan (2010) ====
The Canada Olympic Park Masterplan (2010-01)proposed to dedicate 164 acres of Paskapoo Slopes to City of Calgary ownership which combined with contiguous lands already acquired by the City would result in an exceptional Paskapoo Slopes Park and Trails system and open space for all Calgarians. Of the Paskapoo Slopes area considered for development c. 21.89 acres may be considered Environmental Reserve (ER) are being proposed for development. The plan would preserve 113.5 acres of Environmental Reserve (ER) land. The application was approved, with changes, by the Calgary Planning Commission on Sept 15th, 2011.

The Land Use and Outline Plan proposed to integrate the Paskapoo Slopes into the existing open space network. Development within the plan area would be integrated with the escarpment so that insofar as possible and practical ravines, watercourses and other important features would be conserved, the impact of the built form on natural areas would be minimized, wildlife would be protected and land disturbance would be mitigated. Notably, lands with the highest environmental significance would be, whenever possible, retained in a natural state.

However, Hugh Magill of the Paskapoo Slopes Preservation Society who applauded WinSport's initial proposals argues that the new plan encroaches higher up on the slopes and involves paving more of the lower lands.

==== Patterson Heights ====
Patterson Woods, owned by Calgary Development Corporation, is in the northeast of Paskapoo Slopes and is part of a corridor connecting the slopes to Edworthy Park. Although construction was delayed by Alderman Dave Bronconnier in 1999, construction continued and some bone sites have been lost.

By 2006 City of Calgary requested the protection of large and continuous blocks of treed land on the Paskapoo Slopes contiguous with Patterson Point which would be dedicated to the City as Municipal Reserve (MR) thereby limiting development. The Patterson Point Development plan area, part of Patterson Heights Community, bounded by the closed road allowances of Patrick Street SW and Patrick Avenue SW included a section of the Paskapoo Slopes which sloped downward from the southwest corner and then increased in steepness. The steeper slopes with elevations of 1229 m and 1192 m were designated as Environmental Reserve (ER) areas.

"A two days assessment was conducted by Historical Resource Management Ltd. in 2007. The property located within the East Paskapoo Slopes area has a high impact potential unknown to historical resources. Findings show, there is one known archaeological site within the proposed development area. This camp and bison kill site located on a ledge on a north-facing side slope of the property, extends for about 240m along the valley edge above Patterson Boulevard, achieving a 150m by about 60m area. The findings in this site consist of faunal remains recovered in nine (9) out of twenty two (22) tests, and no lithic debitage or fire broken rock. All positive tests are located within the area that will not be disturbed by the proposed development. This site location is outlined on the Plan."CPC

==== West Springs/Cougar Ridge ====
The Paskapoo Slopes is an integral part of the West Springs and Cougar Ridge Communities valued by the community for its significant ecological and historical resources.

Cougar Ridge development included storm-water sewer and sanitary sewer lines that run down and across the Paskapoo Slopes and its major ravines fragmenting the natural area. During the fall of 2000, an extensive archaeological study was performed on the significant sites located along the storm and sanitary utility corridor for the Cougar Ridge Community. This trunk now runs down the Paskapoo Slopes. Before it was installed, these digs were completed

The Cougar Ridge residential development project above the proposed Paskapoo Slopes Park, will provide a parking lot for the park in the future. There is a Municipal Reserve (MR) area with a local pathway linking into the Paskapoo Slopes park.

Cougar Ridge Naturalized Park which is part of Paskapoo Slopes is designated as Municipal Reserve (MR) and Environmental Reserve (ER) and as such natural grasses, shrubs and trees were planted c. 2002 throughout.
