= Adolf Peretti =

Swiss gemologist and mineralogist

- Born: 1957 (age 68–69); Switzerland
- Education: Doctor of Philosophy
- Alma mater: University of Zurich; ETH Zurich (Swiss Federal Institute of Technology)
- Occupations: Gemologist; mineralogist
- Title: CEO of GRS Gemresearch Swisslab

Adolf Peretti (born 1957) is a Swiss gemologist, mineralogist, and collector of minerals, amber, and fossils. He discovered the eponymously named mineral Perettiite-(Y) and the holotype specimen of the prehistoric amphibian species Yaksha perettii, making Peretti the only living person to have both an animal and a mineral named after him. Perettiite is also the name of a mineral group comprising Perettiite-(Y) and Badakhshanite-(Y).

== Early life and education ==
Adolf Peretti was born in Switzerland in 1957. He and his twin brother were raised in Cazis and Chur, in Grisons. Peretti began collecting minerals in his youth, accompanying his father on trips to mountains and rivers and using a small hammer to break stones. In the sixth grade, his teachers asked him to exhibit his collection of quartz from Calanda. In 1979, he was recognized by the Swiss Youth Research Foundation (SJf) for his work on minerals in the shist lustre of the Grisons.

Peretti attended the University of Zurich and ETH Zurich (Swiss Federal Institute of Technology), where he was awarded the title Doctor of Sciences (Dr. sc. ETH Zurich). His field research was focused on the areas of the Forno Glacier, Grisons, and the Muretto Pass, and he visited Puschlav and Valtellina Malenco (Italy) to study ore formations in serpentine minerals for his doctorate. He received scholarships from the Swiss National Science Foundation in 1983 and 1985. The European Federation of Geologists awarded him the title EurGeol on September 7, 2000.

== Career ==
Peretti is a gemologist, mineralogist, and researcher who collects amber and fossils. He discovered the mineral Perettiite-(Y) in Momeik, Myanmar, as well as the prehistoric amphibian species Yaksha perettii (which are named after him) and two new species of lizards. He and other scientists identified the new mineral pezzottaite

In 2023, he was the only living person to have both an animal and a mineral named after him. Peretti was also involved discovery of the specimen of extinct lizard species Oculudentavis naga, and was among the authors of the papers describing the lizard species Retinosaurus hkamtiensis and Electroscincus zedi.

Peretti heads GRS laboratories, including GRS GemResearch Swisslab AG, GRS (Thailand) Co., Ltd., GRS Lab USA LLC, GRS Lab (Paris) SAS and GRS Lab (Hong Kong) Limited, private laboratories that specialize in determining the origins and treatment of gems and precious stones. In 2020, he founded and continues to serve as director of the Dr Peretti Museum Foundation, a nonprofit organization in Meggen that showcases Peretti's collection of approximately 2,000 fossils, gems, and minerals, including the holotypes of the lizards Retinosaurus hkamtiensis, Oculudentavis naga, Electroscincus zedi, and the amphibian Yaksha perettii, (all of which originate from amber found in different mining areas in Myanmar, including Burmese amber from the Hukawng Valley) and minerals such as pezzottaite, painite, johachidolite, and Perettiite-(Y).

Research on Burmese amber has attracted controversy due to the involvement of the Burmese army and (historically) armed rebel groups like the Kachin Independence Army in its procurement. Peretti has defended collecting Burmese amber in contrast to groups like the Society of Vertebrate Paleontology who have called for a partial moratorium on research on amber collected after 2017 (when the Burmese army took control of the area containing the amber mines), arguing that the amber production collapsed after the Burmese army took over the area, the profits obtained by the Burmese army and rebel groups from amber are limited, and that restrictions only hurt the local miners. However, Peretti has warned that his assessment was made before the ongoing military coup and the recent conflicts with civil society that have emerged since 2021. He emphasizes that significant future developments in internally displaced persons (IDP) camps and mines will likely need careful monitoring.

== See also ==
- List of ETH Zurich people
- List of mineralogists
