= Yaksha perettii =

Yaksha perettii Temporal range: Early Cenomanian 99 Ma
- Holotype skull of Yaksha perettii, dark grey represents preserved soft tissue

Scientific classification
- Kingdom: Animalia
- Phylum: Chordata
- Class: Amphibia
- Order: †Allocaudata
- Family: †Albanerpetontidae
- Genus: †Yaksha; Daza et al., 2020
- Species: †Y. perettii

Binomial name
- †Yaksha perettii Daza et al., 2020

Extinct species of amphibian

Yaksha perettii is an extinct species of albanerpetontid amphibian, and the only species in the genus Yaksha. It is known from three specimens found in Cenomanian aged Burmese amber from Myanmar. The remains of Yaksha perettii are the best preserved of all albanerpetontids, which usually consist of isolated fragments or flattened skeletons, and have provided significant insights in the morphology and lifestyle of the group.

== Etymology ==
The generic epithet is named after the Yaksha, a class of nature and guardian spirits in Indian religions, while the specific epithet honors Dr. Adolf Peretti, who provided some of the specimens, including the holotype.

== Discovery ==
The paratype specimen was originally described in 2016 amongst a collection of fossil lizard species from Burmese amber, and was initially identified as a stem-chameleon. However Professor Susan E. Evans, a researcher who has extensively worked on albanerpetontids, recognised the specimen as belonging to the group. Subsequently, another specimen was discovered in the collection of gemologist Dr. Adolf Peretti, which would later become the holotype specimen. The paper describing Yaksha perettii was published in November 2020 in the journal Science.

== Description ==
Bones with labels

The species is known from three specimens, the small juvenile skeleton described in the 2016 paper (JZC Bu154), a complete adult skull and lower jaws (GRS-Ref-060829), and a partial adult postcranium (GRSRef-27746). The adult skull is 12.18 millimetres (0.480 in) from front to back, with an estimated snout to pelvis length of around 5 centimetres (2.0 in). The adult skull was found with an associated hyoid entoglossal process, a long, rod like bone situated in the oral cavity, which was embedded in remnant tongue tissue. An analogous bone exists in chameleons, which enables rapid ballistic propulsion of the tongue for feeding. The two structures evolved separately by convergent evolution.

Ballistic feeding in a chameleon; albanerpetontids like Yaksha probably fed in similar fashion

== Phylogeny ==
Yaksha perettii was found to be in a derived position within Albanerpetontidae, similar to Shirerpeton, nested between the Early Cretaceous and Late Cretaceous-Cenozoic species of Albanerpeton.

- - Anoualerpeton
  - - Celtedens
    - - Uña taxon
      - - Wesserpeton
        - - Albanerpeton arthridion
          - - Albanerpeton gracilis + Albanerpeton galaktion
            - - Albanerpeton cifellii
              - - Yaksha
                - - Shirerpeton
                  - - Albanerpeton nexuosum
                    - - Albanerpeton pannonicum
                      - - Paskapoo sp
                        - Albanerpeton inexpectatum
