= Perettiite-(Y) =

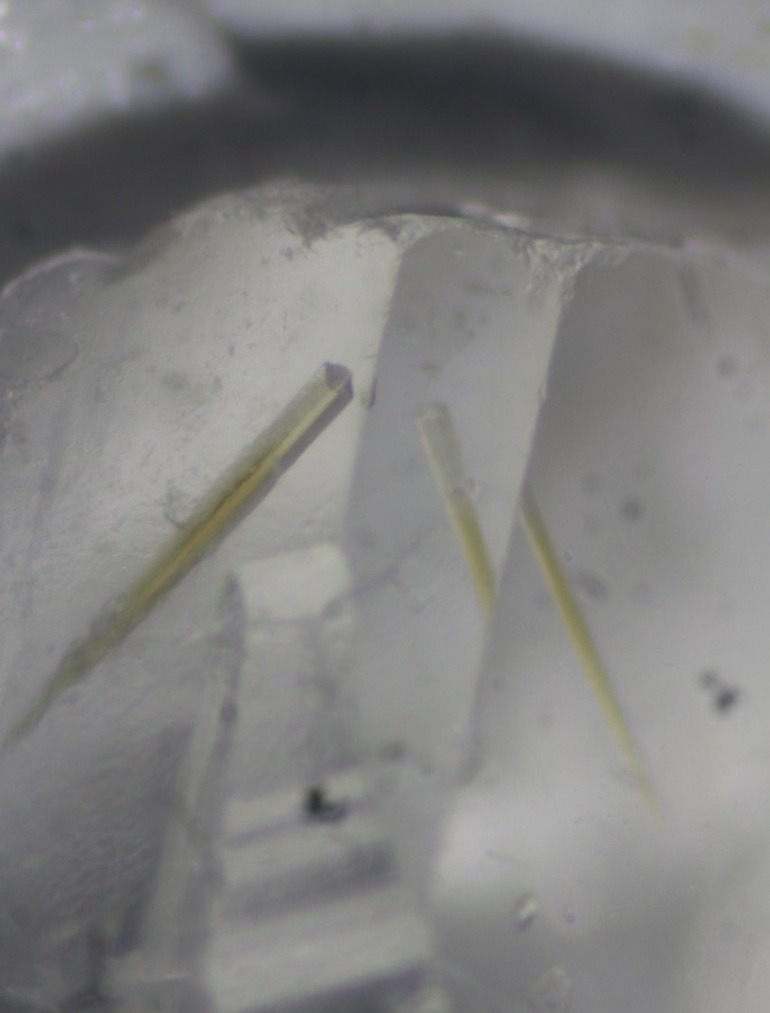
- Perettiite inclusion in phenakite

General
- Category: Silicate mineral
- Formula: Y_{2}Mn_{4}FeSi_{2}B_{8}O_{24}
- IMA symbol: Ptt-Y
- Crystal system: Orthorhombic
- Crystal class: Dipyramidal (mmm); H-M symbol: (2/m 2/m 2/m)
- Space group: Pmna
- Unit cell: a = 12.8252(5) Å, b = 4.6187(2) Å, c = 12.8252(5) Å; Z = 2

Identification
- Crystal habit: Microscopic inclusion
- Cleavage: (010)
- Mohs scale hardness: 7
- Specific gravity: 4.533

Perettiite-(Y) is a complex silicate–borate mineral with the formula Y_{2}Mn_{4}FeSi_{2}B_{8}O_{24}. It was first discovered in 2015 by Adolf Peretti of the Gemresearch Swisslab (GRS). It was found as inclusions in a phenakite crystal from Mogok, Myanmar.

Perettiite-(Y) was approved for IMA (International Mineralogical Association) status in 2015.

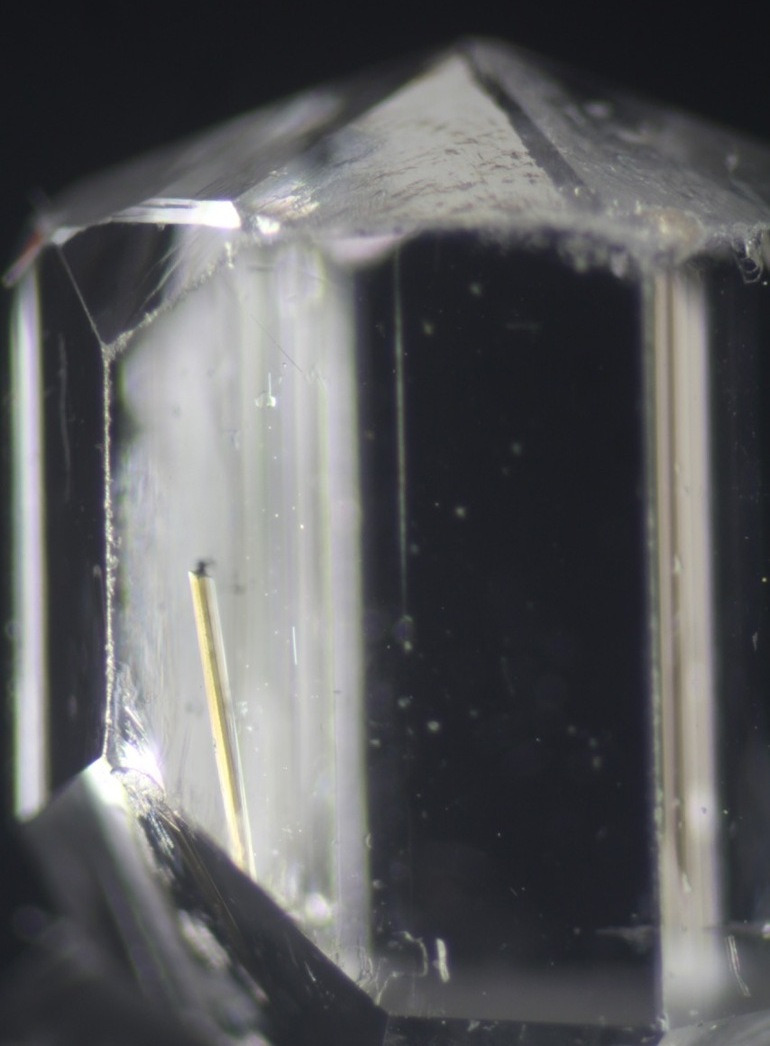
Perettiite inclusion in a phenakite crystal
