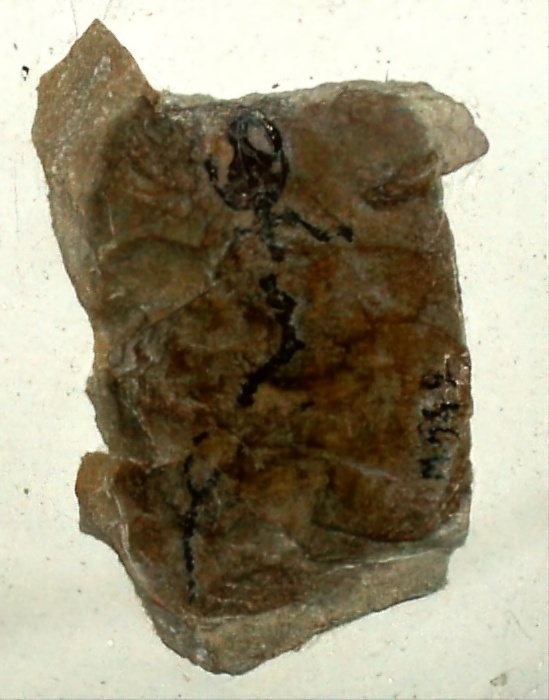
- Fossil of Celtedens megacephalus
- Holotype specimen of Celtedens ibericus

Scientific classification
- Kingdom: Animalia
- Phylum: Chordata
- Class: Amphibia
- Order: †Allocaudata
- Family: †Albanerpetontidae
- Genus: †Celtedens; McGowan and Evans, 1995

Species
- †C. megacephalus (Costa, 1864 originallyTriton megacephalus) (type); †C. ibericus McGowan and Evans, 1995

= Celtedens =

Celtedens Temporal range: Late Jurassic–Early Cretaceous

Extinct genus of amphibians

Celtedens is an extinct genus of albanerpetontid amphibian from the Early Cretaceous of England, Spain, Sweden and Italy, and the Late Jurassic of Portugal.

== Taxonomy ==
- †Celtedens ibericus McGowan and Evans 1995 La Huérguina Formation, Spain, Barremian
- †Celtedens megacephalus Costa 1864 Lulworth Formation, United Kingdom, Berriasian Pietraroja Plattenkalk, Italy, Albian
- Indeterminate remains attributed to the genus are also known from the Late Jurassic Alcobaça Formation and Lourinhã Formation of Portugal, as well as the earliest Cretaceous (Berriasian) of Sweden.

== Phylogeny ==
From Daza et al. 2020.

- - Anoualerpeton
  - - Celtedens
    - - Uña taxon
      - - Wesserpeton
        - - Albanerpeton arthridion
          - - Albanerpeton gracilis + Albanerpeton galaktion
            - - Albanerpeton cifellii
              - - Yaksha
                - - Shirerpeton
                  - - Albanerpeton nexuosum
                    - - Albanerpeton pannonicum
                      - - Paskapoo sp
                        - Albanerpeton inexpectatum
