= Blindman River =

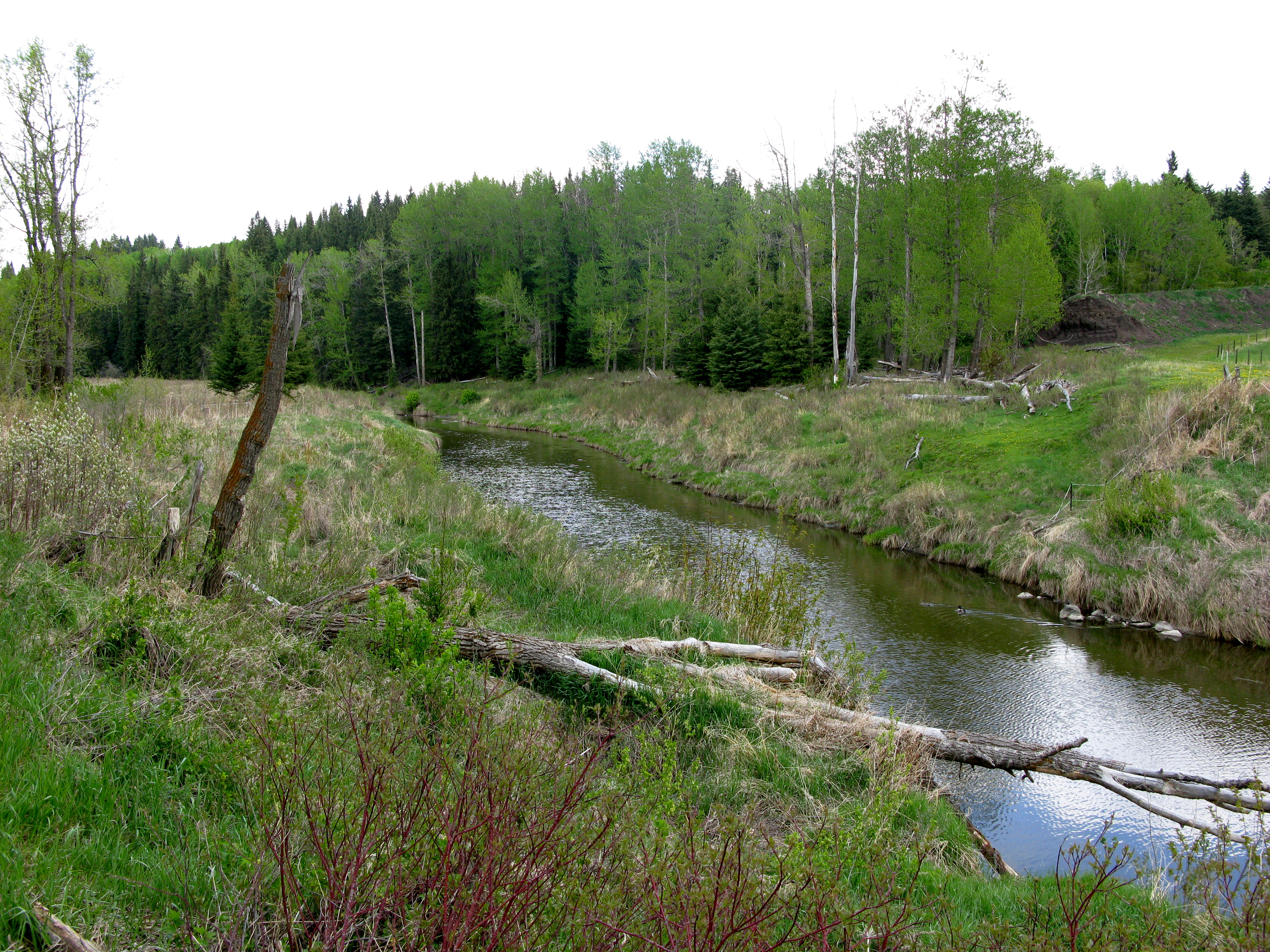
- Blindman River, near Rimbey, Alberta

Location
- Country: Canada
- Province: Alberta

Physical characteristics
- Source
  - location: Medicine Lake Provincial Grazing Reserve
  - coordinates: 52°53′13″N 114°34′39″W
  - elevation: 1,003 m (3,291 ft)
- Mouth
  - location: Red Deer River
  - coordinates: 52°21′17″N 113°45′26″W
  - elevation: 859 m (2,818 ft)

The Blindman River is in central Alberta. It forms south of Winfield and flows southeastward before joining the Red Deer River near Red Deer. The Blindman is bridged by Alberta Highway 20 a number of times in its upper reaches, before passing near the town of Rimbey. The river then takes on the outflow of Gull Lake. It is bridged by Alberta Highway 2 at Red Deer before flowing into the Red Deer River.

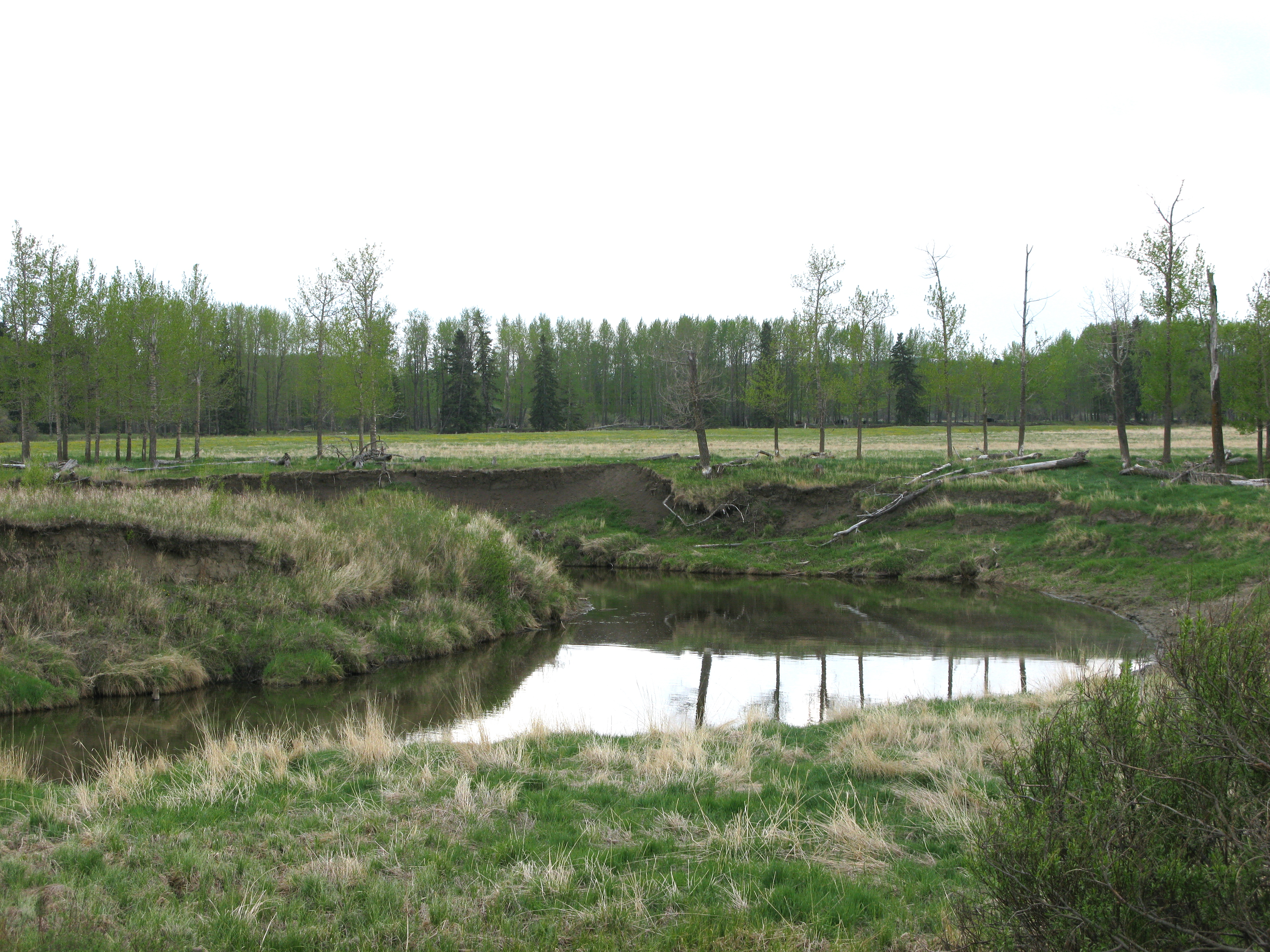
The river near Rimbey, Alberta

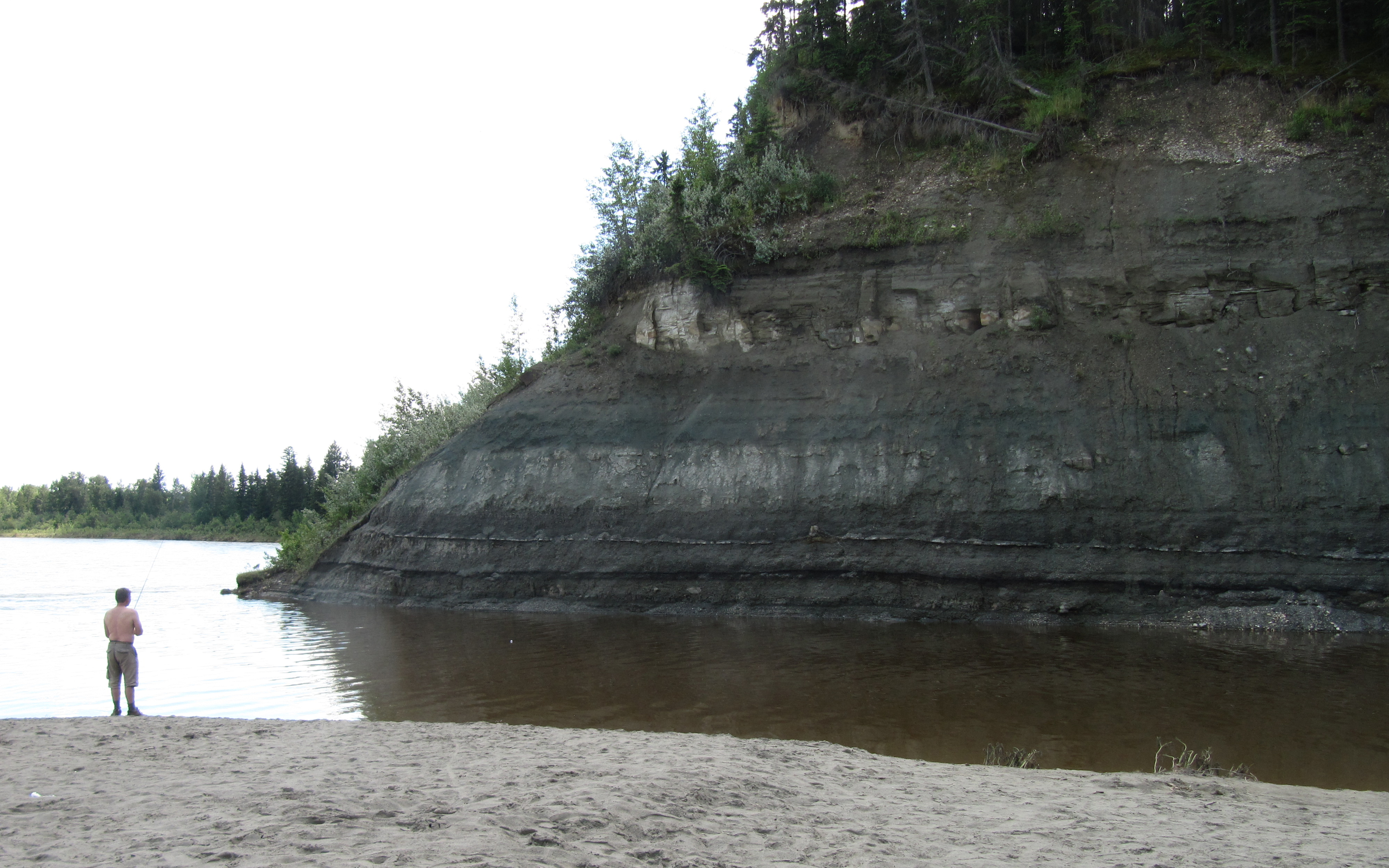
The Blindman River is deeply incised into Paskapoo Formation bedrock at its confluence with the Red Deer River.

There are two competing theories regarding the name of the river. One theory suggests a Cree hunting party became snowblind while travelling and had to rest on the river banks until their eyes healed. The hunting party applied the name paskapiw to the river, which translates as 'He is blind'. The second theory argues that Blindman is a descriptive term, applied to the river because of its numerous meanders and curves.

The Paskapoo Formation, first described in its banks, takes its name from the Plains Cree name for the Blindman.

== Tributaries ==
- Anderson Creek
- Lloyd Creek
- Boyd Creek
- Potter Creek
- Gull Lake

== See also ==
- List of Alberta rivers
