= Nabia civiscientrix =

Nabia civiscientrix Temporal range: Late Jurassic

Scientific classification
- Kingdom: Animalia
- Phylum: Chordata
- Class: Amphibia
- Order: †Allocaudata
- Family: †Albanerpetontidae
- Genus: †Nabia; Guillaume et al., 2026
- Species: †N. civiscientrix

Binomial name
- †Nabia civiscientrix Guillaume et al., 2026

Extinct genus of amphibian

Nabia is an extinct monotypic genus of albanerpetontid amphibian that lived in what is now Portugal during Late Jurassic epoch. Its remains have been found in Alcobaça Formation and the Lourinhã Formation. The generic name Nabia derives from Nabia, a goddess of rivers in Lusitanian mythology. The specific epithet of the type species, Nabia civiscientrix, translates to 'she who practices citizen science' referencing "Citizen Science project MicroSaurus, through which most of the specimens were found".
