= Paskapoo Formation =

Stratigraphic unit in Western Canada

- Stratigraphic range: Paleocene
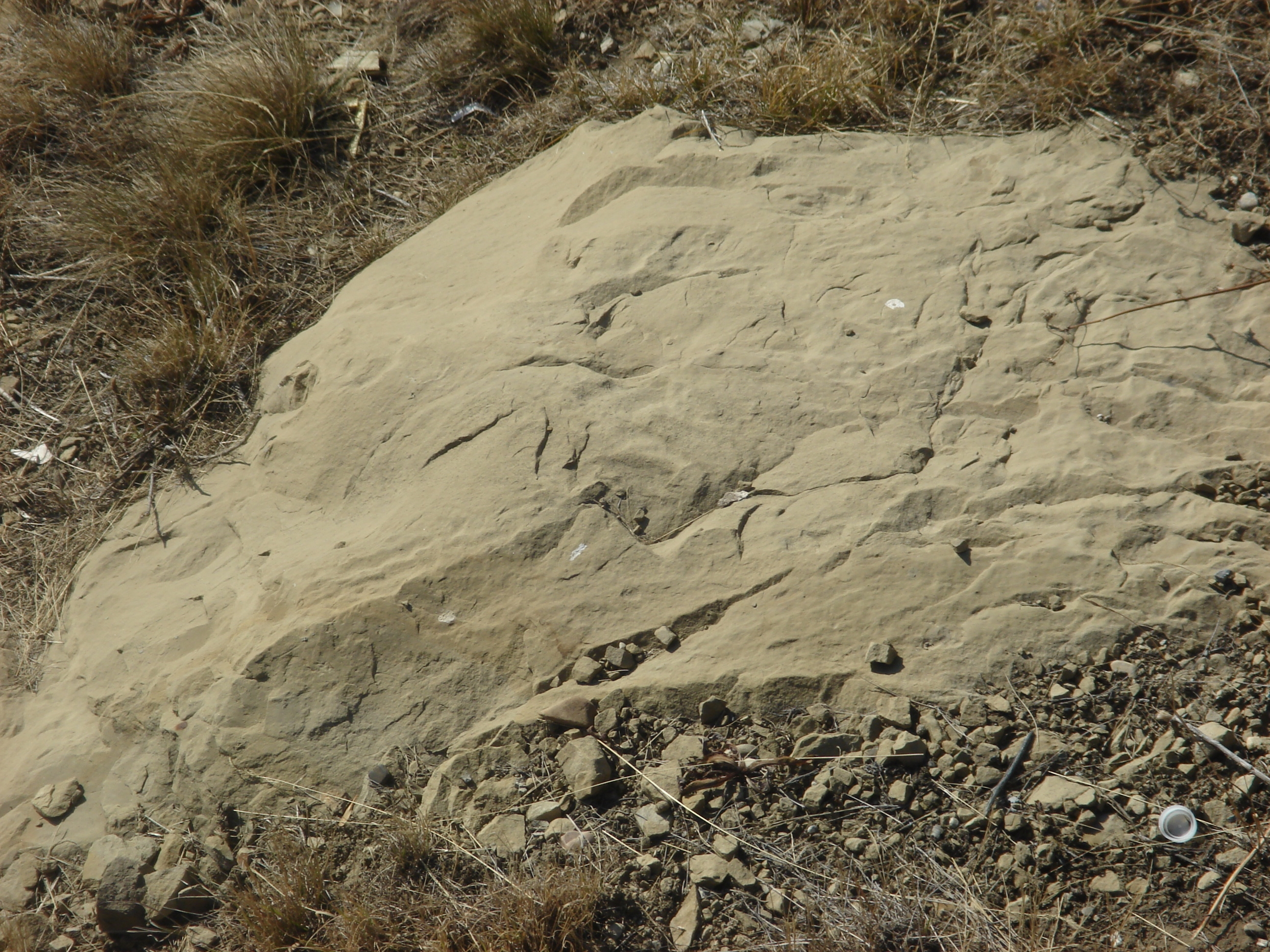
- Outcrop of Paskapoo sandstone in Calgary
- Type: Geological formation
- Underlies: Tertiary gravel, Quaternary sediments, present erosional surface
- Overlies: Scollard Formation, Coalspur Formation
- Thickness: up to 600 metres (1,970 ft)

Lithology
- Primary: Mudstone, siltstone, sandstone
- Other: Conglomerate, coal

Location
- Coordinates: 52.355031°N 113.757797°W
- Region: Alberta
- Country: Canada

Type section
- Named for: Cree: paskapiw, lit. 'He is blind', from Blindman River
- Named by: J.B. Tyrrell, 1887

The Paskapoo Formation is a stratigraphic unit of Middle to Late Paleocene age in the Western Canada Sedimentary Basin. The Paskapoo underlies much of southwestern Alberta, and takes the name from the Blindman River (paskapiw means 'He is blind' in Cree). It was first described from outcrops along that river, near its confluence with the Red Deer River north of the city of Red Deer, by Joseph Tyrrell in 1887. It is important for its freshwater aquifers, its coal resources, and its fossil record, as well as having been the source of sandstone for the construction of fire-resistant buildings in Calgary during the early 1900s.

== Lithology and environment of deposition ==
The Paskapoo Formation is of fluvial origin and consists primarily of sandstones, siltstones and mudstones, with lesser amounts of pebble-conglomerate and coal, and minor bentonite. The sediments were derived from the Canadian Cordillera during tectonic uplift and erosion in the late stages of the Laramide Orogeny. They were transported eastward by river systems and deposited in fluvial and floodplain environments.

The sandstones were deposited in river channels. They are cross-bedded, medium- to coarse-grained, and locally conglomeratic. The siltstones and mudstones represent crevasse splay, overbank and shallow pond environments. They include plant fossils, rooted horizons and paleosols. Carbonaceous mudstones and coaly beds that represent oxygen-poor, swampy settings are thin and discontinuous, but common. Thick coal seams that formed in well-developed swamps are present only in the youngest portion of the formation, which is preserved near Hinton.

== Stratigraphy ==
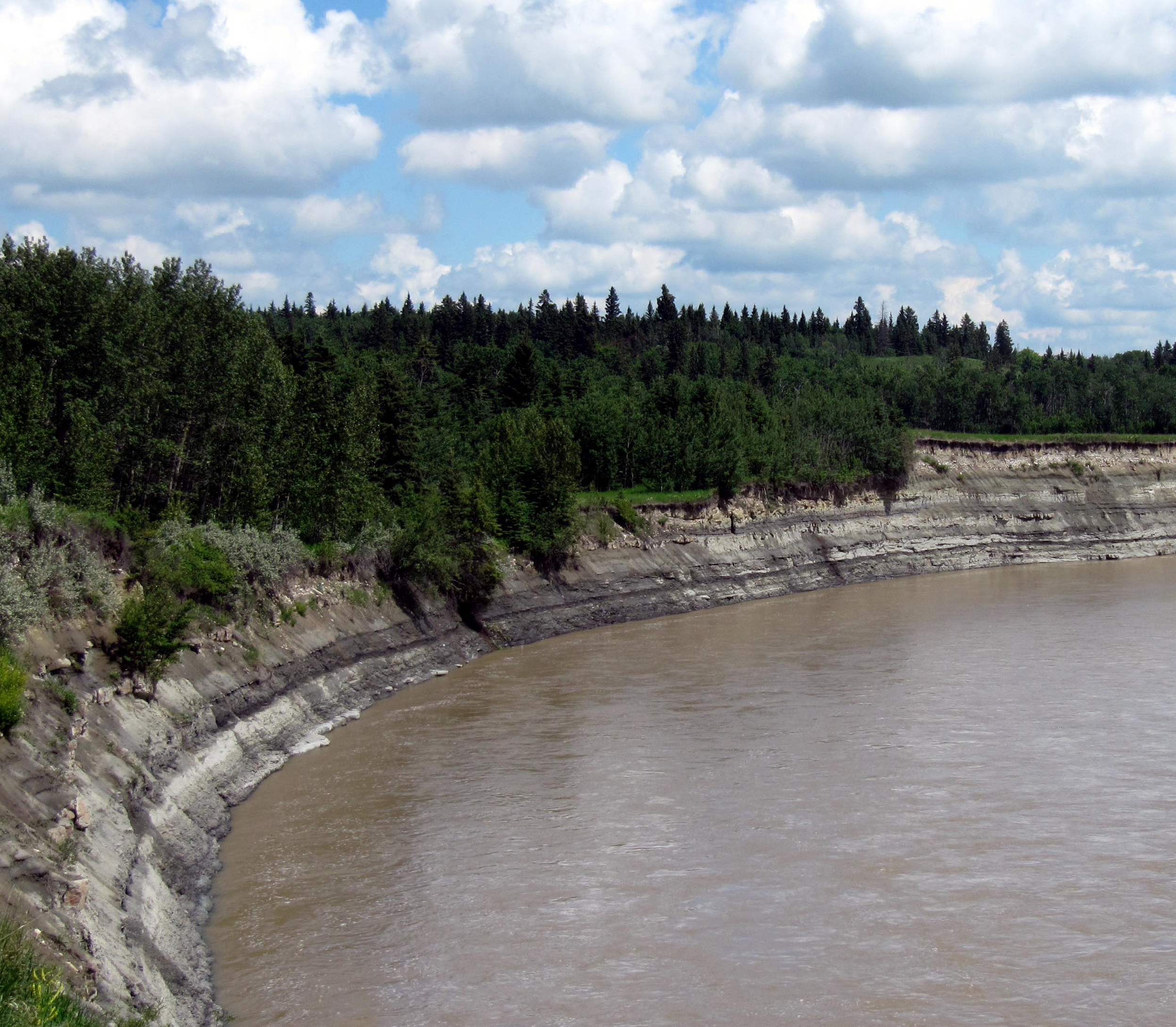
Mudstones and siltstones of the Paskapoo Formation exposed along the Red Deer River, downstream from its confluence with the Blindman River

Although some early workers included the underlying Scollard Formation as the lower part of the Paskapoo, the two are now treated separately. The base of the Paskapoo Formation, designated the Haynes Member, consists primarily of cliff-forming sandstones and pebble-conglomerates, interbedded with lesser amounts of siltstone and mudstone. In the overlying Lacombe Member, siltstones and mudstones are dominant, with interbeds of fine-grained sandstone, carbonaceous mudstones, paleosols, and thin coals. The Dalehurst Member at the top of the formation consists of the Obed coal zone. The Dalehurst strata are similar to those of the Lacombe Member, but the Dalehurst sequence includes up to six coal seams, with individual seams up to 5 metres (20 ft) thick.

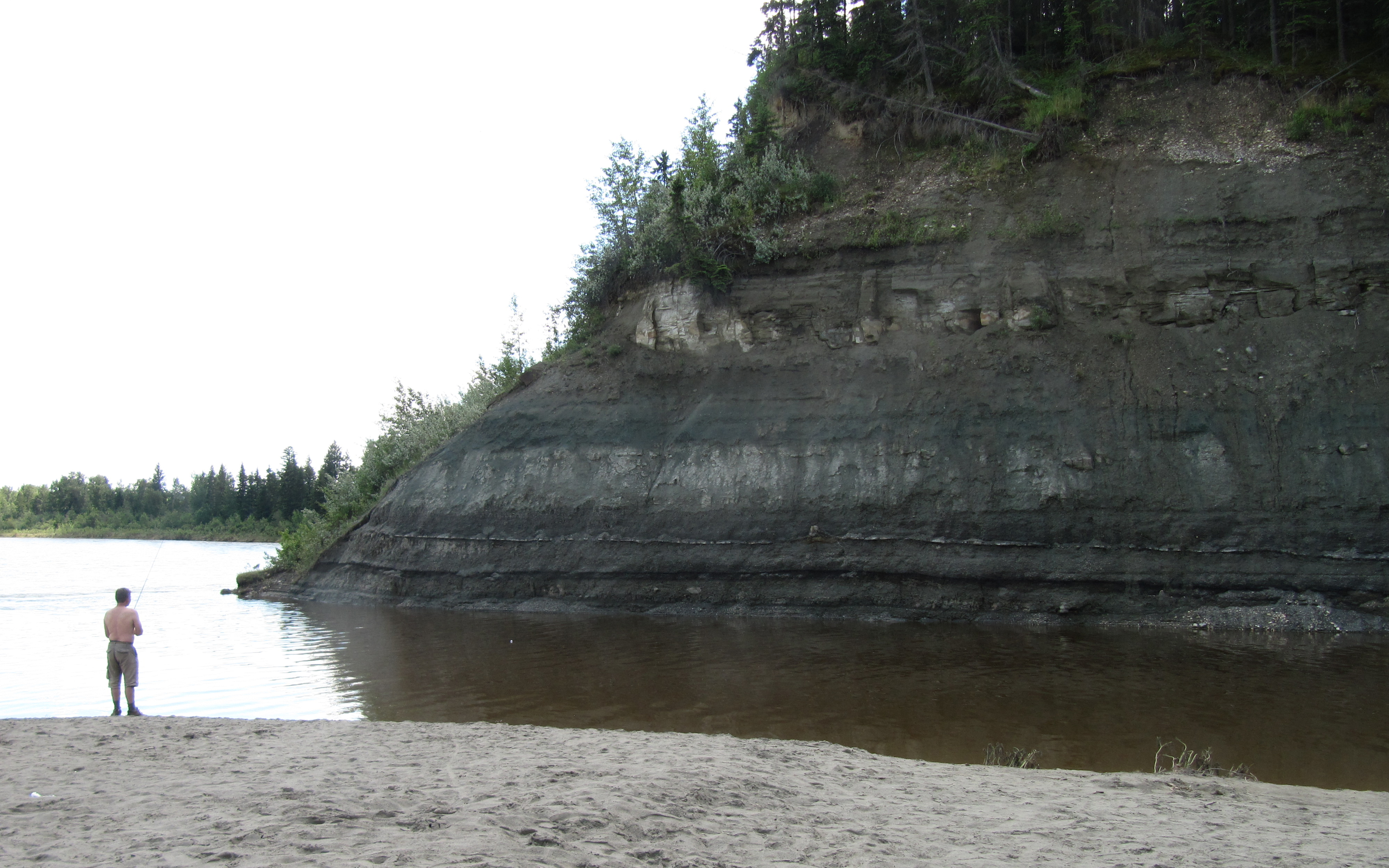
The Blindman River is deeply incised into Paskapoo Formation bedrock at its confluence with the Red Deer River.

=== Distribution ===
The Paskapoo Formation underlies much of southwestern Alberta. It is thickest in the foothills of the Canadian Rockies, and thins eastward to the 112th meridian west in the plains. The formation is more than 750 metres (2,460 ft) thick in the foothills, and about 600 metres (1,970 ft) near Calgary. It is assumed that it originally reached thicknesses as great as 1,000 metres (3,280 ft) in some areas prior to erosion.

The formation is exposed at the surface along a trend that extends from Calgary to west of Edmonton. Good outcrops are present in the eastern reaches of the foothills, and along the Bow River in and around Calgary (for example at Paskapoo Slopes), the Red Deer River near Red Deer, the North Saskatchewan River west of Edmonton, and the Athabasca River. The Dalehurst Member is an erosional remnant and is confined to an area adjacent to the foothills near Hinton and Obed.

=== Relationship to other units ===
The Paskapoo Formation underlies the present-day erosional surface and it is exposed in outcrop in many areas. Cover, where present, consists of Quaternary sediments or, on a few localized plateaus, of younger Tertiary gravels.

The Paskapoo rests on the Scollard Formation in the Alberta plains, and on the equivalent Coalspur Formation in the Alberta foothills. The lower boundary has been defined as the erosional base of the first prominent sandstone above the Ardley coal zone of the Scollard Formation. It has been established that, in the type area near Red Deer, this erosional surface represents a hiatus of about 1–2 million years. In the foothills, the contact with the underlying Coalspur Formation is less distinctive but is again placed at the base of the first dominantly sandstone unit overlying a dominantly coal and mudstone unit.

The Paskapoo grades into the equivalent Porcupine Hills Formation south of Calgary. It is correlated with upper part of the Ravenscrag Formation of southern Saskatchewan and the Fort Union Formation of Montana and North Dakota, which are not contiguous with it but are of similar age.

=== Age ===
The middle to late Paleocene age of the Paskapoo Formation is based primarily on Paskapoo mammal fossils, which indicate North American land mammal ages of middle to late Tiffanian. It is supported by detailed palynostratigraphic and magnetostratigraphic studies. It is equivalent to a radiometric age of approximately 62.5 to 58.5 million years.

== Paleoflora ==
Macginitiea nobilis leaf from near Red Deer

Plant fossils were first collected from the Paskapoo Formation by Tyrrell in 1886, and since that time a wide variety have been described. These include specimens of the ferns Azolla, Onoclea, and Speirseopteris; the conifers Metasequoia (including Metasequoia foxii) and Glyptostrobus; and the dicots Palaeocarpinus (a member of the birch family), Cercidiphyllum (including Joffrea), Macginitiea, and Beringiaphyllum (a relative of dogwoods).

== Paleobiota ==
=== Multituberculates ===
Ptilodus, Parectypodus, Mesodma, Cimolodon, Stygimys, Catopsalis, Meniscoessus, Cimolomys, and Cimexomys

=== Plesiadapiforms ===
Plesiadapis, Nannodectes, Pronothodectes, Ignacius, Elphidotarsius, Carpodaptes, Picrodus, Palaechthon, Torrejonia, Micromomys, Saxonella, Paromomys, and Edworthia

=== Condylarths ===
Chriacus, Ectocion, Meniscotherium, Protungulatum, Oxyprimus, Promioclaenus, and Goniocodon

=== Pantodonts ===
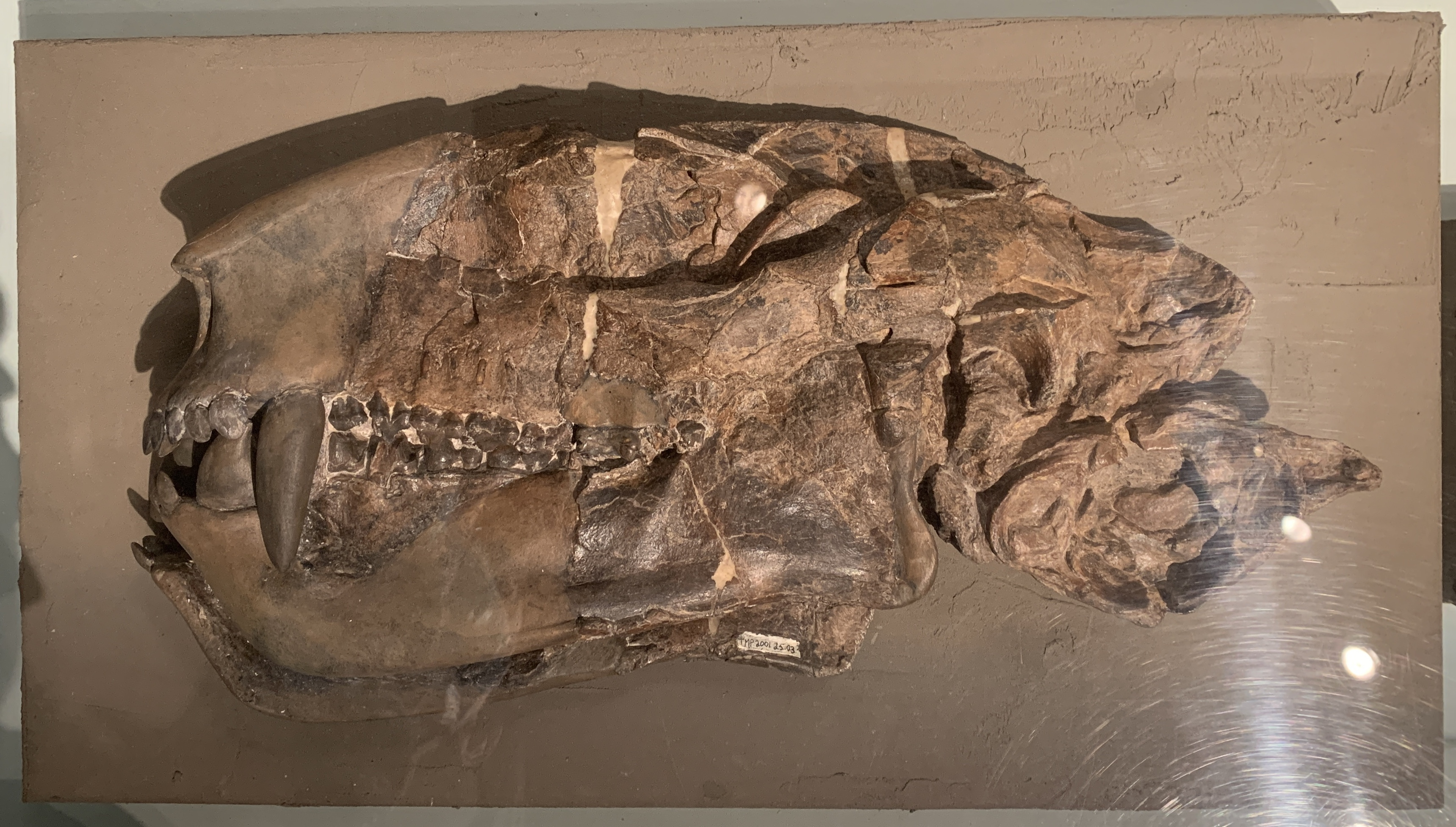
Undescribed pantodont species

Pantolambda

=== Carnivora ===
Diacodon, Bisonalveus, Bryanictis, Aphronorus, Eudaemonema, and Elpidophorus

=== Pholidontomorpha ===
Melaniella

=== Champsosaurs ===
Champsosaurus

=== Crocodilians ===
Leidyosuchus

=== Turtles ===
Nilssonia and Trionyx

=== Amphibians ===
Albanerpeton

=== Bony fish ===
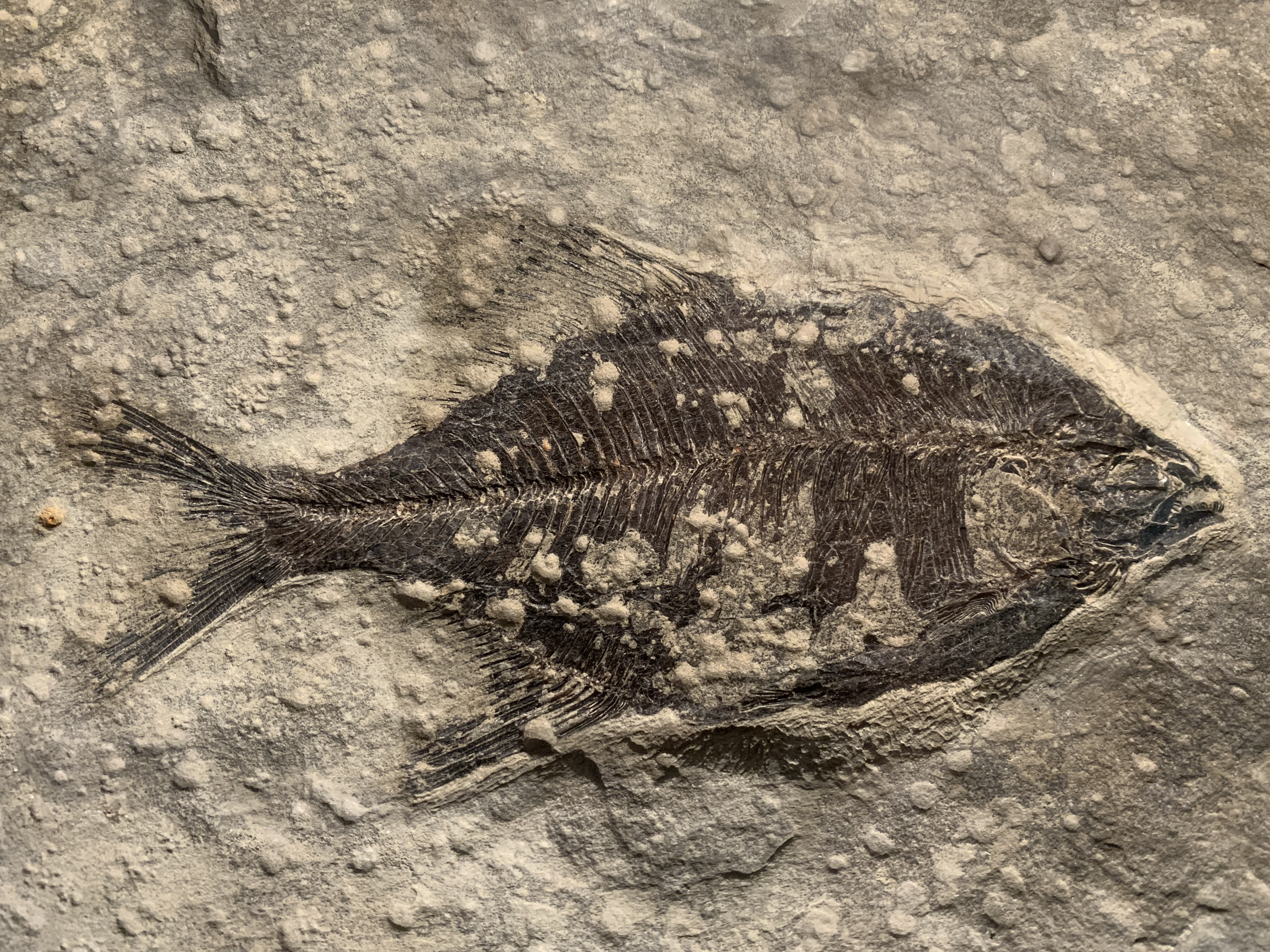
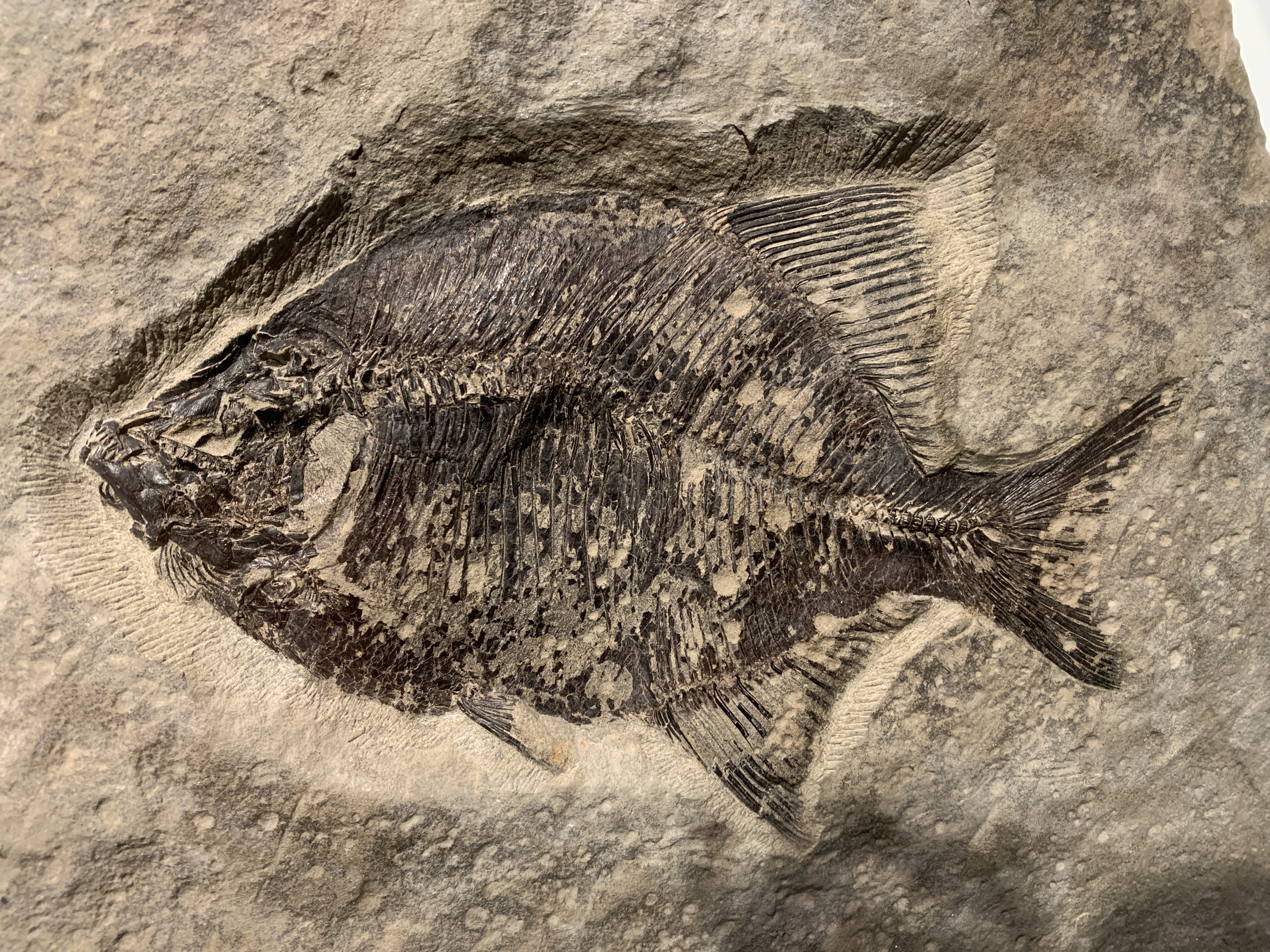
Holotypes of Joffrichthys tanyourus (left) and Lopadichthys colwellae (right), both from the upper Paskapoo (Late Palaeocene)

Amia, Joffrichthys, Lepisosteus and Lopadichthys

=== Cartilaginous fish ===
Myledaphus

=== Insects ===
Odonata, Orthoptera, Trichoptera, Diptera, and Coleoptera

=== Arachnids ===
Oribatida

== Resources ==
=== Building stone ===
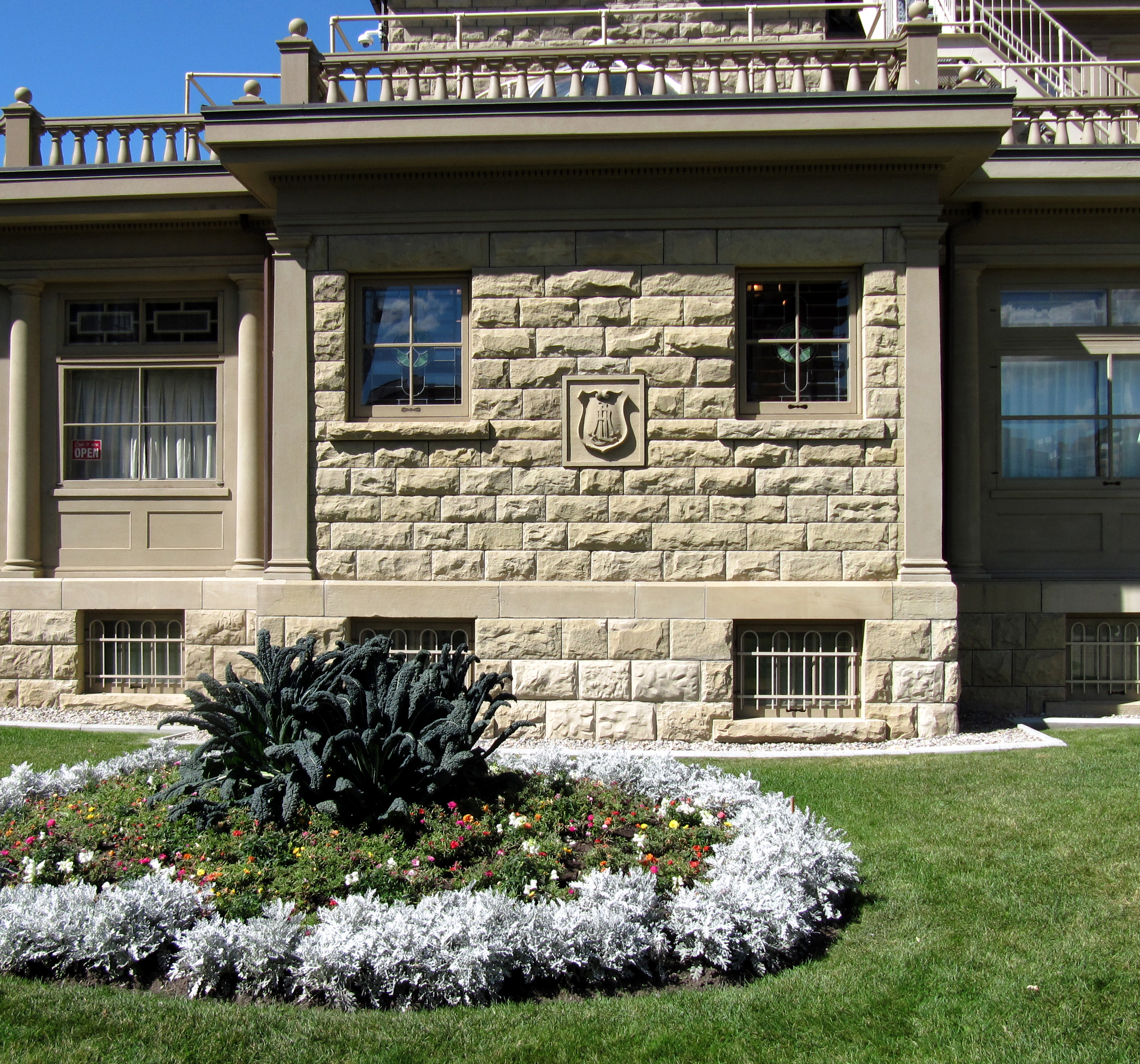
An example of Paskapoo sandstone used in construction: the east wall of the Lougheed House, Calgary

During the early 1900s, outcrops of Paskapoo sandstone in the Calgary area were quarried for building stone due to the requirement for fire-resistant buildings following the Calgary Fire of 1886. Many of Calgary's early landmark buildings, such as Lougheed House, Burns Manor, and some of the buildings along Stephen Avenue, were built using Paskapoo sandstone, and Calgary became known as the Sandstone City.

=== Coal ===
Coal has been mined from the Obed coal zone in the Paskapoo Formation near Hinton. It is of high-volatile bituminous rank with a low sulphur content, and it was shipped to markets in eastern Canada and the Pacific Rim.

=== Groundwater ===
Paskapoo Formation aquifers are a very important source of water for irrigation and drinking in southwestern Alberta.
