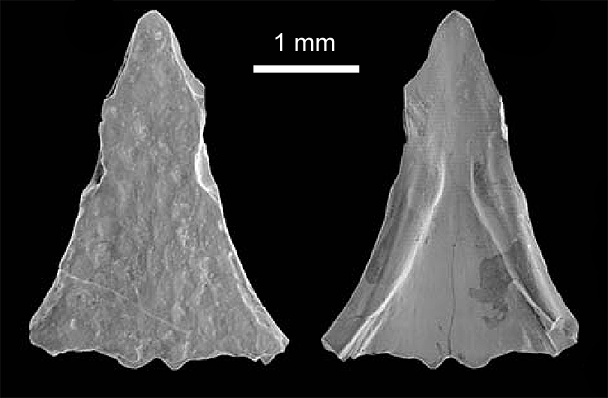
- The holotype of W. evansae - an isolated azygous frontal, in dorsal (left) and ventral (right) view, from the Lower Cretaceous of the Isle of Wight, southern England.

Scientific classification
- Kingdom: Animalia
- Phylum: Chordata
- Class: Amphibia
- Order: †Allocaudata
- Family: †Albanerpetontidae
- Genus: †Wesserpeton; Sweetman & Gardner, 2012
- Species: †W. evansae

Binomial name
- †Wesserpeton evansae Sweetman & Gardner, 2012

= Wesserpeton =

Wesserpeton Temporal range: Early Cretaceous, Barremian–Aptian

Extinct genus of amphibians

Wesserpeton is an extinct genus of albanerpetontid amphibian known from the Isle of Wight, southern England, and Balve, Germany.

== Description ==
Wesserpeton is known from the holotype NHMUK PV R36521, nearly complete fused frontals and from the referred materials NHMUK PV R36522–36568 and R36595–36611. All specimens were collected from seven localities of the Wessex Formation on the southeastern coast of the Isle of Wight of southern England. The type locality (Bed 38) is exposed at Yaverland while the rest (Bed L2) are exposed high in the cliff at Sudmoor Point but have yielded only NHMUK PV R36539, R36522 and R36553–36558. All specimens are dating to the Barremian stage of the Early Cretaceous.

== Etymology ==
Wesserpeton was first named by Steven C. Sweetman and James D. Gardner in 2013 and the type species is Wesserpeton evansae. The generic name is derived from Wess, from Wessex, an ancient British kingdom which included the Isle of Wight, and ἑρπετόν, erpeton, Greek for "creeping animal" which used in the construction of the name of Albanerpeton. The specific name honors Professor Susan E. Evans from the University College London for contributing the research of microvertebrate palaeontology and the understanding of Albanerpetontidae.
