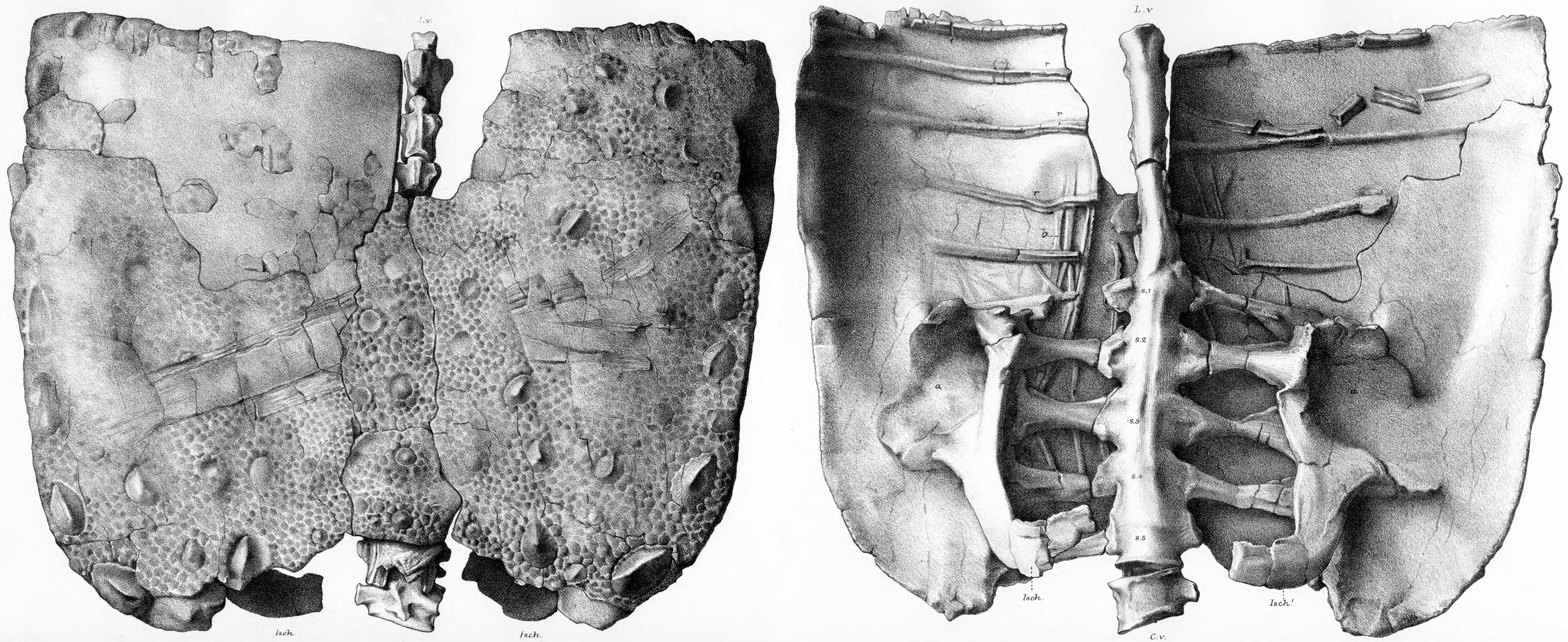
- Pelvis, sacrum, and associated armour of Polacanthus

Scientific classification
- Kingdom: Animalia
- Phylum: Chordata
- Class: Reptilia
- Clade: Dinosauria
- Clade: †Ornithischia
- Clade: †Thyreophora
- Clade: †Ankylosauria
- Family: †Nodosauridae
- Subfamily: †Polacanthinae
- Genus: †Polacanthus; Owen vide Anonymous, 1865

Type species
- †Polacanthus foxii Owen vide Anonymous, 1865

Synonyms
- Vectensia? Delair, 1982; Polacanthoides? Nopcsa, 1928

= Polacanthus =

Polacanthus Temporal range: Early Cretaceous, 130–125 Ma

Genus of ankylosaurian dinosaur

Polacanthus (from the Ancient Greek polys-/πολύς- "many" and akantha/ἄκανθα "thorn" or "prickle") is an extinct genus of ankylosaurian dinosaurs from the early Cretaceous (130–125 million years ago) of England. Several species have been named in the genus Polacanthus, but only the type species, Polacanthus foxii, is currently seen as valid. There are not many fossil remains of this dinosaur, and some important anatomical features, such as its skull, are poorly known. It grew to about 4–5 metres (13–16 ft) long. Its body was covered with armour plates and spikes. It may be a basal member of the Nodosauridae or part of a separate family, the Polacanthidae.

== History of study ==
=== Discovery ===
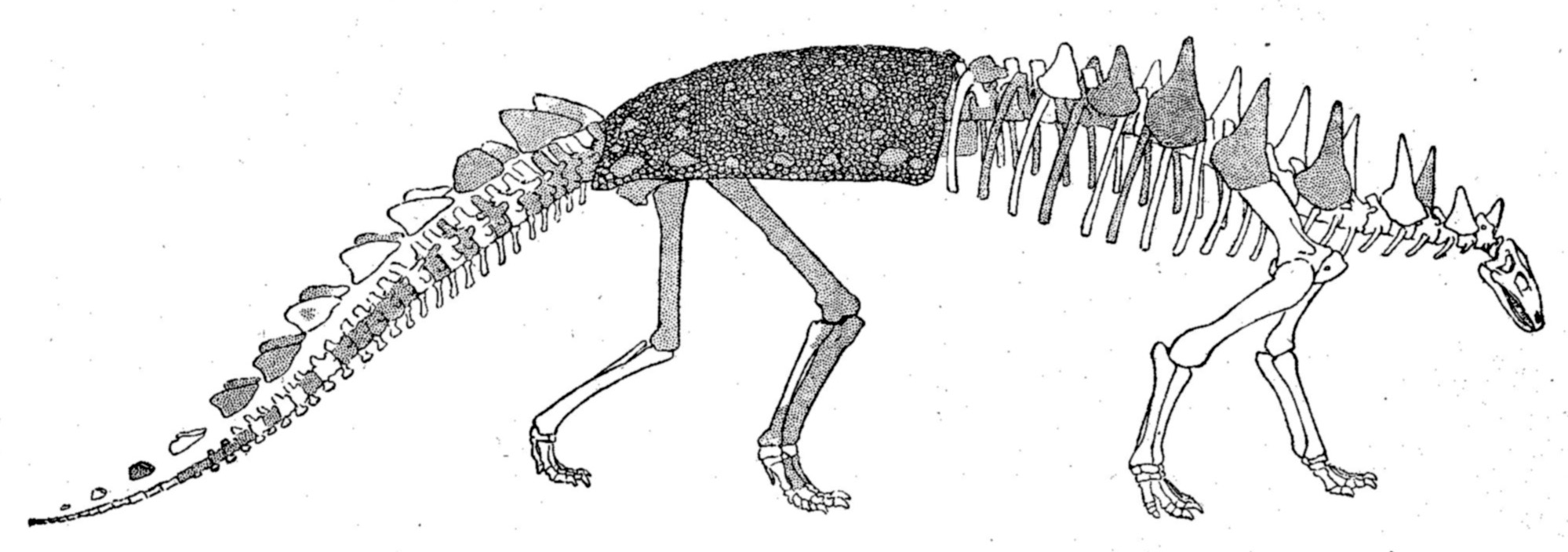
Historical P. foxii skeletal restoration by Franz Nopcsa von Felső-Szilvás

Polacanthus foxii was discovered by the Reverend William Fox on the Isle of Wight in early 1865, at Barnes High at the southwest coast. Fox at first planned to have his friend Alfred Tennyson name the new dinosaur during a meeting on 23 July 1865, when the remains were shown to paleontologist Richard Owen. Tennyson proposed Euacanthus Vectianus but this name was ultimately rejected. In September 1865, Fox in a lecture to the British Association reported on the find and let it be named Polacanthus foxii by Owen, hereby perhaps circumventing the convention that an author does not name a taxon after himself. The text of the lecture, only published in 1866, was more or less reproduced by him in anonymous articles in the Geological Magazine and the Illustrated London News of 16 September 1865. This procedure caused some confusion as no corresponding 1865 publication by Owen exists. Some have therefore contended that Thomas Huxley in 1867 became the author of the name, while others give Fox, Owen or "Anonymous" as the author. The generic name is derived from Greek πολύς, polys, "many" and ἄκανθα, akantha, "thorn", in reference to the many spikes of the armour. The specific name honours Fox.

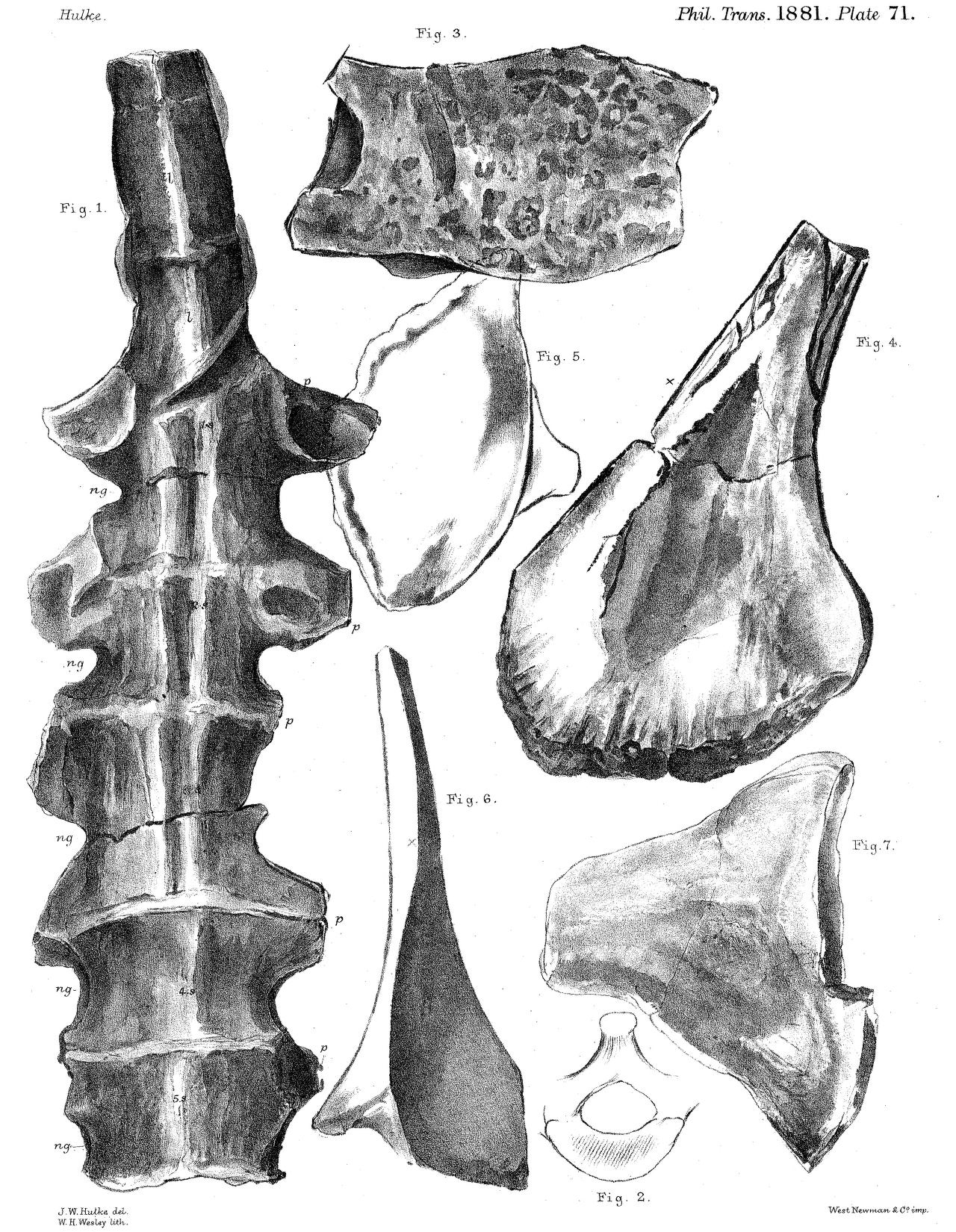
Fossils figured in Hulke, 1881

The holotype, NHMUK PV R175, was found in a layer of the Upper Wessex Formation dating from the Barremian. It is an incomplete skeleton with the head, neck, anterior armour and forelimbs missing but including dorsal vertebrae, a sacral rod of five dorsosacrals, the sacrum, most of the pelvis, most of the left hindleg, the right thighbone, twenty-two tail vertebrae, ribs, chevrons, ossified tendons, a pelvic shield, twenty-two spikes and numerous ossicles. The skeleton was in 1881 studied by John Whitaker Hulke, while it was still in the possession of Fox. Hulke published the first detailed description of the find, noting that the specimen had badly deteriorated over the years, the dermal armour having almost fully fallen apart. The same year Fox died, his collection was acquired by the British Museum of Natural History, including the Polacanthus fossil. This was after arrival in the museum in 1882, reassembled by preparator Caleb Barlow, painstakingly putting all the pieces together with Canada balsam, much to the wonder of Hulke who in 1881 had called this a hopeless undertaking. This allowed Hulke to redescribe the specimen in 1887, with a special attention to the armour arrangement. In 1905, when it was mounted by the museum, the specimen was again described by Franz Nopcsa who for the first time provided an illustration of the possible spike configuration. Later, the specimen was stored in the museum basement.

=== Additional specimens ===
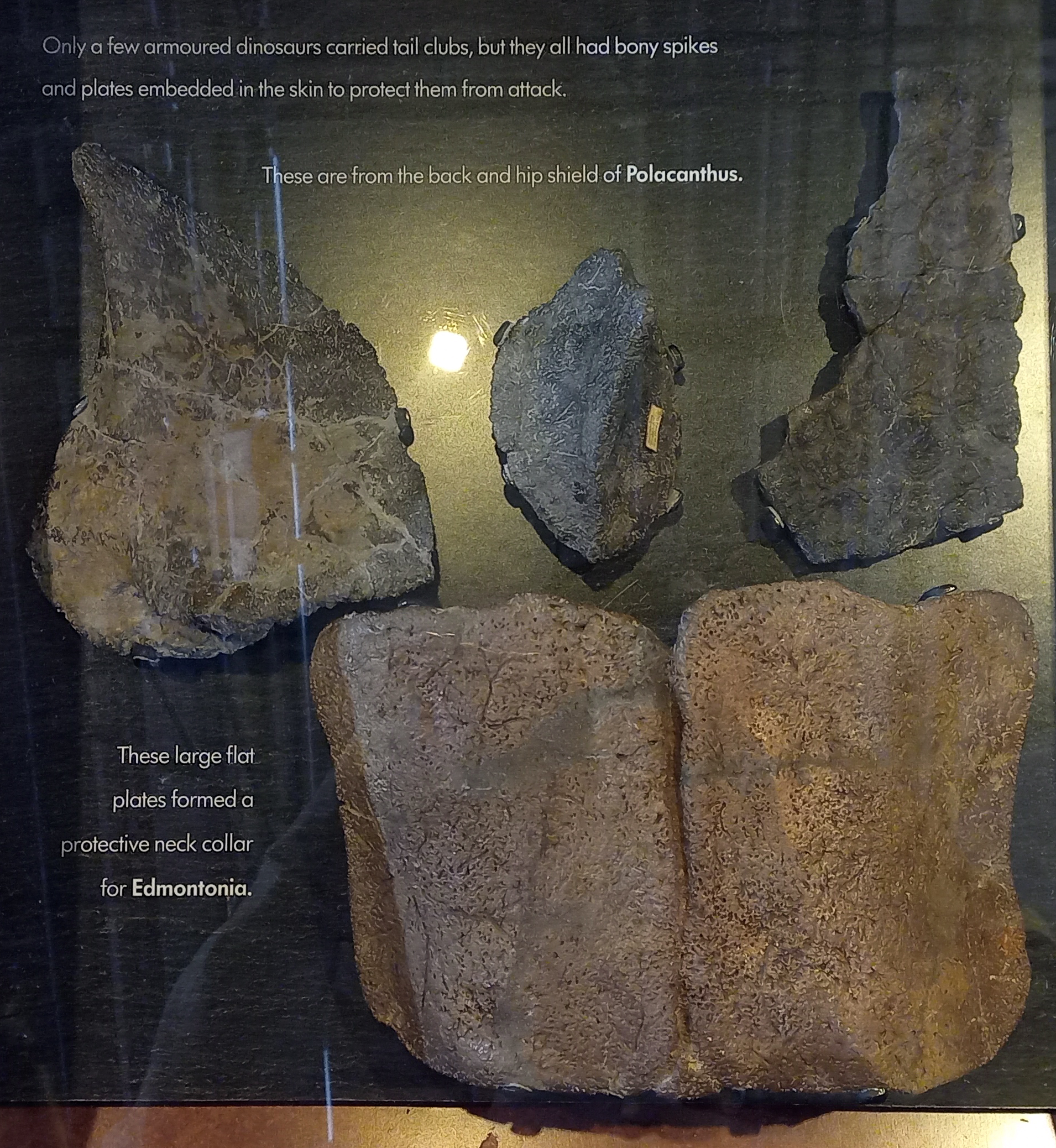
Osteoderms (above) at the Natural History Museum, London

Numerous other specimens from Wight and Great Britain have since been referred to Polacanthus. These mostly consist of single bones or armour elements. Several specimens that were discovered prior to the holotype were at various points considered to belong to Polacanthus. In 1843 John Edward Lee reported the discovery on Wight of three such specimens, consisting only of armour pieces. They were already lost before the description was published. In 1859, geologist Ernest P. Wilkins mentioned the presence in his collection of numerous scutes, spikes and vertebrae from Wight, referred by him to Hylaeosaurus. After his death, his collection was moved several times and the pieces were lost.

A second partial skeleton, from which parts had been removed since 1876, was identified and fully excavated by Dr. William T. Blows in 1979; it is also in the London Natural History Museum as specimen NHMUK R9293. It is the first specimen to show skull elements, neck vertebrae and unequivocal anterior armour. More contentious are finds from mainland England. In 2014 a partial skeleton was reported from Bexhill in Sussex, specimen BEXHM 1999.34.1-2011.23.1 discovered in the early summer of 1998 by David Brockhurst in the Ashdown Pevensey Quarry. This dates from the Valanginian. In 1999, 2007 and 2011, remains from Spain were referred to Polacanthus.

A 2020 review of British ankylosaurian fossils concluded that none of these additional specimens could be confidently referred to Polacanthus, which would therefore be represented only by the holotype.

== Description ==
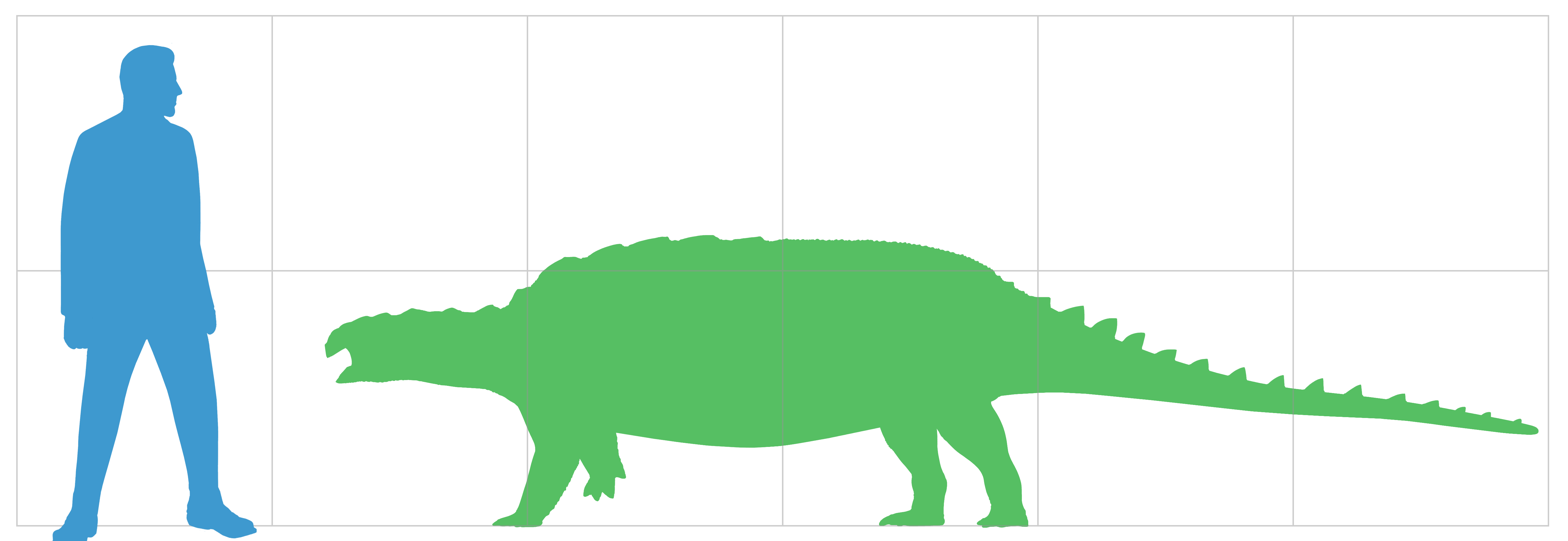
Estimated size based on the holotype compared to a human

Polacanthus was a medium-sized ankylosaur. In 2001, Darren Naish and David Martill estimated its length at 5 m (16 ft). In 2010, Gregory S. Paul supported the initial length estimate, while providing a body mass estimate of 2 t (4,400 lb). Thomas Holtz, in 2012, gave a lower estimation of 4 metres (13 ft) and 227–454 kg (500–1,001 lb). A taxon once assigned to Polacanthus, P. rudgwickensis (now Horshamosaurus), was approximately 30% larger.

Its hindlimbs are relatively long for an ankylosaur, with the holotype right femur measuring about 55.5 cm (21.9 in) in length.

In 2011 Barrett e.a. indicated two possible unique traits, autapomorphies: the floor of the neural canal is deeply cut by a groove with a V-shaped transverse profile; the caudal spikes have triangular bases in side view and narrow points. In 2020, a study concluded to a single autapomorphy: the ischia at half length curve towards each other, their rear ends touching at their inner sides.

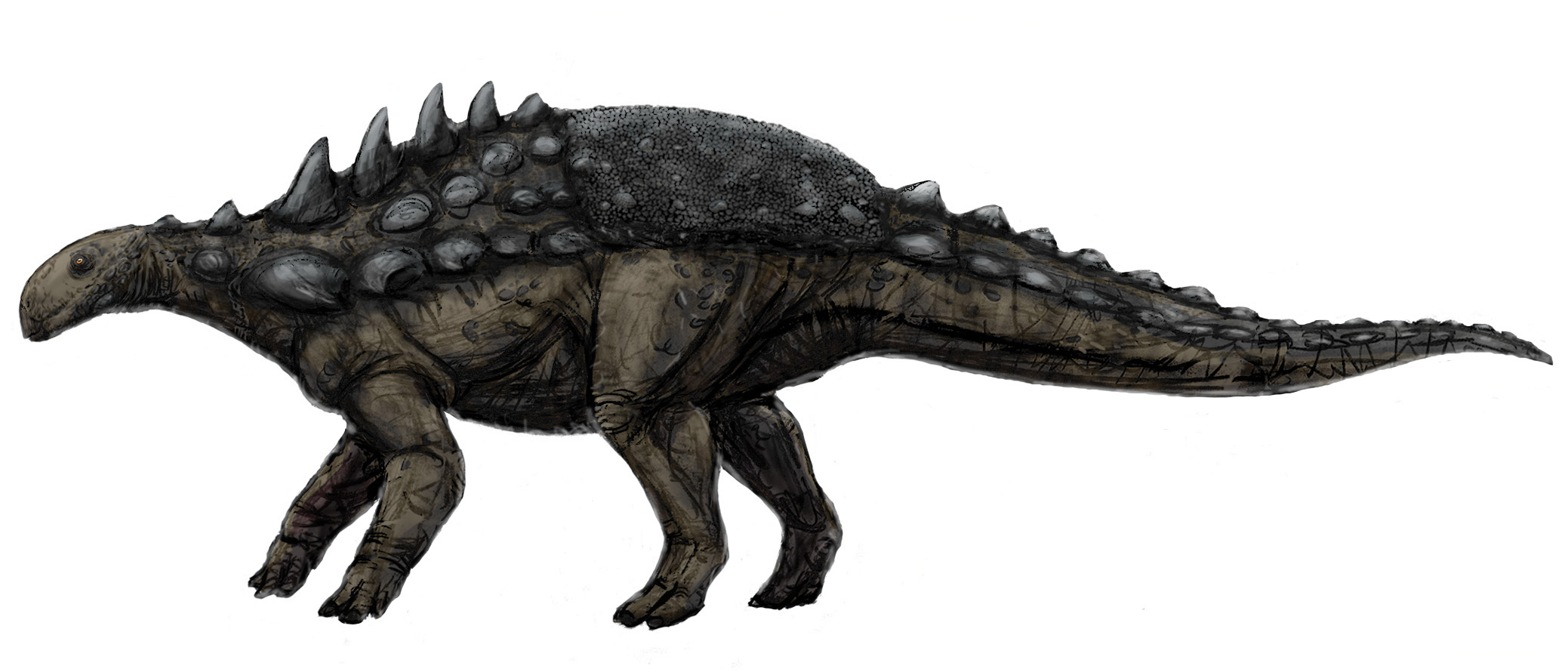
Speculative life restoration of Polacanthus based on Gastonia

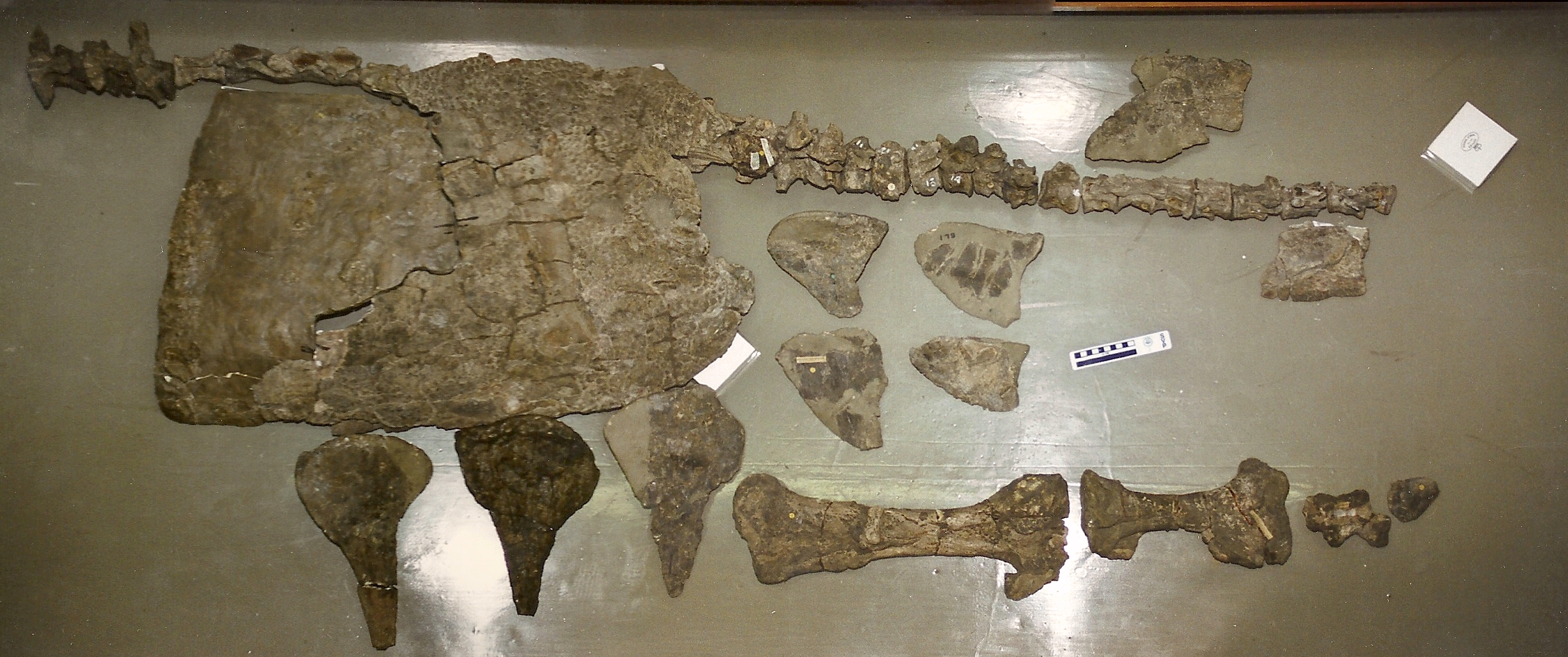
Type specimen of Polacanthus foxii

The subsequent describers have always dedicated much effort at restoring the armour configuration. Hulke understood that Polacanthus had a large "pelvic shield" or "sacral shield", a single fused sheet of dermal bone over its hips (sacral area) which perhaps was not attached to the underlying bone and decorated with tubercles. This feature is shared with other "polacanthine" (basal nodosaurids) dinosaurs such as Gastonia and Mymoorapelta. With the holotype, this shield is 108 centimetres wide and 90 centimetres long. It features four horizontal rows of larger keeled osteoderms per side, surrounded by smaller ossicles.

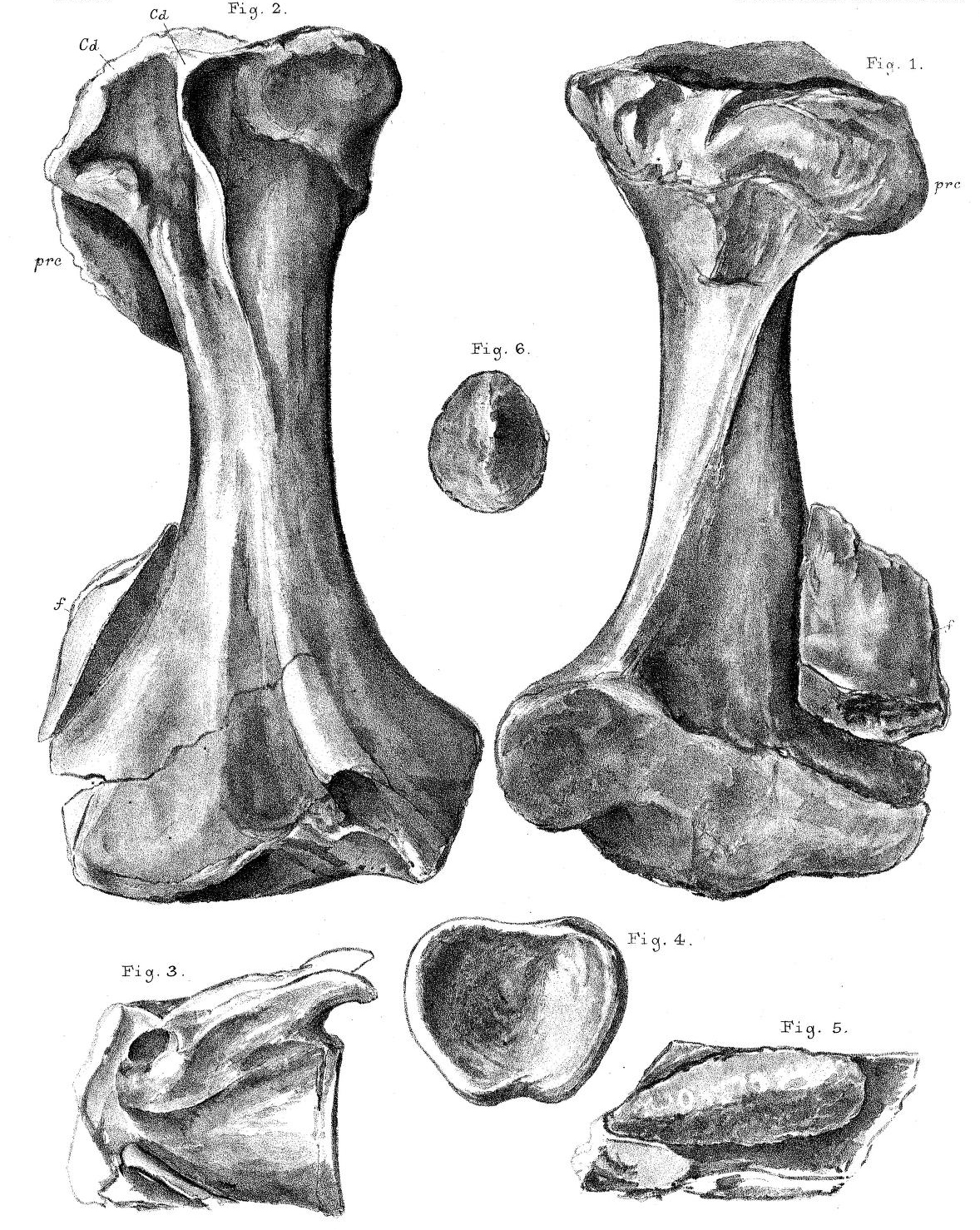
Tibia, vertebra and scutes

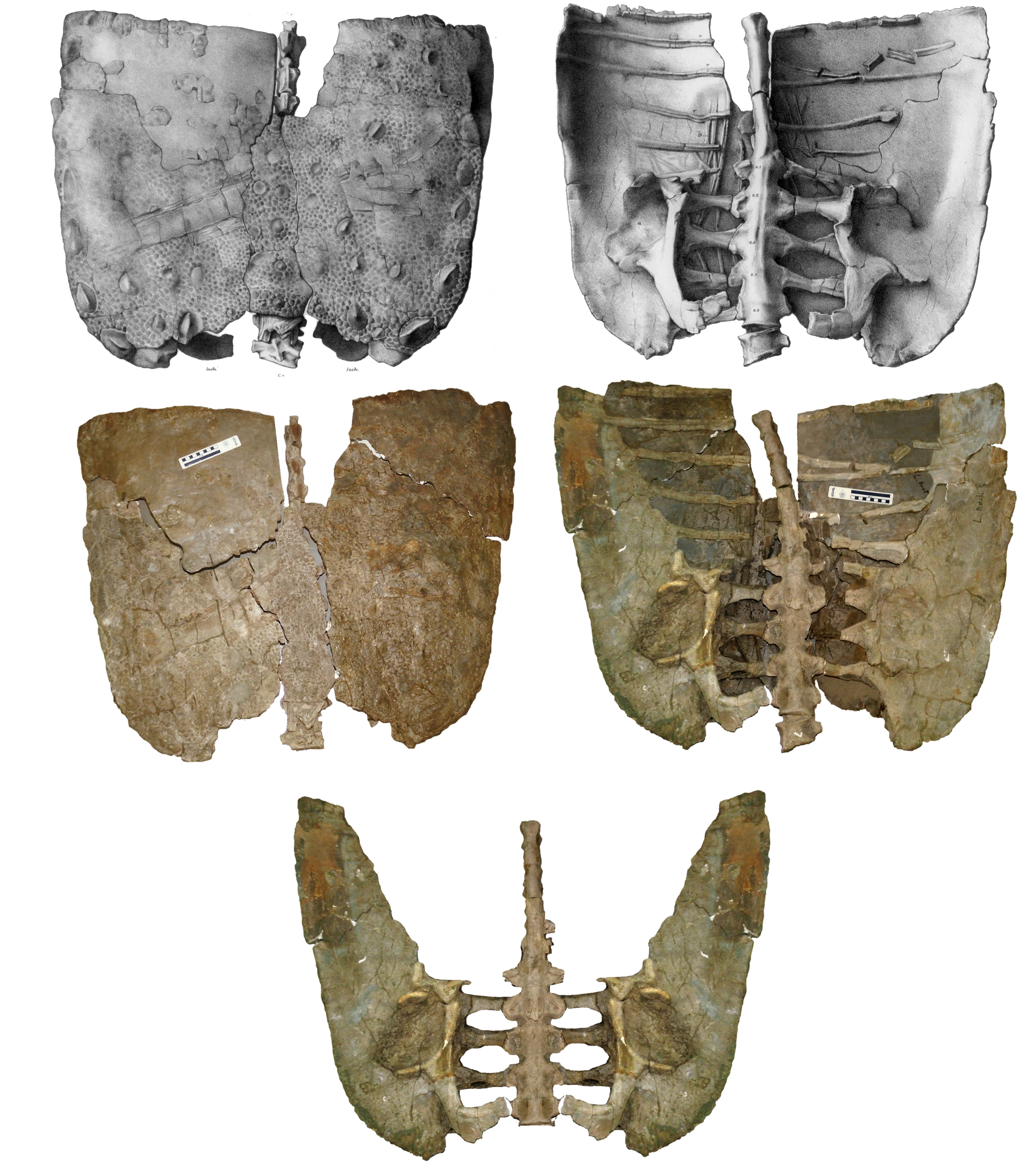
Pelvis of Polacanthus foxii (original illustration (top), modern photograph (middle), computer-generated image of the pelvis without the shield (bottom)

These latter are sometimes completely fused to form flat armour plates. Hulke thought that on the tail there were two rows of keeled osteoderms per side. Of a set of spikes found with the fossil, he assumed they had adorned the sides of the rump. A different arrangement was hypothesised by Nopcsa. He thought that both the tail and the front of the body including the neck featured two parallel rows of spikes, one per side. On the front body each row would have consisted of five spikes and he claimed that seven of these had been conserved with the fossil, five of the right side and two of the left. The tail rows would have consisted of twenty-two shorter pairs, fifteen spikes being still extant, eight of the left side and seven of the right. As the spikes are asymmetrical their position can more or less be deduced. Blows in 1987 basically agreed with Nopcsa but also distinguished three spike types, a Type A, B and C, allowing him to classify additional fossil finds, which often differed from the holotype spikes in several details. In 2013 a footprint was found by Henley Hobbs and his father on the Isle of Wight. Now a picture of the footprint is inside the dinosaur farm.

== Classification ==
=== Species ===
Polacanthus is known definitively only from its holotype specimen, representing the species P. foxii. However, numerous other species have been erroneously assigned to the genus Polacanthus in the past.

In 1924, Edwin Hennig named a Polacanthus becklesi, the specific name honouring collector Samuel Beckles, based on specimen BMNH R1926, a piece of an ilium associated with armour plates, found on Wight in the nineteenth century. Today this is often considered a junior synonym of P. foxii. It was assumed to be a different species because the armour is smoother on top, but this was likely caused by water erosion of the fossil.

In 1987, William T. Blows claimed that the American Hoplitosaurus was a species of Polacanthus, renaming it into Polacanthus marshi. Though this gained some popularity in the early 1990s, today the identity is generally rejected.

In 1996, a Polacanthus rudgwickensis was named by Blows, after a review of some fossil material found in 1985 and thought to have been Iguanodon, which was on display at the Horsham Museum in Sussex. The material, holotype HORSM 1988.1546, is fragmentary and includes several incomplete vertebrae, a partial scapulocoracoid, the distal end of a humerus, a nearly complete right tibia, rib fragments, and two osteoderms. P. rudgwickensis seems to have been about 30% longer than type species P. foxii and differs from it in numerous characters of the vertebrae and dermal armour. It is named after the village of Rudgwick in West Sussex and was discovered at a Rudgwick Brickworks Company quarry, at the quarry floor in gray-green marl beds of the Wessex Formation. Barremian age, approximately 124–132 million years ago. In 2015, Blows made it a separate genus Horshamosaurus.

In 1971, Polacanthus foxii was by Walter Coombs renamed into Hylaeosaurus foxi. This has found no acceptance, and the name is an invalid nomen ex dissertatione. Also it has been suggested that Polacanthus would be simply identical to Hylaeosaurus armatus. This was rejected by Blows in 1987, because of differences in age and anatomy. A possible identity is hard to prove or disprove as there are few overlapping elements in their holotypes.

In 1928, Nopcsa named a new genus and species Polacanthoides ponderosus, based on a number of syntypes: BMNH 2584, a left scapula found at Bolney which in 1841 by Gideon Mantell had been referred to Hylaeosaurus; and BMNH R1106 en 1107, a tibia and humerus. The new taxon has proven to be very problematic. Contrary to what Nopcsa assumed the tibia and humerus were not found at Bolney but on Wight. This makes Polacanthoides a possible chimera, especially since their provenance from Wight makes it likely they belonged to Polacanthus. Furthermore, the Wight specimens are not the original bones, which have been lost, but casts which at best could have been used as plastotypes. The scapula belongs to an indeterminate thyreophoran.

In 1982 Justin Delair named a genus Vectensia, without providing a specific name, based on specimen GH 981.45, an armour plate. Like the holotype of Polacanthus it was found at Barnes High, but reportedly in an older layer, of the Lower Wessex Formation. Blows in 1987 tentatively referred it to Polacanthus.

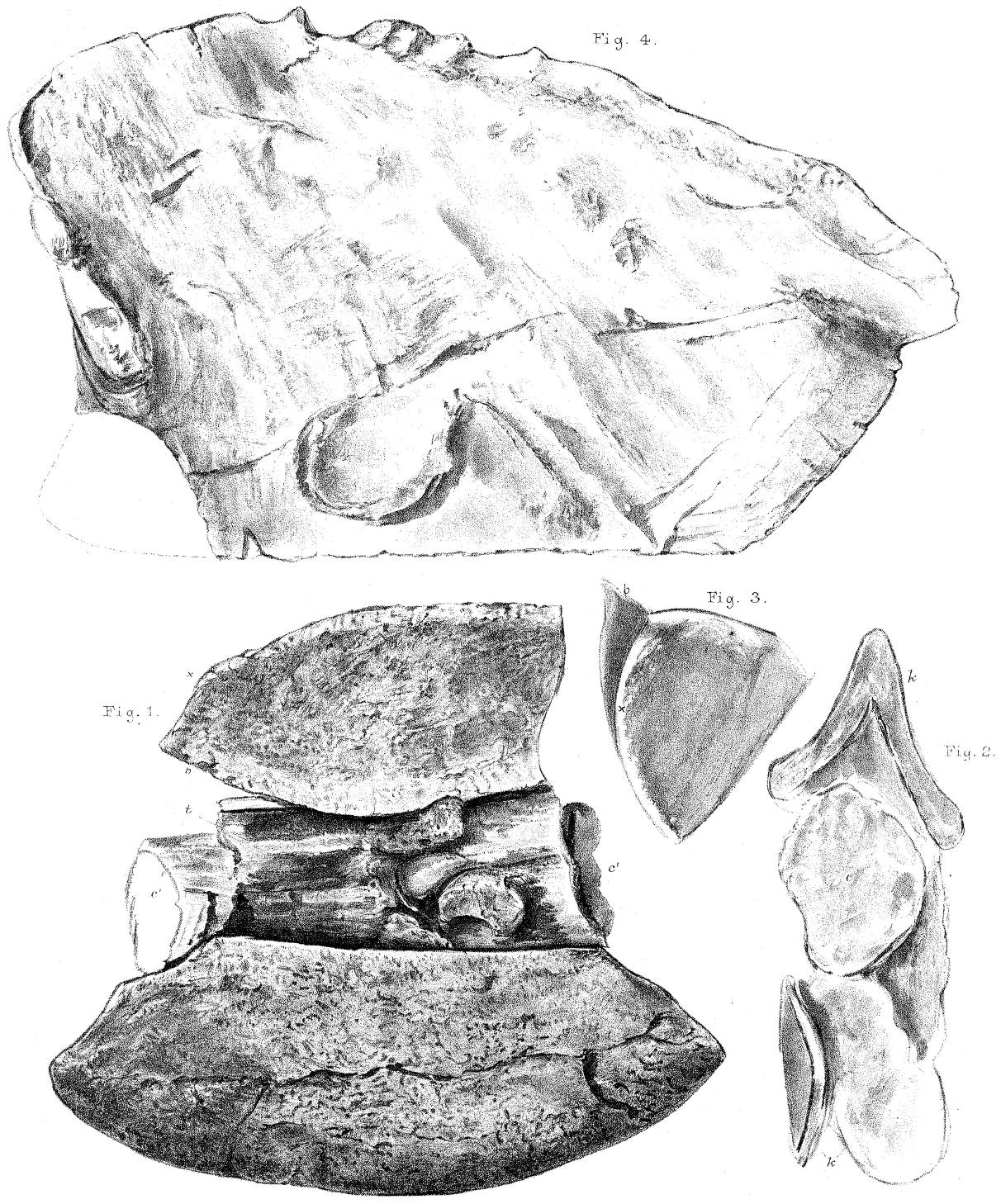
Tail, centrum, and scute fragments

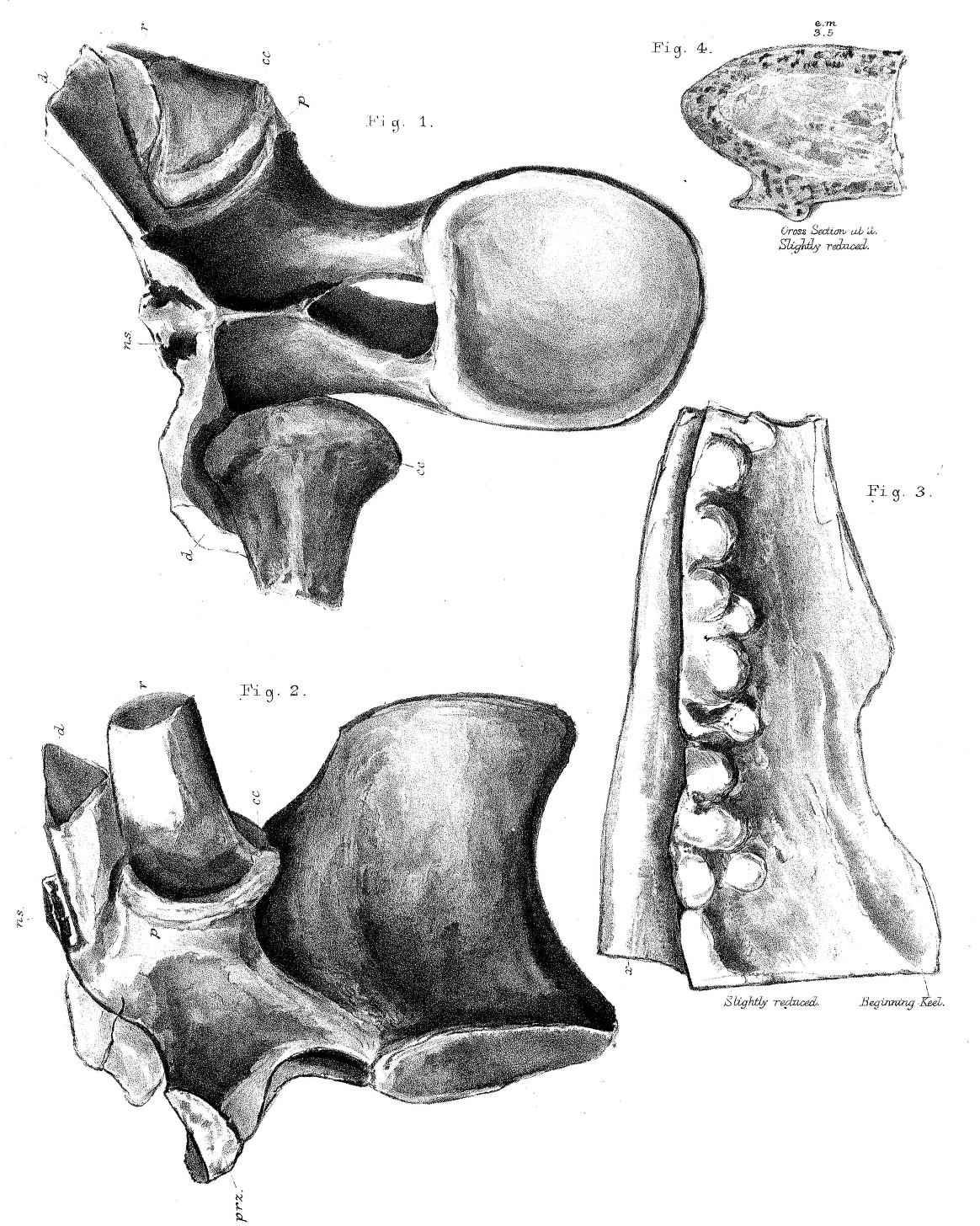
Vertebra and scute

=== Relationships ===
Fox in 1865 assigned Polacanthus to the Dinosauria, Huxley in 1870 and Hulke in 1881 assigned it to the Scelidosauridae. Its exact affinities were not well understood, until Coombs in 1978 placed in the Nodosauridae within a larger Ankylosauria. In 1996 Kenneth Carpenter e.a. refined this to the Polacanthinae. An alternative hypothesis, first suggested by Tracy Lee Ford in 2000, is that there existed a clade Polacanthidae below the Nodosauridae + Ankylosauridae node.

A more conventional analysis from 2012, in which Polacanthus foxii and P. rudgwickensis were not recovered as sister species, is shown by this cladogram:

- Nodosauridae
  - Antarctopelta
  - - - Mymoorapelta
      - - Hylaeosaurus
        - Anoplosaurus
    - - Tatankacephalus
      - Polacanthus rudgwickensis (= Horshamosaurus)
      - Polacanthinae
        - Gargoyleosaurus
        - Hoplitosaurus
        - - Gastonia
          - - Peloroplites
            - Polacanthus
      - - - Struthiosaurus
          - Zhejiangosaurus
        - - Hungarosaurus
          - - Animantarx
            - - Niobrarasaurus
              - Nodosaurus
              - Pawpawsaurus
              - Sauropelta
              - Silvisaurus
              - Stegopelta
              - Texasetes
              - - Edmontonia
                - Panoplosaurus

== See also ==
- Timeline of ankylosaur research

== Bibliography ==
- Blows WT (2001). "Dermal Armor of Polacanthine Dinosaurs". In Carpenter, Kenneth (ed.). The Armored Dinosaurs. Indiana University Press. pp. 363–385. ISBN 0-253-33964-2.
- Carpenter K (2001). "Phylogenetic analysis of the Ankylosauria". In Carpenter, Kenneth (ed.). The Armored Dinosaurs. Indiana University Press. pp. 455–484. ISBN 0-253-33964-2.
