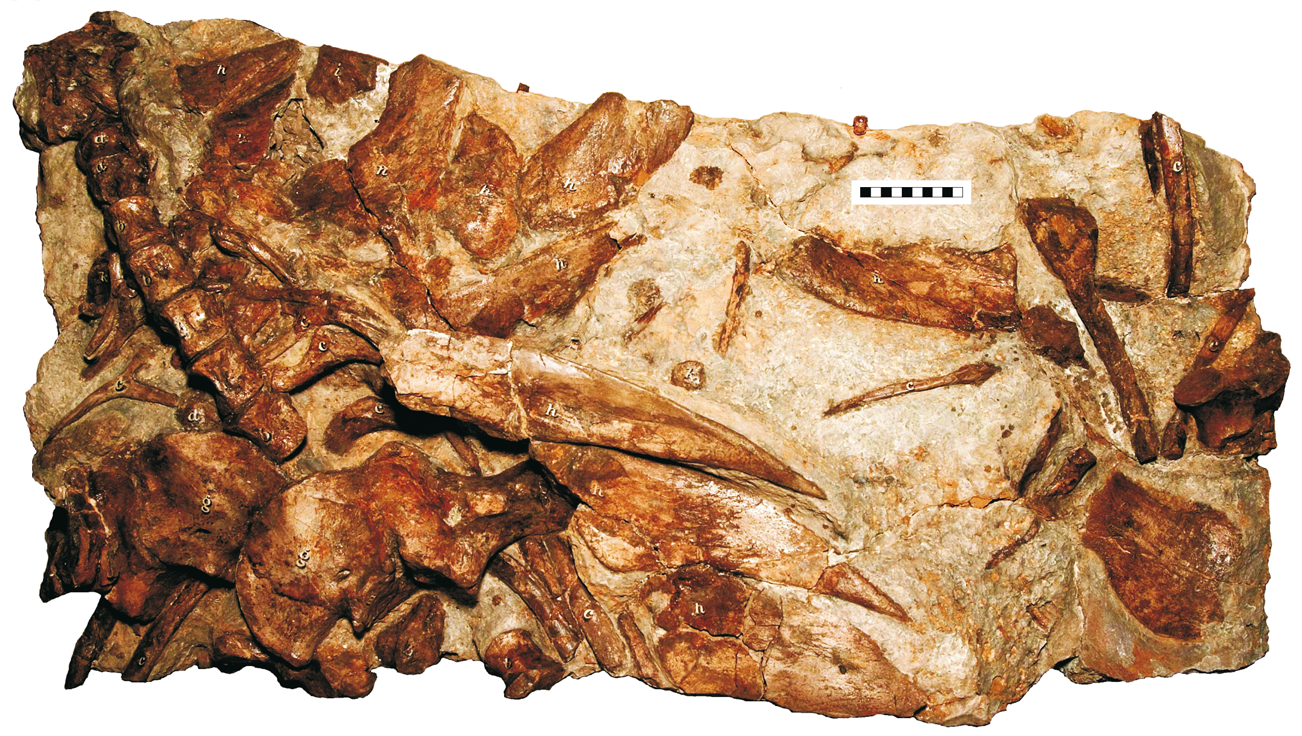
- Holotype NHMUK PV OR 3775

Scientific classification
- Kingdom: Animalia
- Phylum: Chordata
- Class: Reptilia
- Clade: Dinosauria
- Clade: †Ornithischia
- Clade: †Thyreophora
- Clade: †Ankylosauria
- Clade: †Euankylosauria
- Family: †Nodosauridae
- Genus: †Hylaeosaurus; Mantell, 1833
- Species: †H. armatus

Binomial name
- †Hylaeosaurus armatus Mantell, 1833

Synonyms
- Hylosaurus Fitzinger, 1843; Polacanthoides? Nopcsa, 1928

= Hylaeosaurus =

Hylaeosaurus Temporal range: Berriasian-Valanginian ~140–136 Ma

Ankylosaurian dinosaur genus from Early Cretaceous Period

Hylaeosaurus (/haɪˌliːoʊˈsɔːrəs/ hy-LEE-o-SOR-əs) is a herbivorous ankylosaurian dinosaur that lived about 136 million years ago, in the late Valanginian stage of the early Cretaceous period of England. It was found in the Grinstead Clay.

Hylaeosaurus was one of the first dinosaurs to be discovered, in 1832 by Gideon Mantell. In 1842 it was one of the three dinosaurs Richard Owen based the Dinosauria on, the others being Iguanodon and Megalosaurus. Four species were named in the genus, but only the type species Hylaeosaurus armatus is today considered valid. Only limited remains have been found of Hylaeosaurus and much of its anatomy is unknown. It might have been a basal nodosaurid, although a recent cladistic analysis recovers it as a basal ankylosaurid.

Hylaeosaurus was about five metres long. It was an armoured dinosaur that carried at least three long spines on its shoulder.

== History of discovery ==
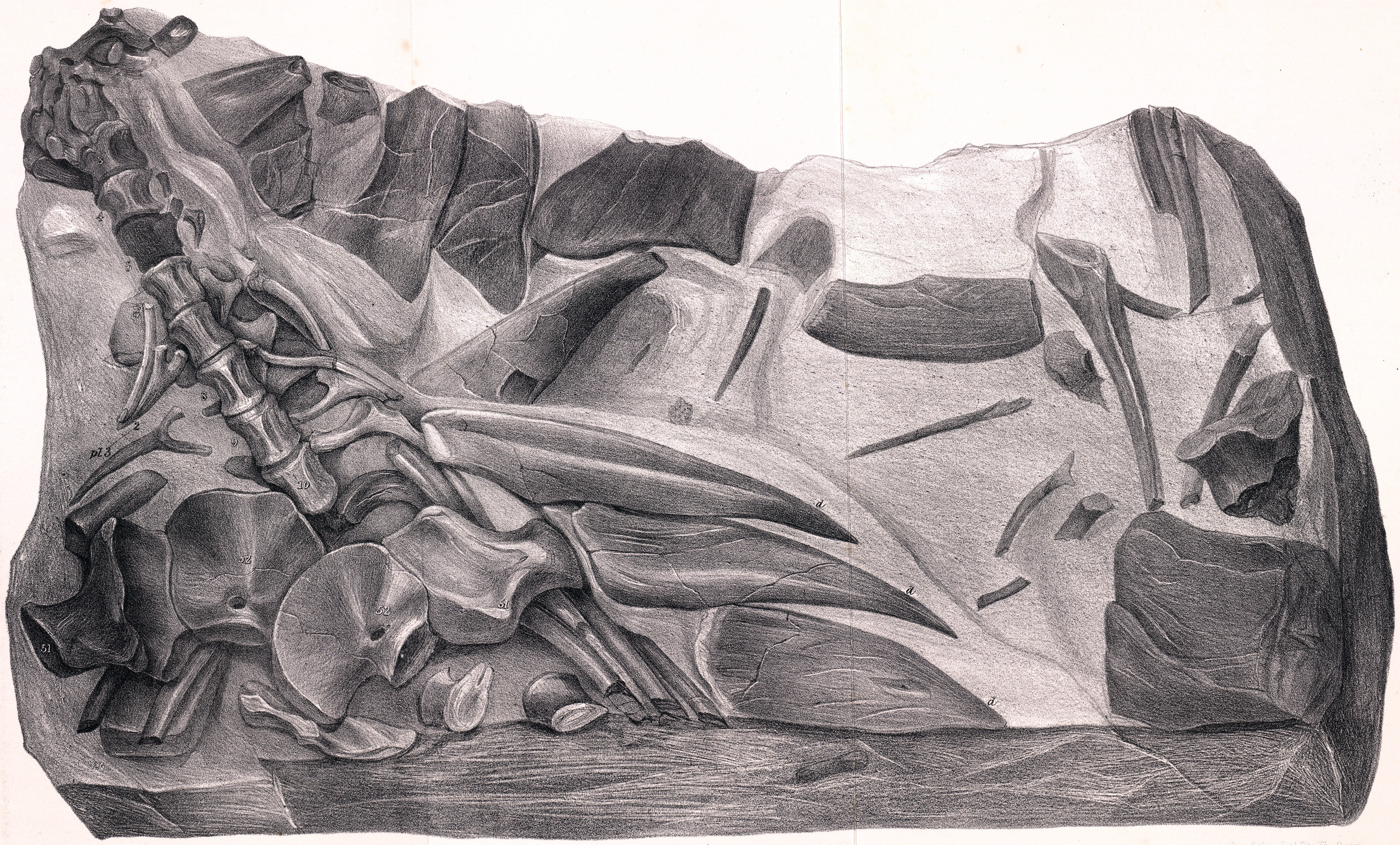
Illustration of the holotype in its matrix, 1868

The first Hylaeosaurus fossils were discovered in the Grinstead Clay, West Sussex. On 20 July 1832, fossil collector Gideon Mantell wrote to Professor Benjamin Silliman that when a gunpowder explosion had demolished a quarry rock face in Tilgate Forest, several of the boulders freed showed the bones of a saurian. A local fossil dealer had assembled the about fifty pieces, described by him as a "great consarn of bites and boanes". Having doubts about the value of the fragments, Mantell had nevertheless purchased the pieces and soon discovered they could be united into a single skeleton, partially articulated. Mantell was delighted with the find because previous specimens of Megalosaurus and Iguanodon had consisted of single bone elements. The discovery in fact represented the most complete non-avian dinosaur skeleton known at the time. He was strongly inclined to describe the find as belonging to the latter genus, but during a visit by William Clift, the curator of the Royal College of Surgeons of England museum, and his assistant John Edward Gray, he began to doubt the identification. Clift was the first to point out that several plates and spikes were probably part of a body armour, attached to the back or sides of the rump. In November 1832 Mantell decided to create a new generic name: Hylaeosaurus. It is derived from the Greek ὑλαῖος, hylaios, "of the wood". Mantell originally claimed the name Hylaeosaurus meant "forest lizard", after the Tilgate Forest in which it was discovered. Later, he claimed that it meant "Wealden lizard" ("wealden" being another word for forest), in reference to the Wealden Group, the name for the early Cretaceous geological formation in which the dinosaur was first found.

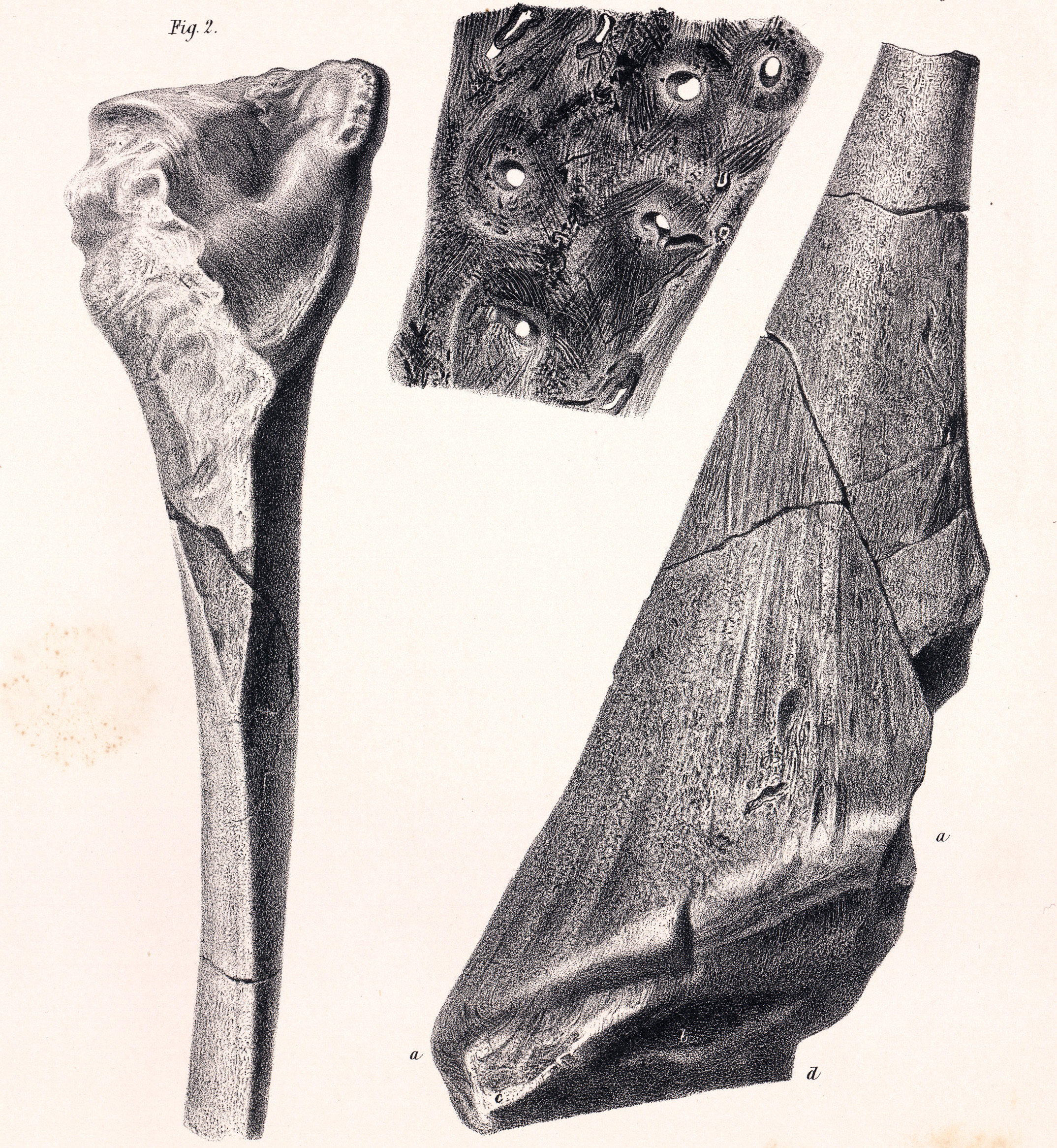
Dermal spine

On 30 November Mantell sent the piece to the Geological Society of London. Shortly afterwards he himself went to London and on 5 December during a meeting of the Society, in which he for the first time personally met Richard Owen, reported on the find to large acclaim. However, he was also informed that a paper he had already prepared, was a third too long. On advice of his friend Charles Lyell, Mantell decided instead of rewriting the paper, to publish an entire book on his fossil finds and dedicate a chapter to Hylaeosaurus. Within three weeks Mantell composed the volume from earlier notes. On 17 December Henry De la Beche warned him that the changed conventions in nomenclature implied that only he who provided a full species name was recognised as the author: to Hylaeosaurus a specific name needed to be added. Mantell on 19 December chose armatus, Latin for "armed" or "armoured", in reference to the spikes and armour plates. As Mantell himself put it: "there appears every reason to conclude that either its back was armed with a formidable row of spines, constituting a dermal fringe, or that its tail possessed the same appendage". In May 1833 his The Geology of the South-East of England appeared, hereby validly naming the type species Hylaeosaurus armatus. Mantell published a lithograph of his find in The Geology of the South-East of England; and another drawing in the fourth edition of The Wonders of Geology, in 1840.

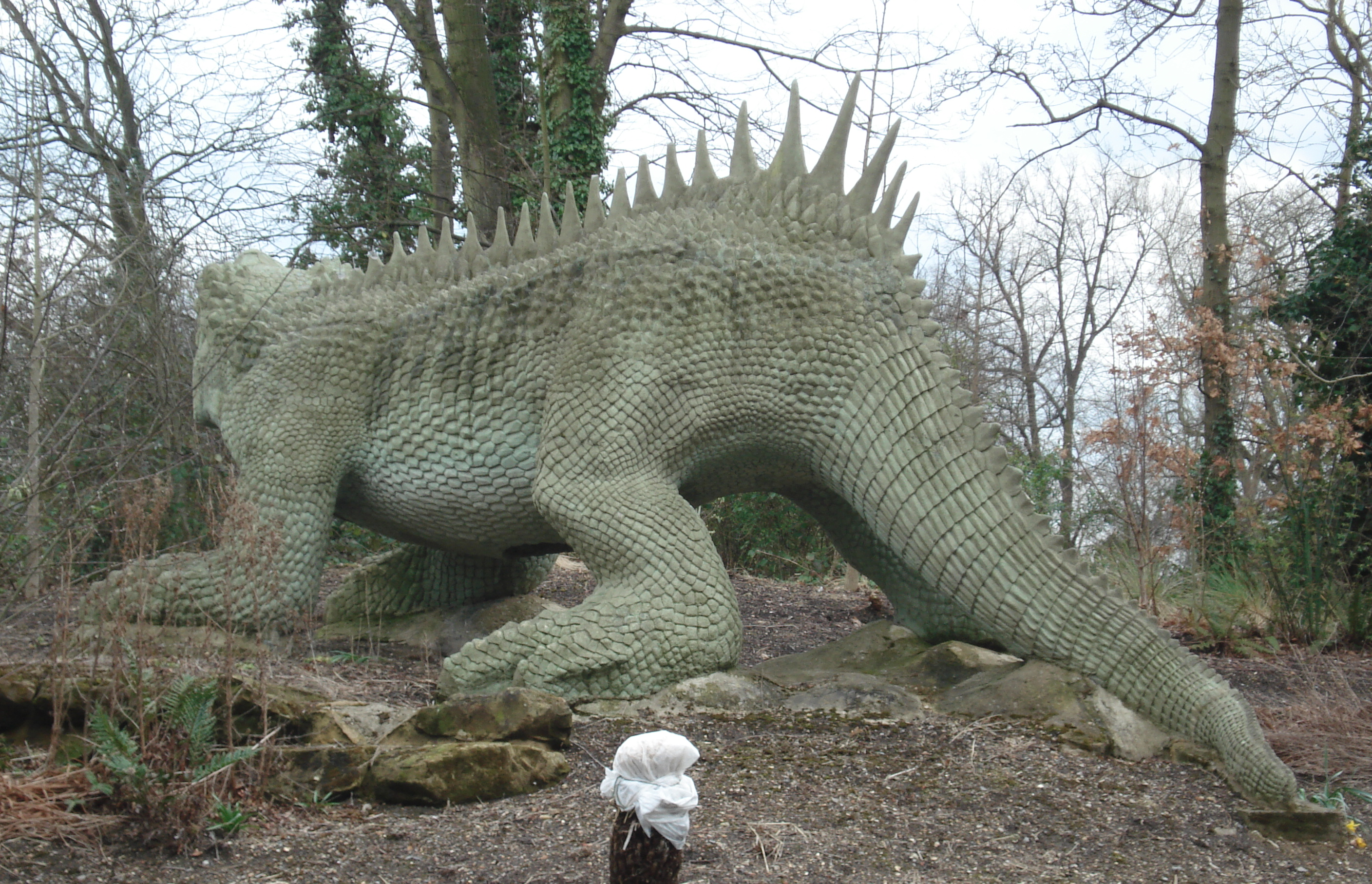
Crystal Palace model by Benjamin Waterhouse Hawkins

Hylaeosaurus is the most obscure of the three animals used by Sir Richard Owen to first define the new group Dinosauria, in 1842, the other genera being Megalosaurus and Iguanodon. Not only has Hylaeosaurus received less public attention, despite being included in the life-sized models by Benjamin Waterhouse Hawkins placed in the Crystal Palace Park, it also never functioned as a "wastebasket taxon". Owen in 1840 developed a new hypothesis about the spikes; noting they were asymmetrical he correctly rejected the notion they formed a row on the back but incorrectly assumed they were gastralia or belly-ribs.

The original specimen, recovered by Gideon Mantell from the Tilgate Forest, was in 1838 acquired by the Natural History Museum of London. It has the inventory number NHMUK PV OR 3775 (earlier BMNH 3775). It was found in a layer of the Tunbridge Wells Sand Formation dating from the Valanginian, about 137 million years old. This holotype is the best specimen and is composed of the front end of a skeleton minus most of the head and the forelimbs, though only the parts on the face of the stone block are easily studied. The block measures about 135 by 75 centimetres. The holotype consists of the rear of the skull and perhaps lower jaws, ten vertebrae, both scapulae, both coracoids and several spikes and armour plates. The skeleton is viewed from below. For a long time no further preparation had taken place, beyond the assembly and chiselling out by Mantell himself, but in the early twenty-first century the museum began to further free the bones by both chemical and mechanical means. This has proven difficult because the acids used tended to dissolve the glue and gypsum with which the fossils had been repaired, causing the blocks to fall apart. The limited information gained by the preparations by Mark Graham since 2003, was published in 2020, together with a revised description.

Several finds from the mainland of Britain have been referred to Hylaeosaurus armatus. However, in 2011 Paul Barrett and Susannah Maidment concluded that only the holotype could with certainty be associated with the species, in view of the presence of Polacanthus in the same layers.

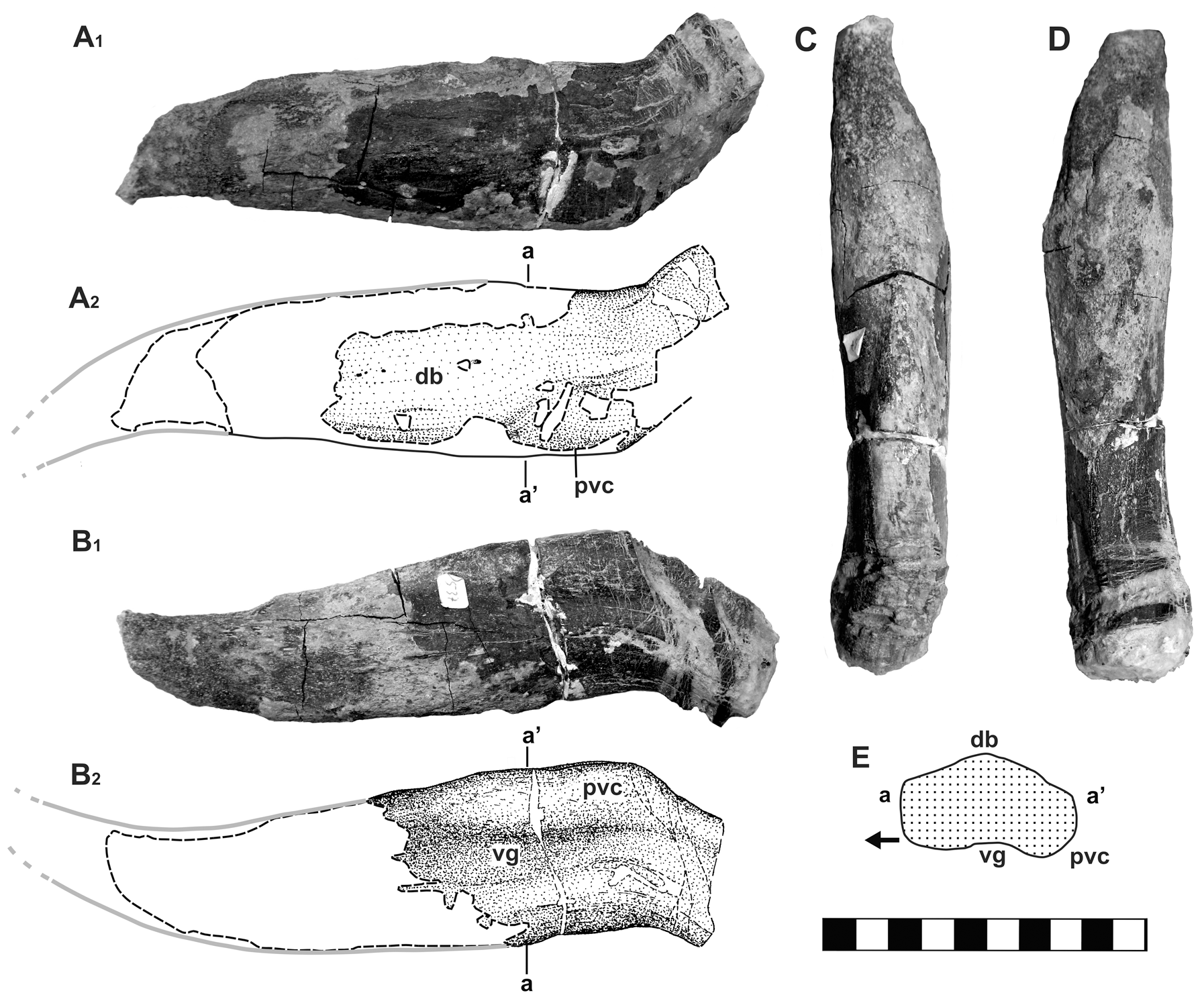
Referred spike from Germany

Additional remains have been referred to Hylaeosaurus, from the Isle of Wight, (the Ardennes of) France, Bückeberg Formation, Germany, Spain and Romania. The remains from France may actually belong to Polacanthus and the other references are today also considered dubious. However, possible remains were reported from Germany in 2013: a spike, specimen DLM 537 and the lower end of a humerus, specimen GPMM A3D.3, which were referred to a Hylaeosaurus sp.

=== Later species ===
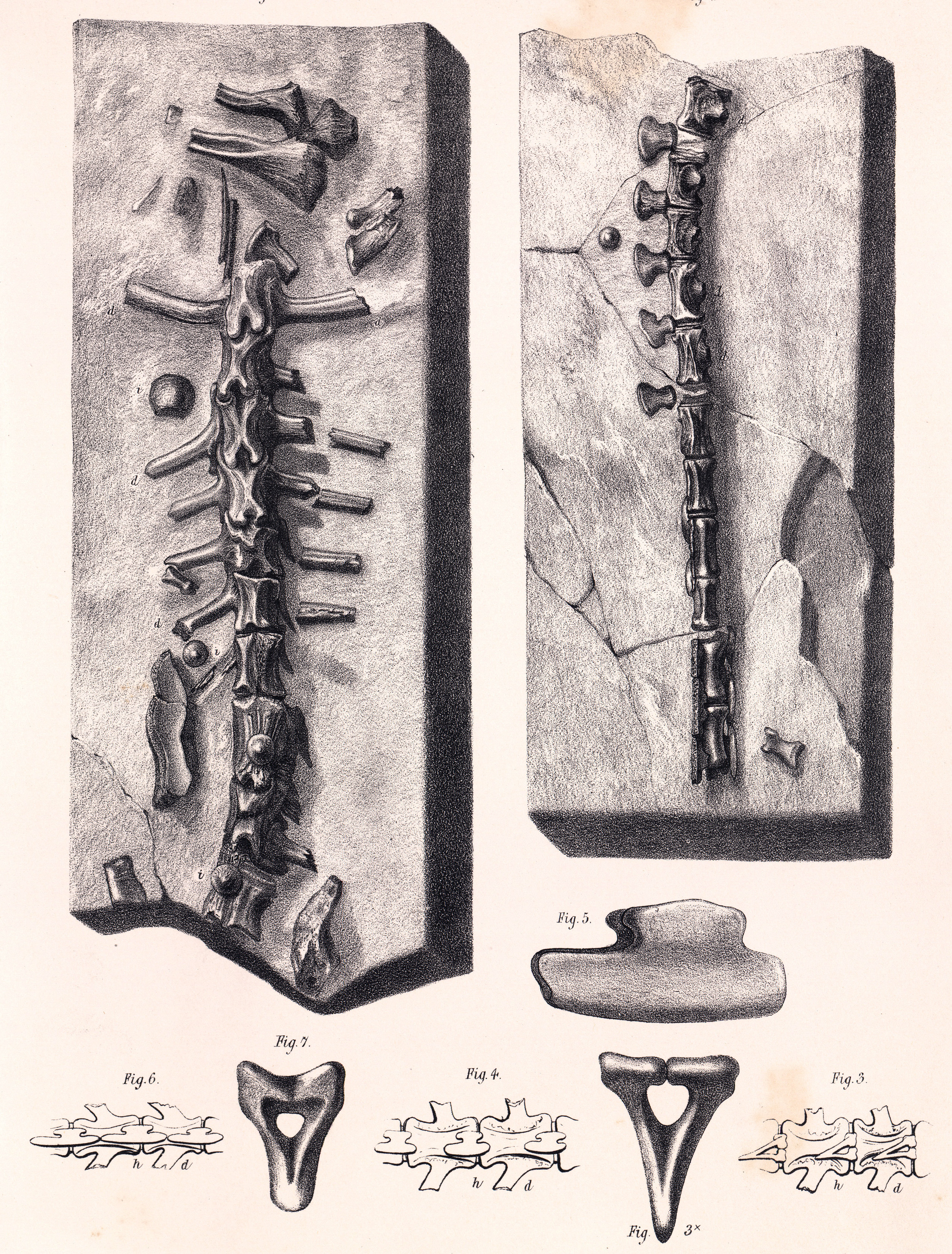
Specimen referred to H. oweni

Hylaeosaurus armatus Mantell 1833 is currently considered the only valid species in the genus. However, three others have been named. In 1844, Mantell named Hylaeosaurus oweni based on the same specimen as H. armatus, wanting to honour Richard Owen. This has been sunk as a junior objective synonym of H. armatus. In 1956 Alfred Romer renamed Regnosaurus into Hylaeosaurus northhamptoni. Polacanthus Owen 1865 was by Walter Coombs in 1971 renamed into Hylaeosaurus foxii. These last two names have found no acceptance; H. foxii remained an invalid nomen ex dissertatione. It has also been suggested that Polacanthus is simply the same species as Hylaeosaurus armatus and thus a junior synonym, but there are a number of differences in their osteology.

Sometimes bones from the Hylaeosaurus material have later been made separate species. In 1928 Franz Nopcsa made specimen NHMUK PV OR 2584, a left scapula referred by Mantell to H. armatus, part of the type material of Polacanthoides ponderosus. Though in 1978 synonymised with Hylaeosaurus, Polacanthoides is today considered a nomen dubium, an indeterminate member of the Thyreophora.

== Description ==
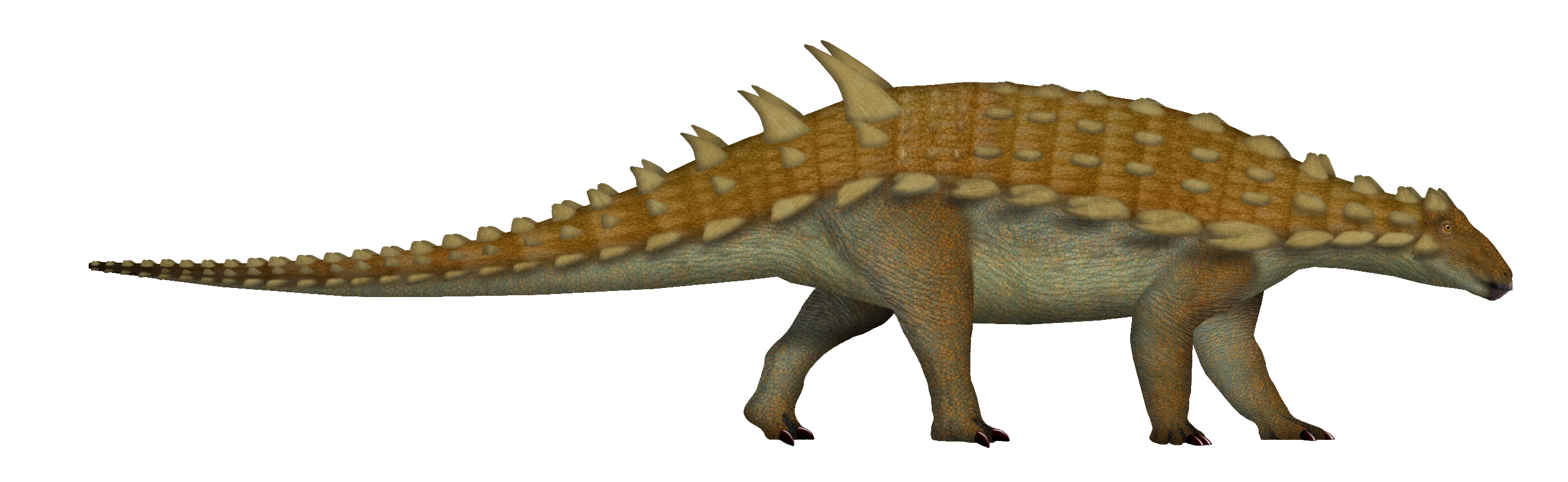
Life restoration

Gideon Mantell originally estimated that Hylaeosaurus was about 7.6 metres (25 ft) long, or about half the size of the other two original dinosaurs, Iguanodon and Megalosaurus. At the time, he modelled the animal after a modern lizard. Modern estimates range up to 6 metres (20 ft) in length. Gregory S. Paul in 2010 estimated the length at 5 metres (16 ft), the weight at 2 tonnes (2.0 long tons; 2.2 short tons). Some estimates are considerably lower: in 2001 Darren Naish e.a. gave a length of 3–4 metres (9.8–13.1 ft).

Many details about the build of Hylaeosaurus are unknown, especially if the material is strictly limited to the holotype. Maidment gave two autapomorphies, unique derived traits: the scapula did not fuse with the coracoid, even when the animal was of a considerable size; there were three long spines on its shoulder. Even these traits are not very distinctive: Mantell and Owen had attributed the lack of fusion to ontogeny and the total number of spines cannot be observed. Hylaeosaurus is often styled as a fairly typical nodosaur, with rows of armour plating on the back and tail combined with a relatively long head, equipped with a beak used to crop low-lying vegetation.

In 2001 the skull and lower jaws remains were described by Kenneth Carpenter. The damaged and shifted skull elements provided little information. The quadrate is laterally bowed. The quadratojugal has a high attachment point on the shaft of the quadrate. A triangular postorbital horn was present. In 2020, it was concluded that the presumed quadrate was in fact the jugal.

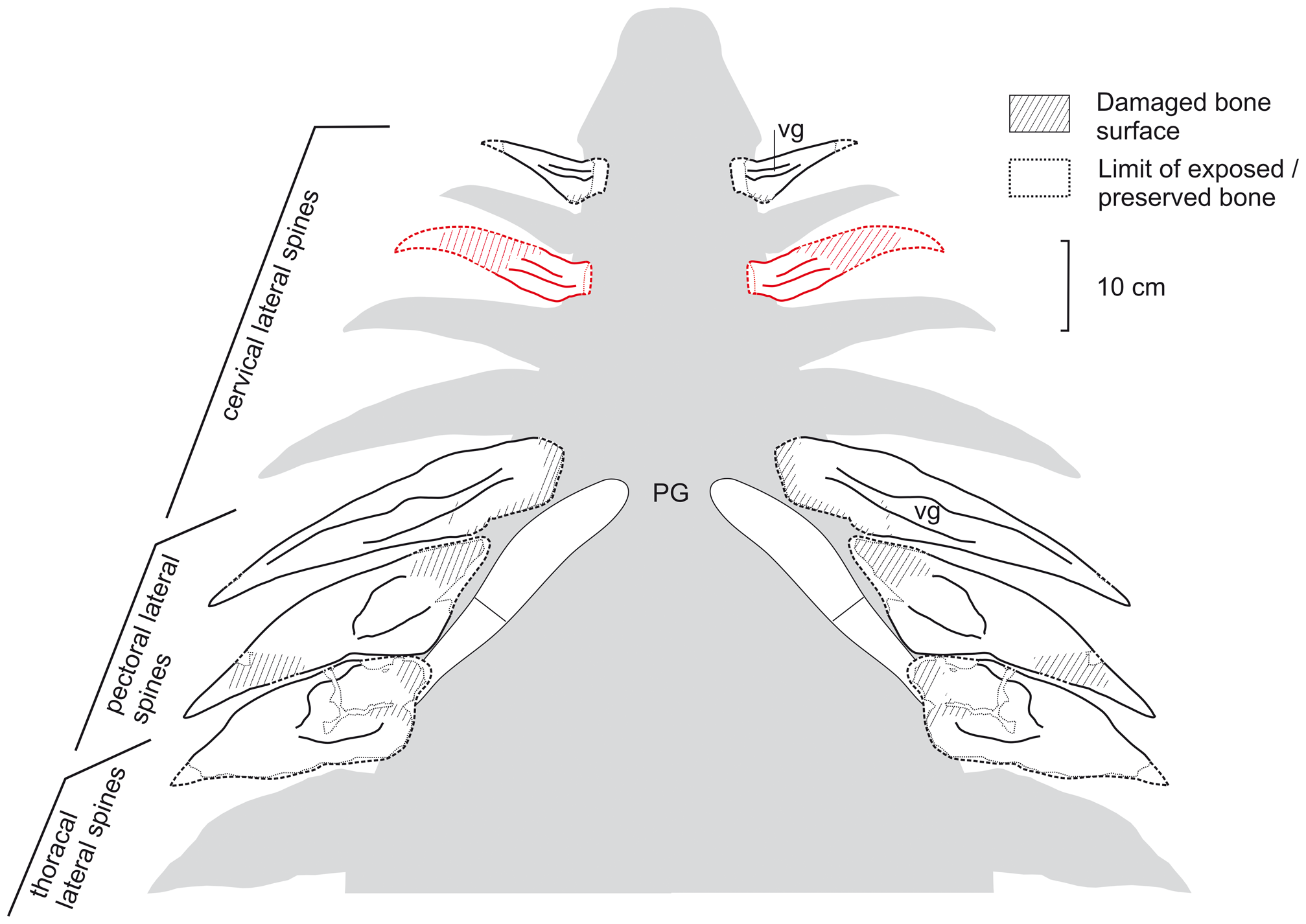
Diagram of possible osteoderm arrangement; exact positions are not certain

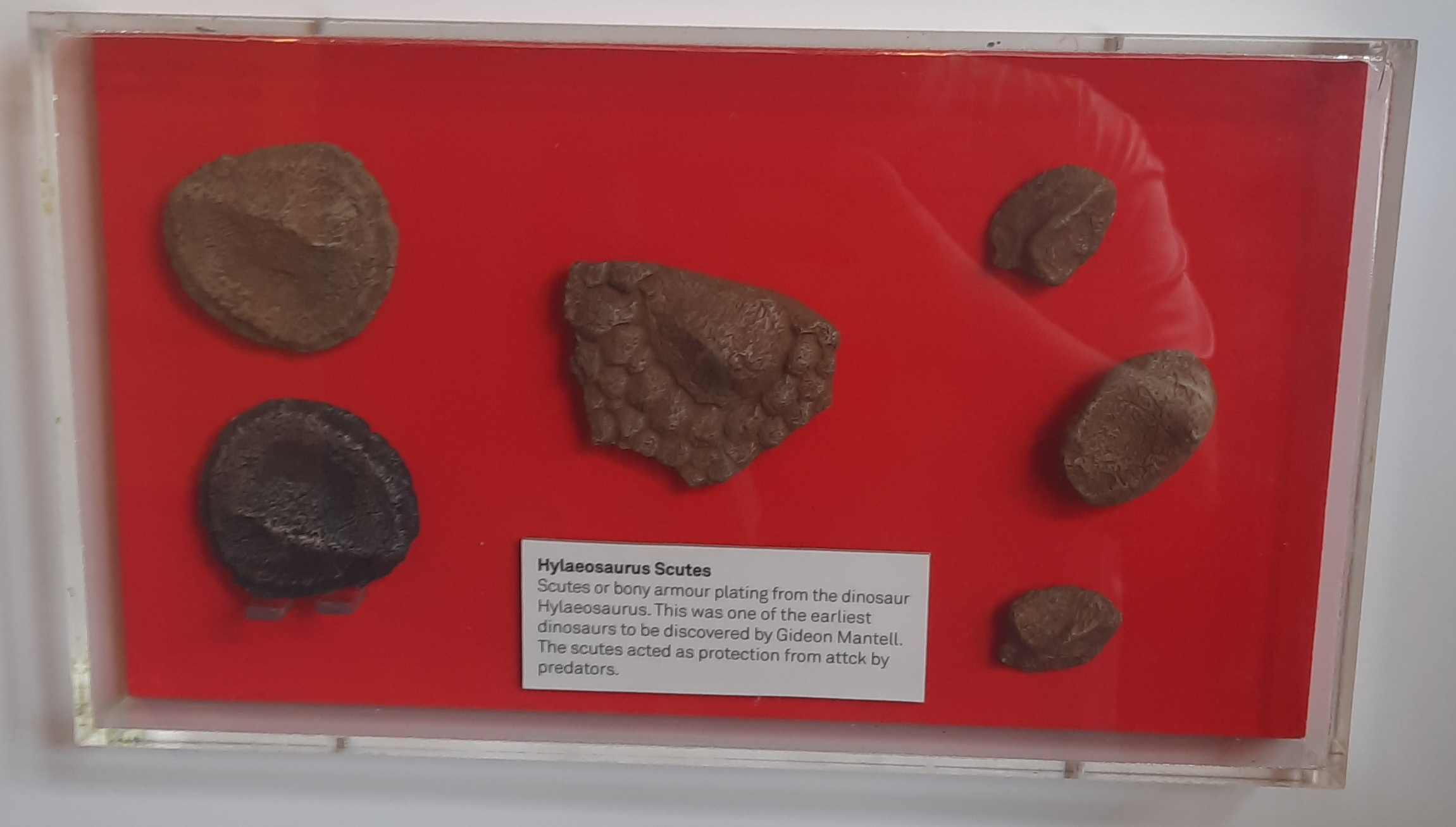
Hylaeosaurus scutes discovered in England

Several distinguishing traits were established in 2020. On the shoulder blade, there is a sharp angle of 120° between the acromion and the proximal plate. The acromial process is shelf-shaped instead of thumb-like or folded, from a point positioned at a third from the top edge projecting obliquely to below and sideways instead of strictly laterally. The top edge of the proximal plate is curved sideways. The sides of the centra of the neck vertebrae show a horizontal ridge. Apart from these autapomorphies, the undersides of the side processes of the back vertebrae are exceptionally concave.

The spines at the shoulder are curved to the rear, long, flattened, narrow and pointed. Their underside shows a shallow trough. The front spine is the longest at 42.5 centimetres; to the rear the spines become gradually shorter and wider. A fourth spine, of about the same build but more forward-pointing, is present immediately behind the skull. In 2013 Sven Sachs and Jahn Hornung suggested a configuration in which there were five lateral neck spines, the new German spine having a morphology adapted to fit in the third position.

== Phylogeny ==
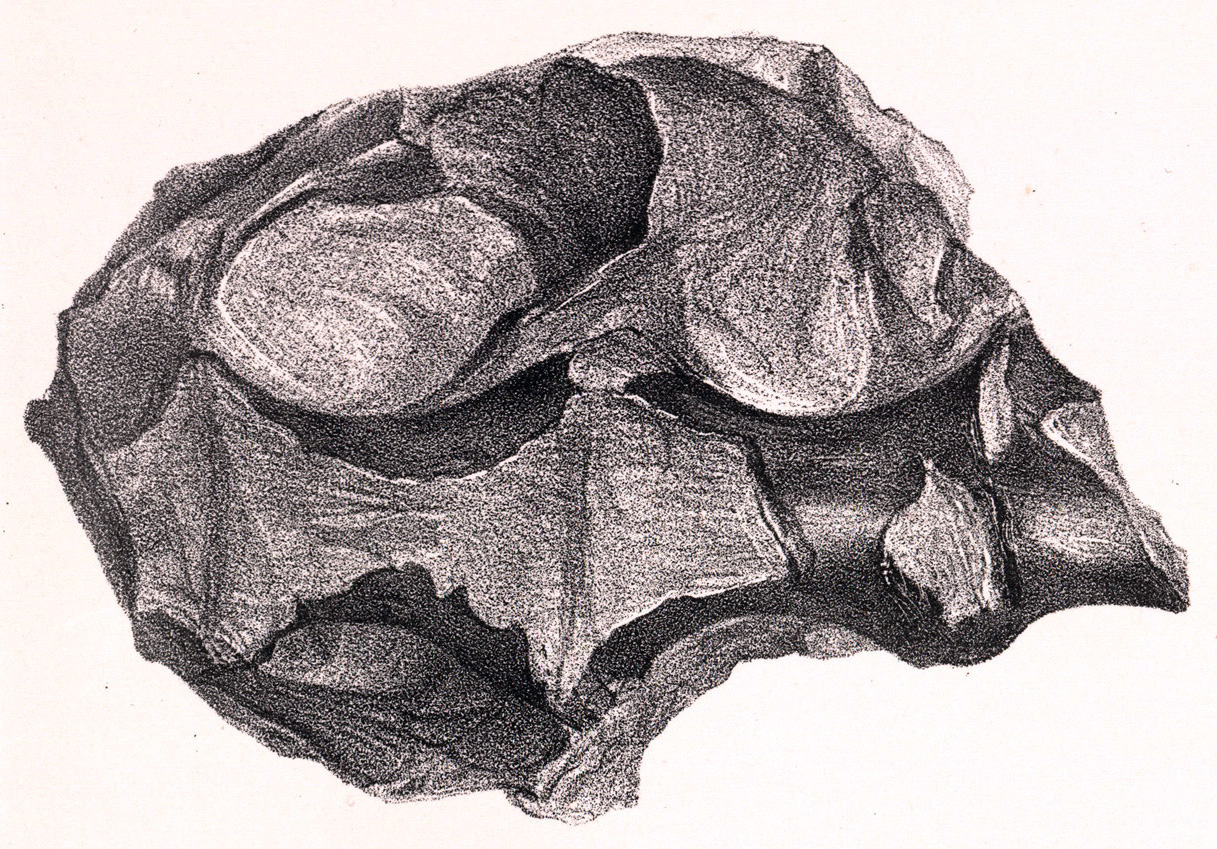
Referred sacral vertebrae

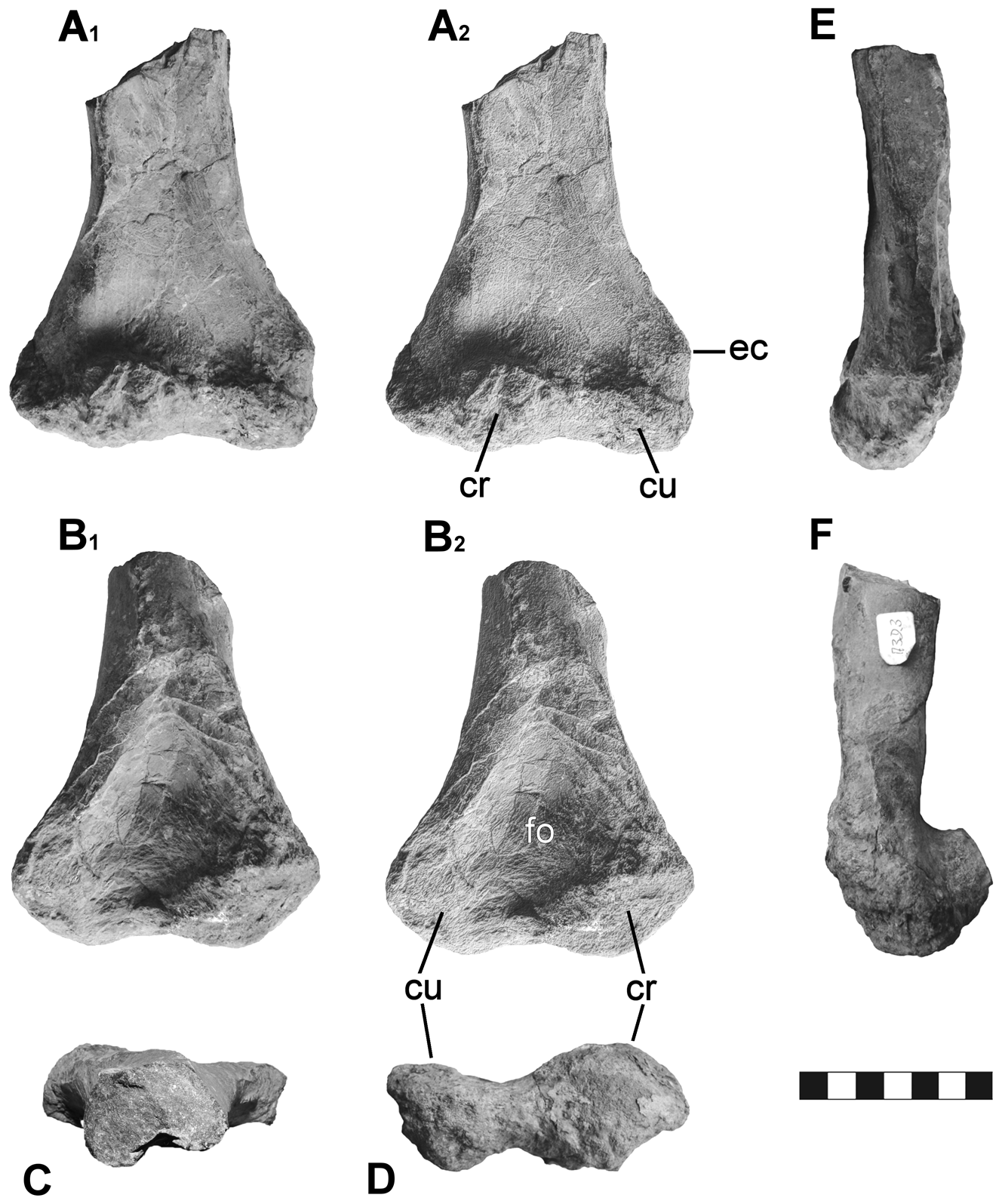
Partial referred humerus from Germany

Hylaeosaurus was the first ankylosaur discovered. Until well into the twentieth century its exact affinities would remain uncertain. In 1978 Coombs assigned it to the Nodosauridae within the Ankylosauria. This is still a usual classification, Hylaeosaurus being recovered as a basal nodosaurid in most exact cladistic analyses, sometimes more precisely as a member of the Polacanthinae, and thus being related to Gastonia and Polacanthus. However, in the 1990s, the polacanthines were sometimes seen as basal ankylosaurids, because they were mistakenly believed to have small tail-clubs. A more popular alternative today is that they formed a Polacanthidae, a basal group outside of the nodosaurids + ankylosaurids clade.

A 2012 study finding Hylaeosaurus to be a basal nodosaurid but not a polacanthine is shown in this cladogram:

- Nodosauridae
  - Antarctopelta
  - - - Mymoorapelta
      - - Hylaeosaurus
        - Anoplosaurus
    - - Tatankacephalus
      - Horshamosaurus
      - Polacanthinae
        - Gargoyleosaurus
        - Hoplitosaurus
        - - Gastonia
          - - Peloroplites
            - Polacanthus
      - - - Struthiosaurus
          - Zhejiangosaurus
        - - Hungarosaurus
          - - Animantarx
            - - Niobrarasaurus
              - Nodosaurus
              - Pawpawsaurus
              - Sauropelta
              - Silvisaurus
              - Stegopelta
              - Texasetes
              - - Edmontonia
                - Panoplosaurus

It was defined as a non-ankylosaurine ankylosaurid in a phylogenetic analysis by Zheng et al. (2018). Below is a simplified cladogram from that study:

- Ankylosauridae
  - Kunbarrasaurus
  - - Hylaeosaurus
    - - Liaoningosaurus
      - Chuanqilong
      - Cedarpelta
      - - Shamosaurus
        - Gobisaurus
        - Ankylosaurinae
          - Jinyunpelta
          - - Crichtonpelta
            - - Pinacosaurus spp.
              - - - Saichania
                  - - Zaraapelta
                    - Tarchia
                - Ankylosaurini
                  - Tsagantegia
                  - - Talarurus
                    - Nodocephalosaurus
                  - - - Ziapelta
                      - Euoplocephalus
                    - - Ankylosaurus
                      - - Anodontosaurus
                        - - Scolosaurus
                          - - Zuul
                            - Dyoplosaurus

In one of two phylogenetic analyses by Xing et al. (2024) Hylaeosaurus is resolved as a non-euankylosaur ankylosaur. Below is a simplified cladogram from that study. Zheng et al. (2018) dataset + Datai (14-taxon deletion):

- Ankylosauria
  - Mymoorapelta
  - - Kunbarrasaurus
    - - Hylaeosaurus
      - - Gargoyleosaurus
        - - Nodosauridae
          - Ankylosauridae

== See also ==
- Timeline of ankylosaur research
