= Polacanthoides =

Polacanthoides Temporal range: Early Cretaceous, ~140–135 Ma

Scientific classification
- Kingdom: Animalia
- Phylum: Chordata
- Class: Reptilia
- Clade: Dinosauria
- Clade: †Ornithischia
- Clade: †Thyreophora
- Clade: †Ankylosauria
- Family: †Nodosauridae
- Subfamily: †Polacanthinae
- Genus: †Polacanthoides; Nopcsa, 1928

Type species
- †Polacanthoides ponderosus Nopcsa, 1928

Invalid genus of dinosaur

Polacanthoides (meaning like Polacanthus) is a dubious genus of nodosaurid dinosaur from the Wessex Formation of England. The type species is P. ponderosus.

== Discovery and naming ==
The holotype is NHMUK 2584 and it is a left scapula and left tibia discovered at the quarry near Bolney, West Sussex sometime between the 1820s and 1833; the whereabouts of the holotype scapula could not be located by Blows (1987). NHMUK 2584 was initially assigned to Hylaeosaurus by Mantell (1833), and the new species Polacanthoides ponderosus was created for it by Nopsca (1928).

Two more specimens were referred to P. ponderosus by Blows (1987): BMNH 2620a, a fragmentary right scapula, and BMNH 2615, a left tibia and scapula. Mantell (1833) initially believed BMNH 2615 was a humerus, while Lydekker (1888) assumed it was a left tibia.

== Classification ==
Polacanthoides is a member of the Polacanthinae and it has been suggested it was a chimera of skeletal elements belonging to Hylaeosaurus and Polacanthus. It has also been suggested that Polacanthoides belonged to Stegosauria.

== See also ==
- Timeline of ankylosaur research
