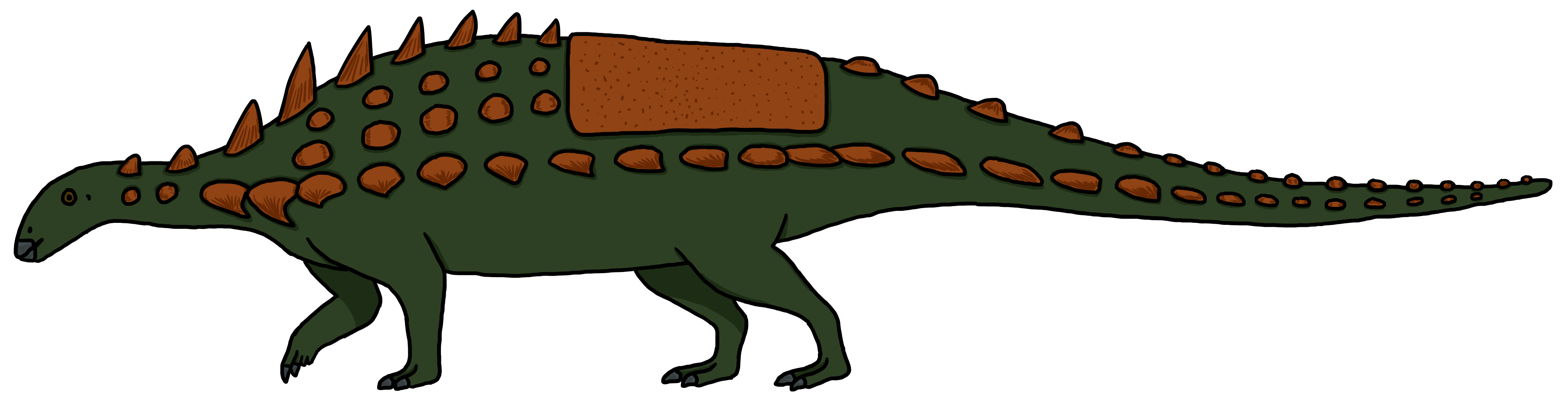
- Speculative life reconstruction

Scientific classification
- Kingdom: Animalia
- Phylum: Chordata
- Class: Reptilia
- Clade: Dinosauria
- Clade: †Ornithischia
- Clade: †Thyreophora
- Clade: †Ankylosauria
- Family: †Nodosauridae
- Genus: †Horshamosaurus; Blows, 2015
- Species: †H. rudgwickensis

Binomial name
- †Horshamosaurus rudgwickensis (Blows, 1996)

Synonyms
- Polacanthus rudgwickensis Blows, 1996

= Horshamosaurus =

Horshamosaurus Temporal range: Early Cretaceous, Barremian

Extinct genus of dinosaurs

Horshamosaurus is a genus of herbivorous ankylosaurian dinosaur from the Barremian stage of the Early Cretaceous of what is now England. The type species is Horshamosaurus rudgwickensis.

== Discovery ==
In 1985, at the marl quarry of the Rudgwick Brickworks Company near Rudgwick in West Sussex, fossils were dug up of dinosaurs by John Underhill. These were secured by two volunteers of the Horsham Museum: Morris Zdzalek and Sylvia Standing. After 1988, the finds were exhibited in the museum as Iguanodon bones. Subsequently, neurologist William T. Blows, an amateur paleontologist who already had extensively published on the subject of armoured dinosaurs, determined that the bones were not iguanodontian but instead represented ankylosaurian remains.

In 1996, on basis of the finds, a new species of the genus Polacanthus, Polacanthus rudgwickensis, was named and described by Blows. The specific name refers to the provenance from Rudgwick.

The material, holotype HORSM 1988.1546, was found in a layer of grey-green marl beds of the lower Weald Clay dating from the Barremian age, over 125 million years old. It is fragmentary and includes two incomplete dorsal vertebrae, part of a front tail vertebra, bone fragments of other vertebrae, a partial left scapulocoracoid of the shoulder girdle, the distal end of a humerus, a nearly complete right tibia, rib fragments, and two osteoderms.

In 2015, Blows made it a separate genus Horshamosaurus, the generic name referring to Horsham. Its type species is Polacanthus rudgwickensis. The combinatio nova is Horshamosaurus rudgwickensis.

In 2020, Horshamosaurus was determined to be dubious, and not diagnosable beyond Nodosauridae. The presumed tibia was also re-interpreted as being an ischium.

== Description ==
Horshamosaurus seems, at roughly five metres length, to have been about 30% longer than the type species of Polacanthus, Polacanthus foxii and differs from it in numerous characters of the vertebrae and dermal armour. Apart from the greater length, in 1996 several traits were established, distinguishing Horshamosaurus from Polacanthus. The centrum facets of the back and tail vertebrae have a round instead of a heart-shaped profile. The transverse processes of the vertebrae each have two ridges at their undersides delimiting a depression and gradually merging with the vertebral body. The transverse processes of the front tail vertebrae have a distinctive top ridge, running from the front to the rear, merging with the neural arch at the base of the process, while sloping downwards at its inner side. The "pseudoacromion" is located close to the front edge of the shoulder blade. The rear ribs are large and tall instead of rather slender. The shinbone is relatively longer. The osteoderm spikes on the back have a circular base of which the front underside is excavated but the rear underside solid, instead of an oval base with a uniformly concave underside. One of the osteoderms seems to have been part of the back armour and is large and flat with a concave underside; plates of such a type have not been discovered with Polacanthus foxii.

In 2015, three traits were added. The shoulder blade is robust and large, fused with the coracoid. The vertebral centra of the front tail vertebrae are shorter and especially taller. With the tail vertebrae, the base of the side process covers the top half of the centrum, seen from the front or from behind, instead of a quarter of the height.

== Phylogeny ==
Horshamosaurus was in cladistic analyses not recovered as a sister species of Polacanthus. In 2015, Blows did not place Horshamosaurus in a Polacanthidae but in a more derived position in the Ankylosauria. He suggested it was a member of the Nodosauridae.
