= Chimera (paleontology) =

Fossil reconstructed from elements of more than one species

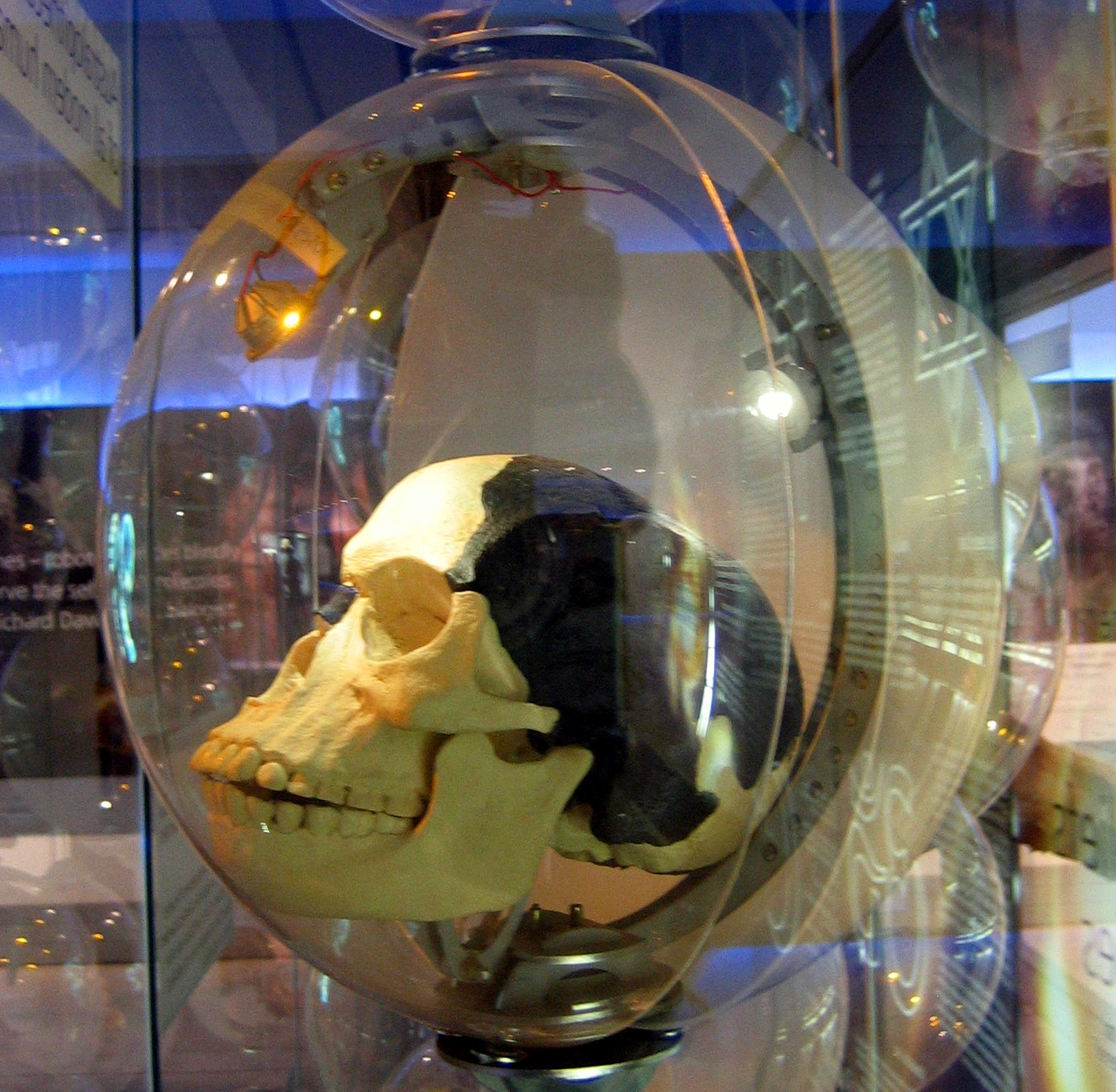
The Sterkfontein Piltdown Man, a famous paleontological hoax concerning the finding of the remains of a previously unknown early human.

In paleontology, a chimera is a fossil that was reconstructed with elements coming from more than a single species or genus of animal. In other words, they are mistakes or sometimes hoaxes made by paleontologists, putting together parts that do not come from the same organism.

== List of paleontological chimeras ==
- "Archaeoraptor"
- Avalonianus
- Bagaraatan
- Beipiaognathus?
- Dalianraptor?
- Dravidosaurus
- Eocarcharia?
- Kryptops?
- Kootenichela?
- Lametasaurus?
- Luchibang
- Ornithopsis hulkei
- Piltdown Man
- Polacanthoides?
- Precursor?
- Protathlitis?
- Protoavis
- Saurophaganax?
- "Teihivenator"
- "Tylosaurus" capensis
- Ultrasauros
- Variraptor
